= Savignano =

Savignano may refer to:

== People ==
- Ernest Savignano (1919–1994), American footballer
- Luciana Savignano (born 1943), Italian ballet dancer

== Places ==
- Savignano Irpino, a municipality in the Province of Avellino, Campania
- Savignano sul Panaro, a municipality in the Province of Modena, Emilia-Romagna
- Savignano sul Rubicone, a municipality in the Province of Forlì-Cesena, Emilia-Romagna
- Savignano (Pontelatone), a hamlet of Pontelatone in the Province of Caserta, Campania
- Savignano (Pomarolo), a hamlet of Pomarolo (TN), Trentino-South Tyrol
- Savignano (Vaiano), a hamlet of Vaiano (PO), Tuscany
