= Alice Rumph =

American painter

Alice Edith Rumph (1878–1978) was a painter of watercolors and pastels, an etcher, and an art teacher. Rumph co-founded the Birmingham Art Club, which established the Birmingham Museum of Art in Birmingham, Alabama. She served as the club's founding vice president and later as its president. In 2004, Birmingham Historical Society published Art of the New South: Women Artists of Birmingham 1890-1950. The volume features the artwork of Rumph and seven other prominent artists from the city.

== Early life and education ==
Rumph, a descendant of John Washington, was born to Mary Hume and Cornelius Mandeville Rumph in Rome, Georgia on May 9, 1877. After graduating from high school, she served as the secretary/treasurer of the Birmingham Art League. When the group ceased operating, Rumph studied art under William Parrish. In 1900, she received a three-year artist scholarship from the Continental Gin Company, a manufacturer of cotton gins that employed her father. Rumph then moved to London, England to begin her studies in Europe. After touring London and Berlin, Germany, she settled in Paris, France with a residency at the American Club of Paris. In the fall of 1900, Rumph began taking courses at the Académie Colarossi.

During her studies at the academy, her piece Dutch Interior earned an exhibition at the salon of the Grand Palais. Rumph later exhibited Dutch Interior at the American Watercolor Society in New York City and the Art Institute of Chicago in Chicago, Illinois. While finishing up her overseas studies, she toured Italy and Switzerland.

== Teaching and etching ==
In 1904, Rumph began teaching art at the Margaret Allen School in Birmingham. After working at the school for seven years, she moved to New York City to continue her education at the New York School of Fine and Applied Arts (now Parsons The New School for Design). Rumoh received her teaching certificate in art and then moved back to Birmingham to open an art studio. During the next three years, she taught private lessons at her studio while running a nearby gift shop. After moving to Roanoke, Virginia in 1916, Rumph taught college art courses at Hollins College (now Hollins University). She then taught at private schools in Asheville, North Carolina, New York City, and Baltimore, Maryland. She taught at the Beard School (now the Morristown-Beard School) in Orange, New Jersey from 1922 to 1942.

While teaching, Rumph developed a mastery of etching. In 1939, she exhibited her etchings at the New York World's Fair in Flushing Meadows-Corona Park in the New York City Borough of Queens. Rumph later crafted etchings of landmarks of Colonial Williamsburg. She sold these works at the gift shop of the Colonial Williamsburg Foundation.

Rumph also continued to paint watercolors. She received awards from the Pennsylvania Academy of Fine Arts and the American Watercolor Society in 1931. In 1932, Rumph received an award for her etchings from the Society of American Etchers (now the Society of American Graphic Artists). In 1938, she won the Lila May Chapman Purchase Prize for Our Stairway at the Southern States Art League's exhibition at the Witte Museum in San Antonio, Texas.

== Collections ==
The Smithsonian American Art Museum in Washington, D.C. features two of Rumph's etchings: The Doctor's Office and Spring in the City. The Chicago Society of Etchers donated both works from 1935.
