= Aubrey Barr =

American marathon runner

- Born: Aubrey Adam Barr
- Occupations: marathon runner, public speaker

Aubrey Adam Barr is a marathon runner and a childhood cancer survivor. Barr is the namesake of the Aubrey Fund for Pediatric Cancer Research at Memorial Sloan-Kettering Cancer Center in Manhattan. As of 2014, Barr has run in 30 marathons, including the New York City Marathon and the Boston Marathon in Boston, Massachusetts.

== Early life ==
Barr received a diagnosis of acute lymphoblastic leukemia, a cancer affecting the white blood cells, at age four. During the next several years, she received experimental chemotherapy treatment at Memorial Sloan-Kettering. At age 17, Barr's cancer went into full remission. In 1985, she graduated from Morristown-Beard School in Morristown, New Jersey. Morristown-Beard School awarded Barr their Distinguished Alumni Award in 2005.

== Marathon running ==
In 1992, Barr ran in the Boston Marathon for the first time. Following the race, she gained a greater interest in the sport of marathon running, which led her to register to run in the New York City Marathon in the fall. Soon after registering, Barr received a letter from runner Fred Lebow that encouraged her to collect donations to support cancer research at Memorial Sloan-Kettering Cancer Center. Lebow, who co-founded the New York City Marathon and served as president of New York Road Runners, was receiving cancer treatment at the medical center at that time. After raising $1,500 for Memorial Sloan-Kettering in the New York City Marathon, Barr continued to collect donations for them in future races.

In 1997, Memorial Sloan-Kettering named their Aubrey Fund for Pediatric Cancer Research after Barr. As of 2008, the Aubrey Fund had raised more than $25 million to support childhood cancer research at Memorial Sloan-Kettering. Barr resides in Duxbury, Massachusetts, a suburb of Boston, and she practices for races by running alongside the Charles River. She runs her races with Fred's Team, the marathon fundraising group for Memorial Sloan-Kettering named after Lebow. During the 2012 New York City Marathon, Barr and her teammates paid tribute to Lebow at the statute honoring him in Central Park in New York City.

== Public speaking on cancer ==
In 2012, Barr gave the keynote address at an event held by CentraState Medical Center in Freehold Township, New Jersey to celebrate National Cancer Survivors Day. CentraState participates in clinical trials of cancer research for the Cancer Trials Support Unit at the National Cancer Institute. She gave the keynote address at the gala of the Next Generation Foundation in 2010. The foundation aims to increase the involvement of youth and young adults in efforts to address cancer.
