= Morristown Beard School =

Prep school in Morristown, New Jersey, US

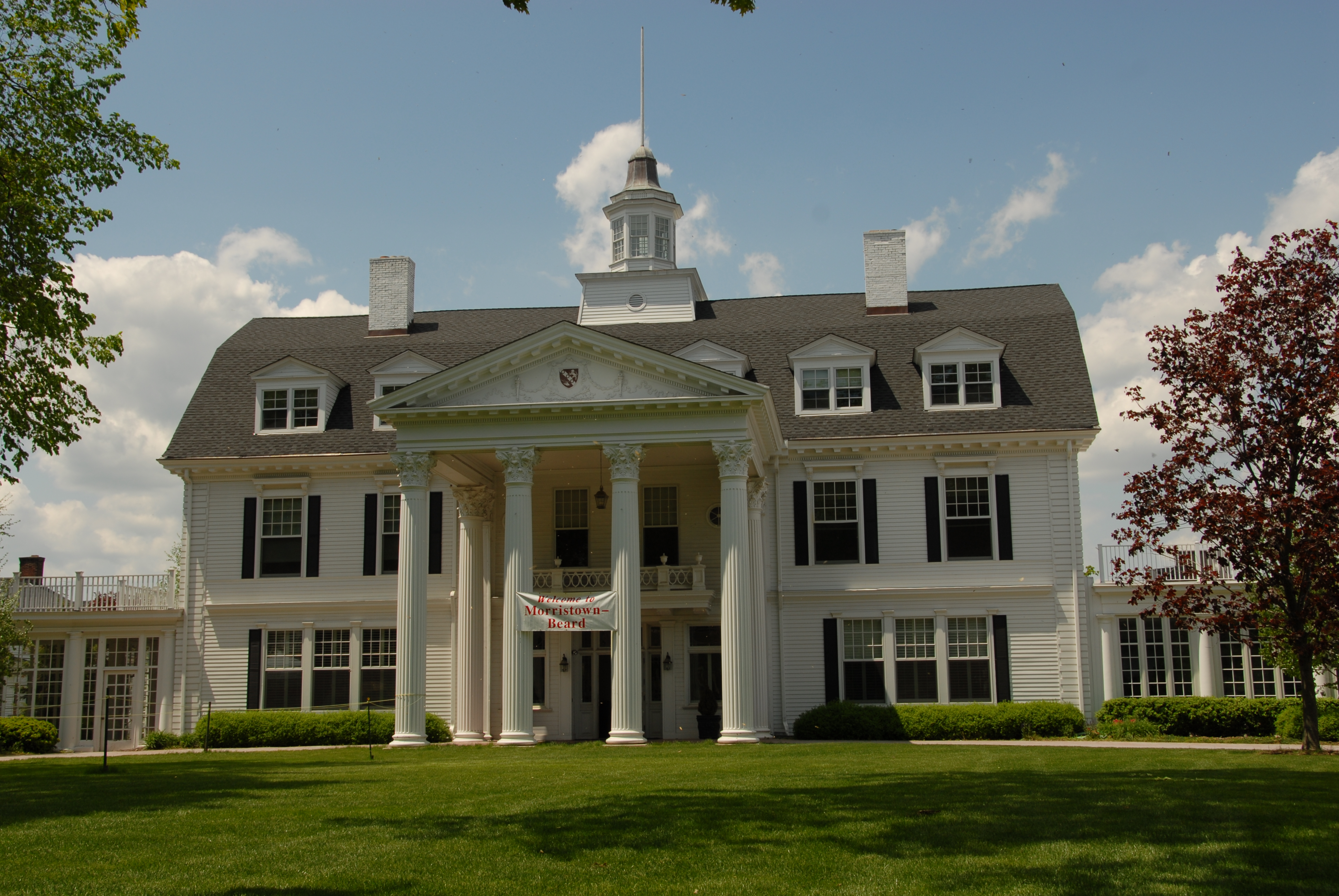

Location
- 70 Whippany Road; Morristown, (Morris County), New Jersey 07960; United States

Information
- Type: Private Independent day school
- Motto: Ad Astra per Aspera ("Through adversity to the stars")
- Established: 1891
- NCES School ID: 00869014
- Faculty: 162
- Grades: 6–12
- Gender: Coeducational
- Enrollment: 616 (as of 2021–22)
- Average class size: 12–14
- Student to teacher ratio: 6.6:1
- Campus size: 22 acres (0.089 km^{2})
- Colors: Crimson; White; Black
- Athletics conference: Northwest Jersey Athletic Conference
- Team name: Crimson
- Accreditation: Middle States Association of Colleges and Schools; New Jersey Association of Independent Schools
- Newspaper: Crimson Sun
- Yearbook: Salmagundi
- Tuition: $50,200 (2023–24 Upper School)
- Head of School: Ryan Liese
- Head of Upper School: Katie Pepper (interim)
- Head of Middle School: Alonda Casselle
- Website: www.mbs.net
- Morristown School
- U.S. National Register of Historic Places
- Location within Morris County, New Jersey Location within New Jersey Location within the United States
- Location: Jct. of Whippany Road and Hanover Avenue, Morris Township, Morristown, New Jersey
- Coordinates: 40°48′13″N 74°26′58″W
- Area: less than one acre
- Built: 1896
- Architects: Boring Brothers, et al.; Collins, John D.
- Architectural style: Colonial Revival, Classical Revival
- NRHP reference No.: 96000047
- Added to NRHP: February 28, 1996

Morristown Beard School is a coeducational, independent, college-preparatory day school located in Morristown, New Jersey, United States. Serving students in sixth through twelfth grades, the school has two academic units: an Upper School (9–12) and a Middle School (6–8).

The present-day Morristown Beard School was formed from the 1971 merger of two single-sex schools: the Beard School for Girls and the Morristown School for Boys. The Commission on Secondary Schools at the Middle States Association of Colleges and Schools has accredited the school since 1973.

Peter J. Caldwell served as Morristown Beard School's Head of School from 2011 to 2021. The interim head of school is Philicia Levinson, who took office in June 2025 to succeed Liz Morrison, who had assumed the role of head of school on July 1, 2021.

== Student body and faculty ==
As of the 2021–22 school year, the school had an enrollment of 616 students and 94.0 classroom teachers (on an FTE basis), for a student–teacher ratio of 6.6:1. The school's student body was 73.1% (450) White, 8.6% (53) Black, 6.3% (39) Hispanic, 6.0% (37) two or more races, 5.7% (35) Asian and 0.3% (2) American Indian / Alaska Native. Of the 2018–19 school year, Morristown Beard School had 435 Upper School students and 140 Middle School students. The student body (46% male, 54% female) come from 90+ towns in New Jersey.

Ninety-two faculty members teach at Morristown Beard School as of the 2018–19 school year. The school has a faculty–to-student ratio of 1:7 and an average class size of 13 students. Seventy-two percent of the faculty hold advanced degrees, and 19% hold PhDs.

== History ==
=== St. Bartholomew's School ===
The Episcopal Church founded Morristown School as St. Bartholomew's School in 1891. Rev. Frank E. Edwards, a graduate of Harvard University (1891), served as the school's first headmaster, and classes took place in Morristown's Normandy Park area. St. Bartholomew's school was noted for hosting a speech by Sir Arthur Conan Doyle, author of the Sherlock Holmes novels, in 1894.

Three years later, St. Bartholomew's School moved its classes to Whippany Road after building a new campus near the Morristown railroad station. Designed by architects Edward Lippincott Tilton and William A. Boring (co-designers of Ellis Island's Immigrant Station), the buildings for this campus required only 90 days to construct. The blended Colonial Revival and Classical Revival architecture styles reflect the colonial history of the Morristown area. Ford Mansion in Morristown (now part of Morristown National Historical Park) served as one of George Washington's headquarters during the American Revolutionary War.

=== Morristown School ===
When St. Bartholomew's School faced financial challenges in late 1897, three of its teachers from Harvard University Class of 1888 reorganized St. Bartholomew's School as the Morristown School. These three co-founders of Morristown School were Francis Call Woodman, Arthur Pierce Butler, and Thomas Quincy Browne. Aiding their work to start the new school, a large donation from wealthy businessman Henry Lee Higginson (known for founding the Boston Symphony Orchestra) provided critical seed funding. The school also benefited from large financial gifts of three other notable philanthropists: businessmen Charles Francis Adams III, Larz Anderson III, and Joseph Lee. Adams (a great-grandson of President John Quincy Adams) and Anderson (a son of General Nicholas Longworth Anderson) graduated from Harvard in the same class year as Morristown School's co-founders. (Lee graduated from Harvard five years earlier.)

Morristown School prepared its students for Harvard University, other Ivy League schools, and engineering schools. The school opened in September 1898 with 23 students and eight staff members. Just two years later, enrollment more than tripled to educate 75 students; the student body increased to 173 by 1923. In 1908, Morristown School achieved recognition as one of only two schools outside New England to send students to Harvard for ten consecutive years (1899–1908). Strengthening the connection with Harvard, Morristown School leaders hosted the Harvard Club of New Jersey. The club's April 1909 meeting brought visits from Harvard President Charles Eliot, New Jersey Governor John Fort, and New Jersey Chancellor Mahlon Pitney (later a U.S Supreme Court justice). Eleven years later, the Morristown School ran a $500,000 fundraising campaign to establish an endowment. Several Harvard graduates served on the campaign's executive committee, including graduates of Harvard and the Morristown School (writer Roger Burlingame, journalist Samuel T. Williamson, and businessman Felix Knauth).

During World War I, 65 of Morristown School's first 103 graduates (63%) served in the U.S. military. Their service reflected the value of community service emphasized by Morristown School to its student body. During the war, students at the school raised funds to purchase and equip the Morristown School Ambulance. They then presented this ambulance to the American Field Service for use in France. The American Field Service awarded Morristown School a certificate and a brass plaque to show its appreciation for the ambulance. In 1913, a group of 40 of Morristown School's students helped the Morristown Fire Department extinguish a forest fire that had spread over three miles on Horse Hill; the students used portable chemical extinguishers to fight the flames. Nine years later, the full student body (173 students) helped fight a large fire that had destroyed two nearby houses. In 1957, the basketball team donated a trophy to Delbarton School (the school rival) to honor Paul Kreutz, a Delbarton player who drowned in 1956.

=== Beard School ===
In 1891, sisters Lucie Beard, Eliza Mills Beard, and Ettie Beard Foster started a school for kindergarten students on Claredon Place in Orange, New Jersey. The three sisters were cousins of historian James Truslow Adams, a Pulitzer Prize winning writer. Eliza Beard oversaw the school's financial management, and Lucie Beard ran the educational activities. Their mother, Hester Truslow Beard, also assisted with the establishment of the school. The Beard school had an initial enrollment of 13 students. The all-girls school moved to Berkley Avenue in 1900 and continued adding grades until it graduated its first class in 1903. Taking the role of a preparatory country day school, Beard School prepared its students for the Seven Sisters and other colleges and universities.

Earning notoriety for this purpose, the Beard School received financial support from capitalist Sidney Morse Colgate of Colgate-Palmolive. In 1928, the school hosted a speech by Rev. Harry Emerson Fosdick, a social justice activist, at its commencement ceremony. Fosdick's visit reflected Beard School's commitment to service for its student body. During World War I, the students made bandages and wound dressings and began a tradition of sewing and knitting items to donate to the American Red Cross. This tradition extended into and past the Great Depression of the 1930s. During World War II, Beard School's students worked for the Junior Red Cross and assisted the American war effort by contributing their time and money.

On November 30, 1953, a large fire swept through Beard School's campus in the middle of the night. Reaching a peak of fifty feet in the air, the fire engulfed two of the school's five buildings and left them unusable. The fire destroyed an auditorium, 16 classrooms, and Beard School's gymnasium. After calling the fire department, Headmistress Edith Sutherland awakened the 20 boarding students and led them to safety on the school's front lawn.

Salvaging wood from the school's ruined buildings, a machinist repairman who lived nearby built a two-story garage for his family's home. His daughter later penned an essay about her childhood that described her memories surrounding the fire. Submitting the essay to Unico National, an Italian-American service organization, she earned second place in their Ella T. Grasso literary contest. Rebuilding, Beard School launched the Beard Fund campaign in Fall 1954 to fund construction of a new building to replace the two buildings devastated by the fire. The campaign hosted a Hawaiian-themed benefit dance on October 22, 1954, to raise some of the funds. In the spring of that school year, the Beard School opened the new fireproof building for use by classes. Eleven years later, the Beard School had discussions with Short Hills Country Day School about a potential merger of the two schools. The two schools did not merge, however. Short Hills Country Day School later merged with the Pingry School in Bernards, New Jersey.

=== Morristown Beard School ===
The all-boys Morristown School merged with the all-girls Beard School in 1971. The new co-ed school elected to use Morristown School's campus in Morristown and close the Beard School's campus in Orange. (The former campus of the Beard School now houses the White House Healthcare & Rehabilitation Center.) On Prize Day, June 5, 1971, the Morristown School officially transitioned into Morristown Beard School, a name chosen to reflect the importance of the history of its predecessor schools.

Recognizing their collective legacy, Morristown Beard School adopted the Beard School's Latin motto of ("Ad Astra per Aspera") and the Morristown School's school shield. (The Morristown School had two Latin mottos: "Civitas" and "Orbis Aratro Pendet". The former means citizenship, and the latter means: "The world hangs in the work of the plow.") Morristown Beard School also renamed its Main Building as Beard Hall. The first class of the school graduated in June 1972. Twenty-two years later in 1994, the school expanded its Middle School's student body from two grades (7–8) to three (6–8).

Morristown-Beard was the subject to a sex-scandal in 2011 due to a sexual relationship between a student and a teacher. The couple where engaged in a sexual relationship since at least 2010, a date an MBS employee went on record stating he saw the two engage in a physical relationship. The relationship was made apparent to the student's parents when she feigned an illness during a school trip to Greece in 2011 and was 'chaperoned' by the teacher until she recovered which went against school rules. The school initially requested the student's parents be lenient, but claimed to have no knowledge of the relationship at the time. By December 2011 MBS administration received numerous calls from concerned parents about the relationship, and performed an internal investigation, but never notified the Division of Child Protection and Permanency (DCPP) with other concerned parents having to go directly to the DCPP to get them involved. Shortly after the DCPP got involved the teacher fled to Israel and following her graduation after not physically attending classes Senior year the student also moved to Israel. Her parents sued the school in December 2015 for gross negligence, breach of contract, negligent infliction of emotional distress, and fraud. Shortly after the DCPP began their investigation in 2011 headmaster Alex Curtis stepped down, being replaced by Peter Caldwell. In 2016 the lawsuit was dismissed as the judge ruled the parents had no standing to sue, and that only she herself could sue, but the judge did acknowledge that she was sexually assaulted by the teacher.

Many notable figures have visited Morristown Beard School to speak to students, faculty, and staff. Colonel Jack H. Jacobs, a Medal of Honor recipient, spoke on the Friday before Memorial Day weekend in 2015. Jacobs received the medal for bravery during the Vietnam War. Other notable speakers have included: businesswoman Bobbi Brown, authors Rachel Simmons and Bryan Burrough, and Congressman Rodney Frelinghuysen.

During the George Floyd protests three seniors where recorded saying slurs and mocking George Floyd. Following this the three students had their admissions to various prestigious colleges revoked. Following the incident the Headmaster, Peter Caldwell, stepped down and Elizabeth Morrison was brought in to reshape school culture to be more diverse and inclusive and to empower the school's black students, however, this sudden change in management has been met with some push back with many of the teachers seeking employment elsewhere.

Morrison resigned suddenly in June 2025, with Philicia Levinson, the school's director of Human Resources, being named interim head in her absence.

== Facilities ==
Supported by a $16.2 million capital campaign, Morristown Beard School constructed the Middle School building and Founders Hall, a performing arts facility. The Middle School building opened during fall 2008, and Founders Hall, which houses a 630-seat surround-sound theatre, opened during winter 2009. In 2011, Morristown Beard School transformed Wilkie Hall, which had previously contained the performing arts center, into a technology center with multiple computer labs.

Renovated in 2004, Grant Hall now houses the Center for Academic Writing, the English Department, and the World Languages Department. That year, Morristown Beard also opened the renovated Beard Hall with space for Anderson Library and offices for the History Department, College Counseling, Admissions, and the Headmaster. In 2007, the school renovated South Wing, which now houses the MBS Center for Teaching and Learning (formerly the Center for Learning) and visual arts classrooms. Morristown Beard School's students have access to a film production studio with a green screen, a studio for multi-track digital audio recording, and a post-production studio.

From 2016 to 2017 a large renovation and construction project took place in the north-western corner of Morristown Beard's campus which saw the demolition of the old Math Building and the Science Annex to make away for the new "Math and Science building". The original math building was a Depression era residential building, while the Science annex where two double-wide trailers that where constructed as "temporary" classrooms and where in-use for 15 years. The new Math and Science building was connected via an annex to the dining hall, while the old science classrooms under the dining hall where renovated into a collaborative technological space. The renovations cost over $30 million that was the result of a 10 to 12 year fundraiser. The building was designed by NK Architects and completed in time to be opened for the 2017 school-year.

In 2021 the school dedicated its main quad to the Class of 2020 due to their graduation and senior year being impacted by the COVID-19 pandemic.

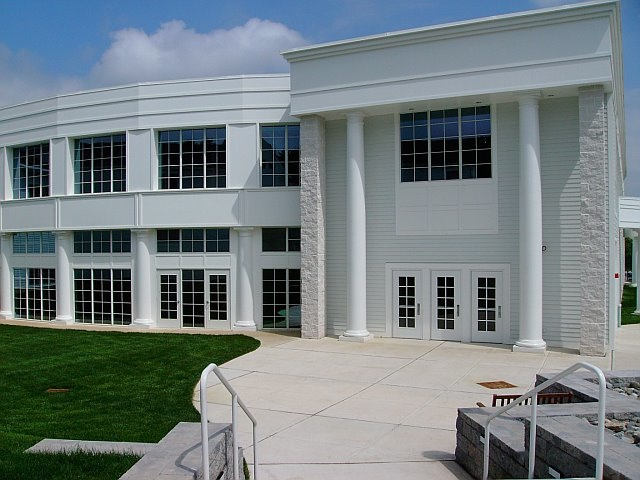
Founders Hall

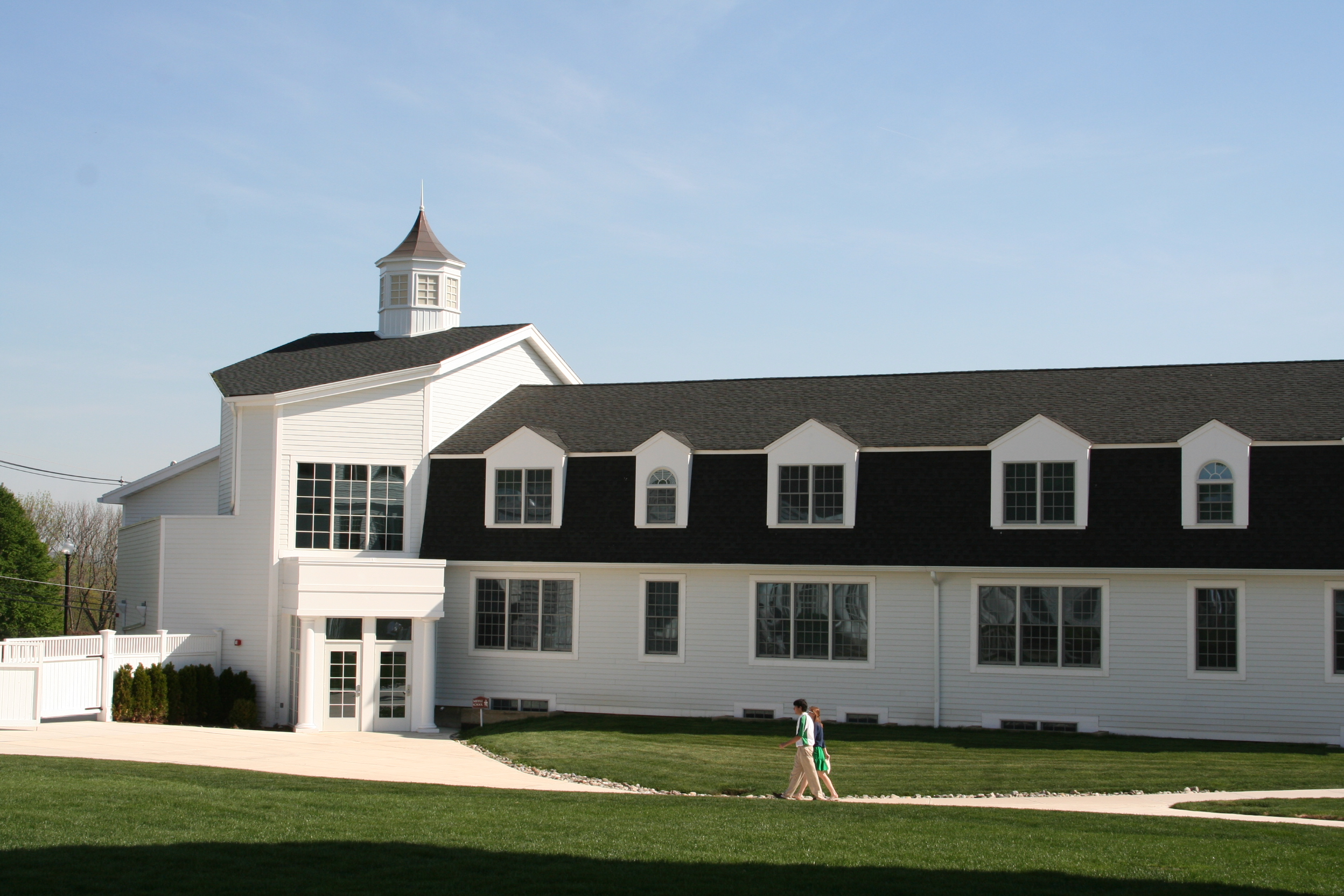
New Middle School

== School-wide iPad program ==
=== 2010–2011 iPad pilot ===
In the fall of 2010, Morristown Beard School became one of the first schools in the U.S. to integrate the iPad tablet made by Apple Inc. into its curriculum. For their pilot program, six teachers and 60 students used iPads inside and outside the classroom. During the pilot program, executives from Apple, Inc. visited Morristown Beard School to observe how their iPads enhanced instructional practices and stimulated students' learning.

=== Campus iPad integration ===
Beginning with the 2011–2012 academic year, Morristown Beard School now requires all students to purchase an iPad and use the tablet device to assist schoolwork. The school's curriculum includes multiple electives that teach software development for iOS, the operating system that drives iPads, iPhones, and Apple TVs. Morristown Beard School also runs a dedicated 1000 Mbit/s Wi-Fi network to enable students' and faculty iPads to access the Internet.

In 2013, Morristown Beard School equipped all classrooms on its campus and many of the school's public spaces with ceiling mounted LCD projectors and wireless media streaming through Apple TV. That year, students Graham Dyer and Lena Rajan created the MBS Now app for iPads to help members of the school community quickly access information about school happenings. The MBS Now app provides information on class schedules, homework assignments, school calendars, lunch menus, extracurricular activities, athletic competitions, and school news. The app also provides school forms for various activities and information on senior projects. Members of the Morristown Beard School community contribute content to MBS Now by posting updates at the app's home portal. Publication of the source code for each update to MBS Now on GitHub enables students at other K–12 schools to develop similar iOS apps.

Due to being one of the first school's in the country to implement a 1:1 iPad program, Morristown Beard was recognized as an Apple Distinguished School since 2024.

== Clubs and extracurricular activities ==
=== Community service ===
Upper School (grade 9–12) students must complete at least eight hours of community service during each semester and write reflections on their experiences. Fulfilling their service requirement, many Morristown Beard students organize campus blood drives or assist local programs like Adopt-A-Trail. Other students volunteer for area nonprofit organizations, such as The Seeing Eye, Neighborhood House, Habitat for Humanity, and the Matheny Medical and Educational Center.

=== Campus clubs ===
The Crimson Sun, the student newspaper, has won three gold medalist awards from the Columbia Scholastic Press Association. Salmagundi, the school's yearbook, has published annually since 1904. The debate team has competed against area schools since a 1923 competition among Morristown School, Pingry School and Montclair Academy. The Quiz Bowl team has become increasingly prominent in recent years, hosting the first ever Morristown Beard Fall Invitational tournament in 2019. Other clubs and extracurricular activities at MBS include: Art Club, Business Finance and Investment Club, Contemporary Music Workshop, Drama Club, Drone Club, Film Club, Foster Care Club, GLOW Club (Girls Leadership, Outreach and Worth), Mariah (art & literary magazine), Mu Alpha Theta, Model United Nations, Service Committee, Young Republicans Club, Progressive Caucus, and the Student Government Association.

=== Theatre and arts ===
In recent years, Morristown Beard School's theatre program has received multiple nominations from Paper Mill Playhouse's Rising Star Awards program. In 2012, student Carina Steficek won a Student Achievement Award for her role as a master electrician and board operator in Bat Boy: The Musical. The following year, Morristown Beard School captured two awards at Montclair State University's Theatre Night Awards Ceremony. The school received an award for Outstanding Achievement in Costume Design for its performance of William Shakespeare's play A Midsummer Night's Dream. Student Alexa Rojek also received an award for Outstanding Performance by an Actress in a Leading Role in a Classical Work for her role in the play.

In 2013, student Jack Lindberg earned two awards for his singing accomplishments. He won first place for high school men singing classical voice at the Doris Lenz Festival for High School Students. Lindberg also captured a special commendation at the New Jersey All-State High School Opera Festival.

== Athletics ==
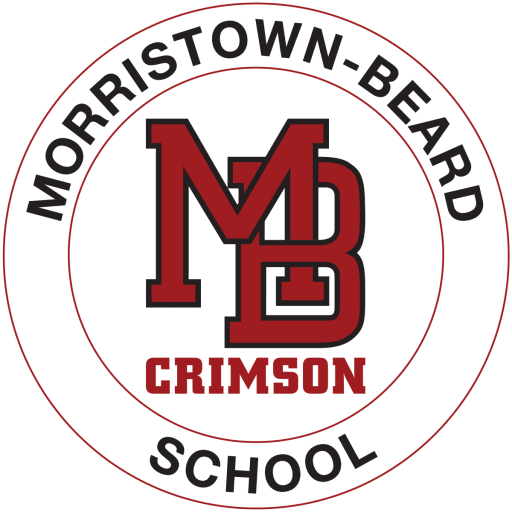
Logo of Morristown-Beard's athletics

The Morristown Beard School Crimson competes in the Northwest Jersey Athletic Conference, which is comprised of public and private high schools in Morris, Sussex and Warren counties, and operates under the supervision of the New Jersey State Interscholastic Athletic Association (NJSIAA). Prior to the NJSIAA's 2010 realignment, the school had participated in the Colonial Hills Conference which included public and private high schools in Essex, Morris and Somerset counties in west Central Jersey. With 335 students in grades 10–12, the school was classified by the NJSIAA for the 2019–20 school year as Non-Public B for most athletic competition purposes, which included schools with an enrollment of 37 to 366 students in that grade range (equivalent to Group I for public schools). The school was classified by the NJSIAA as Non-Public Group B (equivalent to Group I/II for public schools) for football for 2024–2026, which included schools with 140 to 686 students.

Cheered on by the bear (the school mascot), Morristown Beard School's teams compete as the Crimson, a reflection of historical ties with Harvard. The school's 20 varsity teams have captured championships in several sports. Five of Morristown Beard School's teams (football, girls' ice hockey, boys' cross country, girls' tennis, girls' volleyball) have attained undefeated seasons in their athletic histories. During the 1990s, the athletic facilities at Morristown Beard School played host to floor hockey competition of the New Jersey Special Olympics Winter Games.

In 2012, Lou Lamoriello, general manager of three Stanley Cup-winning New Jersey Devils teams, presented the keynote address at the induction ceremony for the school's Athletic Hall of Fame. The following year, Tony Siragusa, a former NFL player who played on a Super Bowl-winning Baltimore Ravens football team, spoke at Morristown Beard School. Siragusa, father of Morristown Beard School student Samantha Siragusa '15, worked as a sideline reporter for NFL games on Fox Sports from 2003 to 2016. In 2019 Trevor Baptiste was inducted into the school's athletic hall of fame.

=== Ice hockey ===
==== Boys' ice hockey team ====
As one of the oldest hockey programs in the U.S., the boys' ice hockey team traces its history to the late 19th century. (The earliest media coverage about the program ran in the 1900–1901 academic year.) Since its founding, the boys' ice hockey team has captured 16 NJISAA Prep B Titles (1928, 1974–1975, 1980, 1982–1984, 1991, 1997, 2005, 2007–2010, 2012, and 2013 (co-champion)). The team won the Gordon Cup of the Gordon Conference in 1965 and 1966. Jon Vlachos, star center on those teams, received induction into the NJ High School Ice Hockey Hall of Fame in 2012.

Since joining the Morris County Conference, the boys' ice hockey team has won 10 Mennen Cups (1980, 1982–1983, 1994 (co-champion), 2006, 2009–2011, 2014, and 2015). Head Coach John Puskar earned the NJ Boys Ice Hockey Coach of the Year Award twice during his tenure from 2003 to 2009. In 2009, Former NHL player Randy Velischek took over as Head Coach of the boys' ice hockey team. Under his leadership, the sixth-ranked 2013–14 boys' ice hockey team defeated Delbarton School to reach the non-public state championship for the first time in school history. After tying Christian Brothers Academy in overtime of the state championship game on March 9, 2014, Morristown Beard School earned a share of the non-public state title. They finished the 2013–14 season with an overall record of 21–5–2. On April 7, 2014, the New Jersey Devils honored Morristown Beard's hockey team during a game at Prudential Center played against the Calgary Flames.

During the late 1920s and early 1930s, the hockey team competed against Kent School in holiday rivalry games played at Madison Square Garden. They played for the Ranger trophy donated by Colonel John S. Hammond, first president of the New York Rangers. After receiving a personal message of good luck from President Franklin Roosevelt, the team went on an overseas tour in Europe during the 1933–1934 school year. They competed against several club and school teams from Switzerland, Germany, and France.

==== Girls' ice hockey team ====
The girls' ice hockey team began competition in the Women's Interscholastic Hockey League of the Mid-Atlantic (WIHLMA) in 2005. Since then, the team has won the league championship seven times (2007–2008, 2010–2014). The girls' hockey team notched their fifth straight WIHLMA title in a game played against Portledge School from Locust Valley, New York, on February 16, 2014. The team finished as the runner-up to Shady Side Academy in 2015,

On April 13, 2014, the New Jersey Devils awarded player Kendall Cornine '15 their High School Ice Hockey Girls' Player of the Year Award during a game against the Boston Bruins. Cornine, who played the position of forward, notched 26 goals and 24 assists during the season and earned All-State selection from The Star-Ledger. In 2015, NJ.com selected Cornine as their Girls Ice Hockey Player of the Year for 2014–2015 after she became Morristown Beard's all-time scoring leader. During her high school career, Cornine notched 104 goals and 94 assists to accumulate 198 total points in 75 games.

During the 2010–2011 school year, the girls' hockey achieved an undefeated 18–0 season during the 2010–2011 academic year. The girls' ice hockey team also notched 45 consecutive victories during the period from January 10, 2010, to February 15, 2012. Former NHL player Bruce Driver, who played on a Stanley Cup-winning NJ Devils team, has coached the girls' ice hockey team since the 2000–2001 season. He received the NJ Girls Ice Hockey Coach of the Year Award in 2007 and earned his 200th win in December 2013. Driver's daughter Whitney, Morristown Beard Class of 2004, played on the girls' ice hockey team, as well as on the softball and girls' soccer teams. She also helped create the school's sportsmanship award.

=== Football ===
Morristown Beard School's football team has a history that dates back to 1898. Coached by Princeton graduate Irvin Dickey and then Dartmouth graduate D.B. Rich, Morristown School's football team won 22 of 25 games (88%) during the 1898–1900 seasons. Speedy Harold Hathaway Weekes, who graduated in 1899, played a pivotal role in the team's success during the 1898 season. After playing his college career for the Columbia Lions football team of Columbia University, Weekes received induction into the College Football Hall of Fame in 1954. His brother, Bradford Gage Weekes, followed in Harold's footsteps during his own notable football career at Morristown School.

Continuing this success through the 20th century, the football team achieved 11 undefeated seasons (1901, 1911, 1914, 1916, 1919, 1936, 1937, 1939, 1941, 1948, 1987). They won the state championship in 1987 and finished as runner-up for the state championship at Giants Stadium in 2007. Theatre critic John Mason Brown, who received the superlatives of "Best All-Around", "Most Popular", Wittiest", at graduation, played guard on the football team during his years at the school (1917–1919).

=== Baseball and softball ===
Morristown Beard School's baseball team won the 2005 and 2010 NJSIAA Non-Public North B state championships. They also captured the 2007 Prep B state championship. John Sheppard, Head Coach of the baseball team, notched his 400th win in 2016, defeating Randolph High School to win the Morris County Tournament, the first tournament title in school history. On March 30, 2014, he received induction into the New Jersey Scholastic Coaches Hall of Fame. Pitching coach Mike Sturgeon trained Boston Red Sox pitcher Rick Porcello during his days at Seton Hall Preparatory School. (Sturgeon is also an alumnus of the high school.)

In 1984 and 1986, Morristown Beard School's softball team won titles. Spike Billings, who served for many years as the school's athletic director, and visual arts teacher Laurie Hartman coached those teams. Morristown Beard School elected Billings to its Athletics Hall of Fame in 1998.

=== Boys' and girls' soccer ===
In 2014, the girls' and boys' soccer teams finished runner-up for the Non-Public North B state title at DePaul Catholic in Wayne, New Jersey. The girls' soccer team won the Prep B Title in 2004 (shared with Rutgers Prep) and 2013. The boys' soccer team won the state championship in both 1968 and 1974. George Tilghman, who served as headmaster of Morristown School (1926–1939), played on the soccer team during his years as a student at the school.

In 2018, the girls soccer team finished the season with a 10–9–3 record after defeating St. Rose High School by a score of 2–0 to win the Non-Public B state championship at Kean University.

=== Boys' and girls' basketball ===
The boys' basketball team debuted in the 1910–1911 school year. In 2011 and 2012, the team won consecutive conference championships in under Head Coach Eddie Franz. Franz netted his 300th win as Head Coach in 2013. He also received induction into the New Jersey Scholastic Coaches Association (NJSCA) Hall of Fame that year. Marquis Webb, a former Rutgers basketball player, has been head coach of the boys' basketball since 2023.

In 2014, the girls' basketball team won their conference in 2014 for the first time in school history. The team reached the quarterfinal round of the Morris County Tournament for the first time after defeating Morris Knolls High School. On March 15, 2015, the girls' basketball team defeated the Pennington School to capture the Prep B title for the first time in school history.

Leading Scorers By Season
Season	Name	Points Scored (Season)	Points Per Game(Season)
2024–25	MJ Jarrell	559	21.5
2023–24	MJ Jarrell	395	17.2
2022–23	Max Masino	244	11.1
2021–22	Jaron Afuola	235	13.1
2020–21	Justin Axelrad	144	12.0
2019–20	Justin Axelrad	389	14.9
2018–19	John Martin	241	10.0
2017–18	Justin Rodriguez	438	17.5
2016–17	*No Data*	*No Data*	*No Data*
2015–16	Brian Monaghan	496	18.3
2014–15	Brian Monaghan	436	16.7
2013–14	Stephen Sangree	302	12.8

=== Cross country and track ===
The boys' cross country team achieved consecutive undefeated 17–0 seasons in 1960 and 1961. They won the Prep B title in both seasons.

=== Lacrosse ===
The boys' lacrosse team defeated Immaculata High School to win the Non-Public B state championship in 2008 and 2019, and won the Prep B Title in 2008 and 2009. The girls' lacrosse team won the Prep B title in 2009, 2010, and 2014.

=== Tennis ===
The girls' tennis team won the Prep B title and the conference championship in an undefeated 12–0 season in 2011.

=== Volleyball ===
The girls' volleyball team went undefeated in the 1986 season and captured the state championship.

=== Golf ===
The golf team won the school's first Prep B Title in the sport in 2009.

=== Field hockey ===
The girls' field hockey team has won the Prep B title in both 2008 and 2011.

=== Discontinued sports ===
==== Wrestling ====
Before its merger with the Beard School, Morristown School had a highly successful wrestling team. The wrestling team won three consecutive NJSIS Class B Championships from 1964 to 1966. In 1999, Morristown Beard School honored the 1965 wrestling team by electing it to the Athletics Hall of Fame.

== Notable alumni ==
Morristown Beard School alumni have collectively received election to selective national societies for achievements in the arts, literature, science, theatre, and athletics. They have also attained several nationally prestigious awards. Morristown Beard School alumni have received the Presidential Medal of Freedom, the Distinguished Service Cross, the National Intelligence Distinguished Service Medal, the Distinguished Honor Award, the Medal for Merit, and France's Legion of Honour and Croix de Guerre for achievements in governmental and military service. For achievements in literature and journalism, they have attained a Newbery Medal, two Caldecott Honor Awards, The Bollingen Prize, the Peabody Award, three Emmy Awards, and the Library of Congress' Children's Book of the Year Award. Morristown Beard School alumni have attained the Vetlesen Prize (the highest award in geology/geophysics), the American Chemical Society's Industry Award, the Alexander Agassiz Medal, and a Rhodes Scholarship for achievements in science, innovation, and scholarship. Their humanitarian accomplishments have earned Lions Clubs International's Lions Humanitarian Award and the National Coalition of Hispanic Mental Health and Human Services' National Humanitarian Award. Morristown Beard School alumni have also captured gold medals in the Olympics and the Pan American Games.

=== Architects, designers, and engineers ===
- Julie Beckman (class of 1991), architect who co-designed the National 9/11 Pentagon Memorial
- Sandra Carpenter (1934–2003, class of 1952), Hilton Hotels' chief information officer
- Reginald Davis Johnson (1882–1952, class of 1900), California architect and designer of 2 National Historic Landmarks: Hale Solar Laboratory and Baldwin Hills Village
- Winthrop Jones (1917–1999), artist, architect, and designer of schools and public buildings
- Clive Meredith (1892–1932, class of 1910), radio engineer and founding owner of WSYR-AM, Syracuse's 2nd oldest station; grandson of Congressman Anson Burlingame
- Samuel Shackford Otis (1891–1974, class of 1910), Illinois architect and designer of hotels and housing complexes
- Austie Rollinson (class of 1986), principal designer for Callaway Golf's research and development unit; designed custom putters for Phil Mickelson and Ernie Els

=== Athletes and coaches ===
- Ingersoll Arnold (1915–2004, class of 1935), hockey player, coach, and referee
- Arthur Ayrault Jr. (1935–1990, class of 1952), two-time Olympic gold medalist in rowing (1956 Olympics and 1960 Olympics) and 7th headmaster at Lakeside School
- Trevor Baptiste (born 1996, class of 2014), professional lacrosse midfielder for Atlas LC.
- Penelope Probert Boorman (class of 1951), Pan American Games gold medalist in swimming and champion equestrian
- Nancy Tasman Brower (class of 1947), former coach and athletic director who launched 4 girls' lacrosse programs
- Kendall Cornine (born 1996, class of 2015), ice hockey forward for the Metropolitan Riveters of the NWHL.
- Harry Fanok (born 1940), Major League Baseball pitcher for the St. Louis Cardinals
- Charlotte Glutting (1910–1996, class of 1927), amateur golfer and member of the U.S. Women's Amateur Golf Team for three Curtis Cups
- Anna Harrington (class of 2008), All-American archer on a Columbia Lions team that won the gold medal at the Intercollegiate Archery Championships
- Suzanne Hoyt (1934–2010, class of 1952), champion equestrian, philanthropist, and rancher
- Carl Kinscherf (1919–2006, class of 1938), National Football League defensive back and punter on the New York Giants (1943–1944)
- Dan McHale, college basketball coach (class of 1997)
- Dwight Mayer (1927–2013, class of 1945), champion croquet player and first president of PGA National's Croquet Club; descendant of Declaration of Independence signer Samuel Huntington
- Holly Ponichtera (class of 2003), figure skater on four national championship teams at Dartmouth College
- Ann Probert (class of 1960), amateur golfer, 14-time winner of the Garden State Championship, and past co-chair of the Curtis Cup
- Ernest Savignano (1919–1994, class of 1938), assistant athletic coach at Brown University and football player for the Brown Bears
- Jackman Stewart (1930–2000, class of 1950), athletic director and coach at the Berkshire School
- Jyles Tucker (born 1983, class of 2003), National Football League linebacker for the San Diego Chargers
- Harold Weekes (1880–1950, class of 1899), three-time Walter Camp All-American, captain of the Columbia Lions football team, and College Football Hall of Fame inductee
- Alice Francis Wolf (1907–1990, class of 1924), squash and tennis player who reached the ranking of 10th best U.S. woman's player

=== Authors, illustrators, and publishers ===
- Lindsay Barrett George (born 1952, class of 1970), children's writer, illustrator, and recipient of the Library of Congress Children's Book of the Year Award
- Esther Eberstadt Brooke (1894–1987, class of 1915), vocational counselor, author of seven books, and sister of policy adviser Ferdinand Eberstadt
- John Mason Brown (1900–1969, class of 1919), theatre critic for The Saturday Review, author of 13 books, and great-great-grandson of U.S. Senator John Brown of Kentucky
- Roger Burlingame (1889–1967, class of 1909), book editor at Charles Scribner's Sons, author of 26 non-fiction books, and grandson of Congressman Anson Burlingame
- Frank Damrosch Jr. (1888–1966, class of 1906), author, Episcopal priest, and son of Frank Damrosch, founder of the Institute of Musical Art (now the Juilliard School)
- Elizabeth Hoffman Honness (1904–2003, class of 1922), novelist and author of 20 children's books
- Hannah Lyons Bourne (1942–1999, class of 1959), author of eight children's books, including three cookbooks
- Charles Morton (1899–1967, class of 1916), Associate Editor of The Atlantic Monthly and author of 6 books
- William Pène du Bois (1916–1993, class of 1934), Newbery Award recipient and founding art editor of The Paris Review; son of painter Guy Pène du Bois
- Frederick Roberts Rinehart (1902–1981, class of 1920), co-founder of Farrar & Rinehart and Rinehart & Co.; son of famed mystery writer Mary Roberts Rinehart
- Stanley Rinehart Jr. (1897–1969, class of 1915), co-founder of Farrar & Rinehart and Rinehart & Co.; son of famed mystery writer Mary Roberts Rhinehart
- Margaret Farrand Thorp (1891–1970, class of 1909), English professor at Smith College, author of 7 books, and niece of Cornell University President Livingston Farrand
- Jim Weaver (class of 1981), author and Share Our Strength Chef of the Year for activities addressing childhood hunger

=== Business executives and financial professionals ===
- John Vernou Bouvier III, father of First Lady Jacqueline Kennedy
- Edward G. Chace (class of 1900), vice president and treasurer of Berkshire Fine Spinning Associates, a predecessor of Berkshire Hathaway
- William C. Dabney (class of 1912), president of Devoe & Raynolds Company (paints) and first soldier from Louisville, Kentucky, injured in World War I
- Edward M. Douglas (class of 1921), senior IBM executive and vice president of sales and special administrative matters
- Gerald W. Fogelson (class of 1951), president of Fogelson Group (real estate) who developed properties in eight states and Chicago's Central Station
- George Delancey Harris (class of 1914), president of D.P. Harris Manufacturing Co., an early manufacturer of bicycles and roller skates
- Alfred S. Harris (class of 1909), president of Harris-Seybold (now Harris Corporation) and offset printing innovator
- Walter Elsaesser (class of 1942), senior Pan-American Airlines executive and divisional vice president for Atlantic operations
- José Ferré (class of 1920), Puerto Rican businessman, government official, and brother of Puerto Rican Governor Luis Ferré
- Connie Kemmerer (class of 1962), co-owner of Jackson Hole Mountain Resort in Jackson Hole, Wyoming
- Harris L. Kempner (class of 1920), chairman of the Board of Imperial Sugar, president of H. L. Kempner Co., and Galveston, Texas, philanthropist
- Isaac Herbert Kempner Jr. (class of 1924), president of Imperial Sugar and Galveston, Texas philanthropist
- Kenneth Komoski (class of 1946), founding executive director of the Educational Products Information Exchange Institute
- Felix Knauth (class of 1914), executive director of the Latin American Economic Institute in Boston
- Oswald Knauth (class of 1905), executive vice president of Macy's, president of Associated Dry Goods, and head of NYC Bureau of Economic Relief
- Louis LaMotte (1896–1984, class of 1914), senior IBM executive and one of IBM's 50 Builders; father of Peter LaMotte, the NY Mets' first team physician
- Naneen Neubohn (class of 1957), managing director of Morgan Stanley's London office and co-director of the Frankfurt, Germany, office
- George W. Merck (class of 1911), president of Merck & Co. and head of the U.S. War Research Service during World War II
- Jamie Siminoff (class of 1995), entrepreneur and inventor; founder of Ring, acquired by Amazon.
- Donald Stralem (class of 1920), president of the National Travelers Aid Association and partner at Hallgarten & Company
- Walter Tuckerman (class of 1899), developer of Bethesda, Maryland's Edgemoor neighborhood and co-founder of Burning Tree Club; descendant of Declaration of Independence signer Oliver Wolcott
- Thomas Watson Jr., former CEO of IBM, U.S. Ambassador to the Soviet Union, and son of IBM founder Thomas J. Watson
- Finn Wentworth (class of 1976), President and CEO of the New Jersey (now Brooklyn) Nets; co-founder of the YES TV Network; real estate investor
- Harvey Ladew Williams Jr. (1900–1986, class of 1916), founding board member of American Airlines and President of the United States Council for International Business; descendant of Roger Williams

=== Civil rights advocates, civic leaders, and humanitarians ===
- Jane Barus (class of 1909), delegate to the New Jersey Constitutional Convention that drafted the current NJ State Constitution
- Justin Brande (class of 1935), founding executive director of the Vermont Natural Resources Council; son of writer Dorothea Brande
- Rosamond Carr (class of 1929), founder of Imbabazi, a Gisenyi, Rwanda organization providing educational, skills training, and income generating opportunities
- Helen Day (class of 1904), social worker, child welfare advocate, and head of Sheltering Arms in New York City
- Mary Dyckman (class of 1905), social worker and labor law activist for state laws regulating child labor and migrant labor
- Randolph Guggenheimer (class of 1924), lawyer, philanthropist, co-founder of North General Hospital in Harlem, and nephew of civic leader Samuel Untermyer
- Katherine C. Kelly (1942), Electoral College Delegate and advocate for women's rights and LGBT rights
- Margaret C. McCulloch (class of 1919), civil rights activist who supported racial integration in Tennessee
- Virginia Mathews (class of 1942), literacy advocate who helped develop Sesame Street and co-founded the American Indian Library Association; daughter of author John Joseph Mathews
- Scott Michael Robertson (class of 1999), disability rights activist, co-founder Autistic Self Advocacy Network (ASAN, 2006)
- Marjory Swope (class of 1958), executive director of the New Hampshire Association of Conservation Commissions

=== Government officials ===
- Eleanor Bontecou (class of 1909), World War II war crimes investigator at the U.S. Department of War and civil rights attorney at the U.S. Department of Justice
- Luis A. Ferré (class of 1920), Governor of Puerto Rico and recipient of the Presidential Medal of Freedom
- Dorcas Hardy (class of 1964), first woman commissioner of the U.S. Social Security Administration (1986–1989)
- Alfred Jaretzki Jr. (class of 1909), special consultant to Secretary of War Henry Stimson and a drafter of the Investment Company Act
- Theodore Knauth (class of 1903) chief of religious affairs for the American Zone of Occupation in Germany after World War II
- Joseph Nye (class of 1954), National Intelligence Council Chairman and political scientist who co-founded neoliberalism and soft power (international relations)
- David W. K. Peacock Jr. (class of 1942), Deputy Undersecretary at the U.S. Department of Commerce
- Herbert Pell, Congressman from New York, UN War Crimes Commission's U.S. Representative, and father of U.S. Senator Claiborne Pell
- Marcie Berman Ries (class of 1968), U.S. Ambassador to Bulgaria; former U.S. Ambassador to Albania.

=== Journalists and writers ===
- Warren Bobrow (class of 1980), journalist, author, chef, and master mixologist for several liquor brands
- Georgianna Brennan (class of 1954), society editor for The Newark Star-Ledger and daughter-in-law of U.S. Supreme Court Justice William Brennan
- Herbert Brucker, editor-in-chief of The Hartford Courant and president of the American Society of Newspaper Editors
- Kendall Foss (class of 1923), journalist and contributing editor to Time magazine who helped found the Free University of Berlin
- William A. Greene (class of 1932), public relations official who headed the Crusade for Freedom to fund Radio Free Europe
- Victor Knauth (class of 1914), editor-in-chief of The Bridgeport Times-Star and owner of two radio stations
- Betty Fible Martin (class of 1925), journalist and writer for The New York Times and other periodicals
- Marion Clyde McCarroll (class of 1910), first woman journalist issued a press pass by the New York Stock Exchange
- Churchill Newcomb (class of 1918), sports journalist and great-grandnephew of the donors of the land for Churchill Downs, the Kentucky Derby's home
- John Reed (class of 1906) journalist who wrote Ten Days that Shook the World, the only American buried in the Kremlin, and subject of the Oscar-winning film Reds.
- Alan Rinehart (class of 1919), writer, producer, and playwright; son of mystery writer Mary Roberts Rinehart
- Jeffrey Schaub (class of 1977), broadcast journalist and recipient of 3 Emmy Awards and a Peabody Award
- Samuel T. Williamson (class of 1912), founding editor-in-chief of Newsweek magazine and New York Times White House correspondent (Harding Administration)

=== Physicians and healthcare advocates ===
- Aubrey Barr (class of 1985), marathon runner, cancer treatment advocate, and namesake of Memorial Sloan-Kettering Cancer Center's Aubrey Fund.
- Alfred Jaretzki III (class of 1937), Columbia University medical professor who helped develop vascular surgery and clinical research standards for myasthenia gravis; son of Alfred Jaretzki Jr. and husband of filmmaker Alexandra Isles
- Martha MacGuffie (class of 1942), surgeon and founder of SHARE Africa, which supports communities affected by HIV/AIDS in Africa
- Eliot Porter (class of 1920), biomedical researcher and nature photographer who popularized color photography in landscape photography
- Judith Tobin (class of 1944), physician and Assistant State Medical Examiner for Delaware

=== Military officers ===
- David Guy (class of 1915), pilot in the Lafayette Flying Corps during World War I
- Carter Harman (class of 1936), helicopter pilot for the first U.S. military helicopter mission during World War II and executive with CRI Records
- Samuel T. Hubbard Jr. (class of 1903), military intelligence officer who served on General John Pershing's staff during World War I
- James Rogers McConnell, co-founder of the elite Lafayette Escadrille in the French Air Service in World War I
- David S. Pallister (class of 1934), vice commander of Pease Air Force Base in New Hampshire
- Charles W. Plummer (class of 1910), World War I aviator and recipient of the Distinguished Service Cross for defending a reconnaissance squadron

=== Performing artists and media personalities ===
- Kathryn Allison (class of 2010), actor and winner of the New York Musical Theatre Festival's 2014 Next Big Broadway Sensation contest
- Prince Lorenzo Borghese, Italian-American businessman who starred on the ABC-TV show The Bachelor
- Joan Caulfield, actress in Broadway plays, films, and situational TV comedies
- Eleanor Caulkins (class of 1954), namesake of the Ellie Caulkins Opera House at the Denver Performing Arts Complex
- Jeff Grace (class of 1992), independent film director, producer, and writer
- Herbert Dudley Hale Jr. (class of 1910), documentary film producer at RKO Pathé for the U.S. State Department, Air Force, and Army.
- Basil Durant (class of 1909), ballroom dancer who performed in vaudeville and other shows.
- Jennifer Heller Wold (class of 1980), former SiriusXM radio host and co-founder of dating service Rose & Heller
- Hurd Hatfield, actor who starred in The Picture of Dorian Gray and other movies, as well as TV shows
- Ted Jewett (class of 1922), character actor on NBC radio, including The March of Time and Cavalcade of America
- Nancy Lessler (class of 1964), ballroom dancer and 2-time winner of the Fred Astaire national ballroom dancing competition
- Rachel Moss (class of 2013), Off Broadway actor and TV guest star
- Isabel Pearse (class of 1930), actress who starred in plays in New York City, Maryland, and Michigan
- Christina Ricci, Emmy-nominated actor
- Gus Schirmer Jr. (1918–1992), actor, director/producer, and agent who discovered Lee Remick, Shirley Jones, and Sandy Duncan
- Elizabeth Schultz Rigg (class of 1939), ballroom dancer, singer, and pianist; descent of Declaration of Independence signer Francis Lightfoot Lee
- Sloan Simpson, First Lady of New York City during Mayor William O'Dwyer's administration; fashion commentator on TV/radio, fashion consultant, and model
- Will Taggart (class of 2013), former School of Rock All Star

=== Educators, scientists, and scholars ===
- Mary Travis Arny (class of 1928), biology professor at Montclair State College (now Montclair State University), naturalist, historian, and author
- John A. Carpenter (class of 1938), Fordham University history professor who studied the Reconstruction era
- Maunsell Crosby (class of 1904), ornithologist and close friend of U.S. President Franklin Roosevelt; son of reformer Ernest Howard Crosby
- Chapman Grant (class of 1906), herpetologist, historian, and grandson of U.S. President Ulysses Grant
- Martha Leeb Hadzi (class of 1937), archeologist and art history professor at 4 of the Seven Sisters (Vassar, Smith, Wellesley, and Mount Holyoke)
- James M. Howard Jr. (1922–2002, class of 1938), 13th headmaster of Blair Academy
- Ridgely Hunt Jr. (class of 1905), supervisor of the Yale University libraries and grandson of U.S. Navy Secretary William H. Hunt
- Barrington Moore Sr. (1883–1966), forester and father of sociologist Barrington Moore Jr.; great-grandson of Clement Clarke Moore, author of "The Night Before Christmas"
- Walter C. Pitman III (class of 1949), Columbia University geophysicist whose research evidenced the Morley–Vine–Matthews hypothesis of seafloor spreading
- Katharine Lambert Richards Rockwell (class of 1909), theology professor at Smith College and sister of physician Dickinson W. Richards
- George Hammond Tilghman (class of 1915), 3rd headmaster of the Morristown School and military officer
- Brenda Pruden Winnewisser (class of 1957), physicist and oral historian who helped develop the study of terahertz spectroscopy

=== Visual artists and poets ===
- Nathaniel Choate (class of 1918), sculptor, painter, and inductee of the National Academy of Design
- Eleanor Maurice (class of 1921), abstract and realist painter; recipient of Audubon Artists' Emily Lowe Memorial Award
- Craig Slaff (class of 1978), aviation artist and recipient of the National Museum of Naval Aviation's Director's Choice Award.
- Gertrude Tiemer (class of 1915), painter, photographer, and poet
- John Hall Wheelock (class of 1904), editor, poet, and 13th recipient of the Robert Frost Medal

== Notable faculty, staff, and coaches ==
- Katharine Fleming Branson, first headmistress of the Branson School
- Thomas Bradley Buffum (1924–1930; 1932–1938), military aviator and member of the elite Lafayette Flying Corps in World War I
- Thomas J. Campbell (1912–1913), athletic director at the Morristown School and head football coach at three colleges and universities: Bowdoin College, the University of North Carolina and the University of Virginia
- Bruce Driver (born 1962), former NHL player on a Stanley-Cup winning New Jersey Devils team.
- Stearns Morse (1921–1923), English professor at Dartmouth College and head of the English Department at Morristown School
- Alice Rumph (1922–1942), painter, etcher, and co-founder of the Birmingham Art Club, which established the Birmingham Museum of Art
- Katherine Binney Shippen (1917–1926), children's writer and 2-time recipient of the Newbery Honor Award
- Maud Thompson (1918–1926), educator, suffragist, speaker, and writer
- Randy Velischek (born 1962), former NHL player for the New Jersey Devils, Minnesota North Stars and Quebec Nordiques.

== Notable trustees and advisory board members ==
- Jerome Davis Greene, banker and head of John D. Rockefeller's business and philanthropic interests
- John Grier Hibben, president of Princeton University
- Henry Smith Pritchett, president of the Carnegie Foundation for the Advancement of Teaching
- Charles Scribner II, president of Charles Scribner's Sons publishing company; founding president of the Board of Trustees at the Morristown School and namesake of its Scribner Field for baseball games after him
- Anson Phelps Stokes, philanthropist, civil rights activist, and clergyman
- Grinnell Willis, second president of the Morristown School's Board of Trustees and funder of its gymnasium and Headmaster House (now the Alumni House); son of noted poet Nathaniel Parker Willis

== Heads of school ==
=== St. Bartholomew's School ===
Rev. Frank E. Edwards (1891–1898)

=== Morristown School ===
- Francis Woodman (1898–1917)
- Arthur Pierce Butler (1917–1926)
- George Tilghman (1926–1939)
- Rev. James Holiday Stone Fair (1939–1940)
- Rev. Earl N. Evans (1940–1942)
- Valleau Wilkie (1942–1956)
- Thompson D. Grant (1956–1971)

=== Beard School ===
- Lucie C. Beard (1891–1946)
- Sara Clarke Turner (1946–1948)
- Edith M. Sutherland (1948–1970)
- George Burr (1970–1971)

=== Morristown-Beard School ===
- Thompson D. Grant (1971–1974)
- Philip L. Anderson (1974–1992)
- William C. Mules (1992–1998)
- L. Laird Davis (1998–2004)
- Alex Curtis (2004–2011)
- Peter J. Caldwell (2011–2021)
- Liz Morrison (2021–2025)
- Philicia Levinson (Interim - 2025)
- Ryan Liese (2026 - present)
