= Georgianna Brennan =

American journalist

Georgianna Alexandra Franklin Brennan is a former journalist. Brennan is the daughter-in-law of the late U.S. Supreme Court Justice William Joseph Brennan Jr. and the wife of the late New Jersey assistant general William Joseph Brennan III. She worked as a features writer for the Newark Star Ledger in Newark, New Jersey and served as the newspaper's society editor.

== Early life and education ==
Brennan graduated from the Beard School (now the Morristown-Beard School) in Orange, New Jersey. She studied in Italy and France after earning her bachelor's degree from Sarah Lawrence College in Bronxville, New York. During her years at the college, New Jersey Governor Robert Meyner crowned her as the state's first debutante queen. She represented New Jersey at the first annual American Debutane's Ball at the Miami Biltmore Hotel in Miami, Florida.

== Characterization of Justice Brennan ==
In 2010, Brennan challenged the Irish ethnic stereotypes attributed to her father-in-law and others while speaking at a panel discussion hosted by the Newark Historical Society. She described him as a hardworking man who had made hard sacrifices to pursue his lifelong goal of social justice. Brennan said that he had to borrow from friends to help pay for his children's college education.

== Family ==
Brennan married William J. Brennan III in her parents' home in South Orange, New Jersey on September 10, 1960. They had one son, William J. Brennan IV. She also had a daughter, Alexandra Vera Brennan, who died in 2004.
