= Walter Elsaesser =

Walter Alexander Elsaesser (1924–1999) was a businessman. He served as an executive with Pan American Airlines for 31 years and rose to the position of Divisional Vice President for Atlantic Operations. After retiring from the airline, Elsaesser served with the International Executive Service Corps; he assisted the development of the tourism and hospitality industry in Bulgaria, Zimbabwe, Russia, Latvia, and Ukraine.

== Early life and education ==
Elsaesser was born on February 18, 1924, in Morristown, New Jersey. He attended the Morristown School (now the Morristown-Beard School). During his time at the school, he served as senior prefect (a student leadership role selected by faculty). Elsaesser also played on the school's ice hockey team and served as its team captain. After graduating from the Morristown School in 1942, he entered Princeton University in Princeton, New Jersey. Elsaesser studied at the university for six months before leaving to join the U.S. Army Air Forces as a pilot. While serving from February 1943 to July 1946, he flew the P-40, the B-24, and the B-17.

Returning to Princeton, Elsaesser completed his bachelor's degree in economics in 1949. During his time at the university, he played for the Princeton Tigers men's ice hockey team. Elsaesser tied for the team's top scoring honor during the 1947-1948 hockey season.

== Career with Pan Am ==
Elsaesser joined Pan Am as a salesman after completing his college studies at Princeton. After opening the airline's Pittsburgh office in 1954, he served as a district sales manager from 1955-1959. Elsaesser then assumed the role of director of sales for the Southwest market. In 1970, Pan Am established 10 marketing regions for its national and international operations. The airline named Elsaesser one of the ten marketing region heads when it tasked him with serving as regional vice president for sales in the Western United States.

In 1972, Elsaesser took on the leadership role of Divisional Vice President for the Atlantic at Pan Am. He oversaw all airline operations and sales in Europe, Africa, the Middle East, and India.

== Letter to Carter ==
In 1980, Elsaesser wrote a letter to President Jimmy Carter to express his concerns with U.S. tax policies for American citizens living abroad. Elsaesser asserted in the letter that the policies led to increased hiring of foreign nationals for jobs overseas. He also asserted that this situation deterred American companies from operating overseas.

== Family ==
Elsaesser married Barbara Elsaesser in 1949. They had four children: Walt, Jr., Thomas, Robert, and Mary. His granddaughter is Katie Elsasser, actress and comedian.
