= Holly Ponichtera =

American immunologist and figure skater

Holly Ponichtera is an immunologist and a former competitive figure skater who competed for Dartmouth College in Hanover, New Hampshire. Ponichtera played on figure skating teams at Dartmouth that won the national championship in four consecutive years.

== Early life and education ==
Ponichtera grew up in Gladstone, New Jersey. She began figure skating at age five and also raced horses as a child. Ponichtera captured the championship title for the Mini-Stirrup B Division at the 1995 New Jersey Horse Show Association's Silver Anniversary.

During her high school years, Ponichtera competed as a figure skater at the American Academy Figure Skating Club in Hackensack, New Jersey. She performed at the opening ceremony for the dedication of the Twin Oaks Ice Rink in Morristown, New Jersey in 2001. After advancing to the 2001-2002 Eastern Sectional Championship, Ponichtera placed twelfth in the final standings. Ponichtera graduated from Morristown-Beard School in Morristown, New Jersey in 2003. In 2014, Ponichtera delivered the keynote address at the school's induction ceremony for the Cum Laude Society.

== Figure skating performances ==
While competing at the national collegiate championship in figure skating in 2006, she captured gold medals in both the junior ladies freestyle and junior ladies short programs. Ponichtera also earned entry into Dartmouth's Wearer of the Green Honors, the school's athletic hall of fame. She was the tenth player in figure skating to attain the Honors. During the four-year title run, which began in 2004, Ponichtera and her teammates went undefeated in competition.

== Graduate studies and immunology research ==
Ponichtera earned her bachelor's degree in biology at Dartmouth in 2007. She then completed her master's degree in biology at Tufts University in Medford, Massachusetts and her PhD in immunology at Tufts University School of Medicine in 2014. During her doctoral studies, Ponichtera helped discover an innate cell receptor (CD209a) linked to the development of T helper 17 cells and inflammation in schistosomiasis. Schistosomiasis is a disease caused by Schistosoma, parasitic worms commonly known as blood-flukes.
