= Alfred S. Harris =

American businessman

Alfred Stull Harris (1891–1947) was an American businessman from Ohio. Harris led innovations in the development and use of the automatic printing press at Harris-Seybold, which later became Harris Corporation. During a 35-year career at the company founded by his father, he held leadership positions that included vice president of engineering, president, and director.

== Early life and education ==
Harris was born to Alfred F. Harris and Minnie Stull Harris, a granddaughter of Scottish Western Reserve settlers, in Warren, Ohio, on June 10, 1891. After graduating from the Morristown School (now Morristown-Beard School) in Morristown, New Jersey, Harris attended Princeton University in Princeton, New Jersey. He then attended the University of Virginia in Charlottesville, Virginia, until 1912. Later that year, Harris left school to begin his career at Harris Automatic Press Company, the family business. Harris worked as a draftsman in the engineering department until taking on the position of road technician in 1922.

== Leadership at Harris-Seybold ==
Harris rose to vice president in change of engineering at Harris-Seybold in 1923. Twenty one years later, the company made him its president. Harris succeeded Ray V. Mitchell.

While heading engineering initiatives, Harris led the company's development and advancement of offset printing using the lithography. His innovations in this area included the first modern two-color offset and the first process for four-color offsets. Harris also oversaw Harris-Seybold's installation of a research lab to facilitate innovation in lithography and graphic arts. At the time of its creation, the lab was one of the most advanced in the world for this purpose. During his career, Harris served on the board of the Lithographic Technical Foundation.

== Patents ==
While at Harris-Seybold, Harris originated two significant patented inventions. In 1941, he filed a patent with the U.S. Patent and Trademark Office for "Perfecting printing press". As of 2014, 15 patents about printing machines (filed between 1945 and 1990) reference his invention. In 1937, Harris and Charles W. Harrold jointly filed a patent for "Inker throw-off". Sixteen patents about ink use in printing (filed between 1945 and 1984) reference this invention as of 2014. Harris also filed a patent in 1945 for "Sheet-fed offset perfecting press".

== Family ==
Harris married Marie Goering Harris in Warren, Ohio, on June 17, 1916. They had three children together: Alfred Stull Jr., Josephine, and Charles Conrad.
