= Brenda Pruden Winnewisser =

Brenda Pruden Winnewisser is a scientist and oral historian. Winnewisser has collaborated on Manfred Winnewisser's research in terahertz science and technology. According to Microsoft Academic Search, she has 122 research publications (as of 2014).

== Early life and education ==
Winnewisser grew up in Newark, New Jersey and South Orange, New Jersey. She graduated from the Beard School (now Morristown-Beard School) in Orange, New Jersey in 1957. Winnewisser then completed her undergraduate studies at Wellesley College in Wellesley, Massachusetts in 1961. Her role model at Wellesley, Janet Brown Guernsey, encouraged her to pursue a career in physics. After earning her PhD from Duke University in Durham, North Carolina, Winnewisser received a fellowship from the Alexander von Humboldt Foundation.

== Oral history projects ==
Winnewisser conducts oral history projects on physics pioneers in collaboration with the Center for the History of Physics at the American Institute of Physics in College Park, Maryland. She has published books and other works on Hedwig Kohn, Walter Gordy, and other figures.

== Family ==
Winnewisser was married to Manfred Winnewisser (1934-2021), a professor of physics at Ohio State University in Columbus, Ohio. They married in South Orange, New Jersey in 1965.
