= Finn Wentworth =

American businessman

- Born: Francis Xavier Wentworth Jr. 1958 (age 67–68); Morristown, New Jersey, United States
- Education: Lehigh University
- Occupations: Entrepreneur, philanthropist
- Known for: Former CEO of Yankeenets holding company for the New York Yankees
- Spouse: Kim Wentworth
- Children: 2

Francis “Finn” Xavier Wentworth Jr. (born 1958) is an American entrepreneur, philanthropist, and investor in major commercial real estate and professional sports ventures in the United States. This included the New York Yankees, New Jersey Nets, and New Jersey Devils.

== Early life and education ==
Wentworth was born in Morristown, New Jersey in 1958 and attended Morristown-Beard School. He graduated from Lehigh University in Bethlehem, Pennsylvania in 1980, where he became a member of the Board of Trustees. Wentworth majored in marketing, was in the Delta Phi fraternity, the Social Chairman for the Interfraternity Council (IFC) and, on the rugby, cross country, and track teams. Wentworth was a miler in track and field and a fullback for rugby.

== Career ==
Wentworth was COO and CEO of Yankeenets, the holding company for the New York Yankees, New Jersey Nets, and New Jersey Devils professional sports teams. As an owner who also served as the leading executive of those franchises.

Wentworth was one of the founders of the YES Network national sports network along with Leo Hindery. Wentworth has also held the position of President and CEO of the New Jersey Nets NBA team. During his tenure with the teams, the Yankees won two world championships, the Devils won two Stanley Cups, and the Nets twice won the NBA Eastern Conference finals.

Wentworth is an owner and founding partner of Normandy Real Estate Partners based in Morristown, New Jersey, with offices in Washington D.C., New York City, and Boston, Massachusetts. Prior to starting Normandy and his involvement in professional sports, Wentworth was one of the founders of the Gale and Wentworth real estate company.

== Other interests ==
Wentworth is a trustee of the Yogi Berra Museum and Learning Center. He has also served on the board of the Princeton National Regatta Association, an organization that supports the U.S. Olympic Rowing Team, and received the Jack Kelly Citizenship Award from the U.S. Rowing Association.
