= Jane Barus =

Jane Ellen (Garey) Barus (1892 – August 9, 1977) was a civil rights leader and suffrage advocate. Barus served as a delegate to New Jersey's 1947 Constitutional Convention, which drafted the constitution in current use (as of 2015). She also led activities to promote social justice and reform of municipal services.

== Early life and education ==
Born Jane Garey in Kansas City, Missouri, she grew up in South Orange, New Jersey. Barus graduated in 1909 from the Beard School (now Morristown-Beard School) in Orange, New Jersey. She then completed her bachelor's degree in psychology at Smith College in Northampton, Massachusetts in 1913 and received induction into Phi Beta Kappa society. After graduating, Barus taught mathematics to students at Miss Beard's School. She received her master's degree in educational psychology from New York University in Manhattan in 1942.

== New Jersey Constitutional Convention ==
Barus served as one of eight woman delegates to the 1947 Constitutional Convention held in New Jersey. She represented Essex County and served as Secretary of the convention's Committee on the Executive, Militia, and Civil Officers. The convention drafted the currently adopted New Jersey State Constitution, which voters ratified on November 4, 1947.

== Social justice and reform activities ==
Barus led activities to promote social justice in Northern New Jersey and reform municipal services. Some of her activities are:

Women's suffrage and justice system reform

Barus served as president of the New Jersey League of Women Voters (1943-1947), and she chaired the Nominations Committee of the national League of Women Voters. In 1957, Barus founded the New Jersey Association of Correction to advocate for prison reform and promote social justice and human dignity in criminal justice programs. She also served on the State Juvenile Court Revision Committee to promote similar goals for young offenders.

Housing and municipal needs

Barus served on New Jersey state commissions that studied needs of people with chronic illness and explored programs for emergency rations. She served as vice chair of the Citizen's State Committee on Municipal Government and as a member of the Essex County Council against Discrimination. Barus also helped establish a book distribution program for underprivileged children in Newark, New Jersey. In 1937, she chaired the Mayor's Committee on Housing in Montclair, New Jersey. Barus then chaired the Montclair Housing Authority from 1938 to 1943.

== Legacy ==
The New Jersey Historical Society, a museum and state historical society in Newark, New Jersey, houses papers, photographs, and correspondences of Jane Barus (1947-1977). The collection focuses on her work as an activist with the League of Women Voters, delegate to the New Jersey Constitutional Convention, and prison reformer.
