= Anna Harrington =

American archer

Anna Christine Harrington is an American archer who played for the Columbia Lions of Columbia University. Competing alongside Sarah Chai and Marilyn He, Harrington helped lead the team to victory at the 2011 U.S. Intercollegiate Archery Championships (USIAC). Defeating the Texas A&M Aggies, the core won the recurve division title to capture a gold medal. The following year, Harrington's team finished third at the USIAC to capture a bronze medal.

== Early life and education ==
Harrington grew up in Bernardsville, New Jersey, and she graduated from Morristown-Beard School in Morristown, New Jersey, in 2008. During her junior archery career, Harrington ranked eleventh among all junior players in the U.S. Competing at the National Indoor Championships, she placed seventh. Harrington placed fifth in the ranking round of the national championship for youth archery. She also received selection to the 2008 U.S. Junior Dream Team. During Harrington's first semester at Columbia, the TV program "Sportslife NYC" on the YES Network highlighted her athletic aspirations.

== College archery career ==
In 2012, Harrington received selection to the U.S. Collegiate Archery Association's All-America Team. That year, she captured gold medals in the women's recurve and compound divisions at the Eastern Regional Intercollegiate Archery Championships. Harrington also helped lead the Columbia Lions to a team gold medal in the women's recurve division. She received selection to the All-East Women's Recurve Team during all four years of her college career (2008–2012).

== 2008 Youth World Championships ==
After starting her freshman year at Columbia, Harrington competed at the 2008 FITA Youth World Championships held in Antalya, Turkey. Harrington placed 22nd out of 75 archers in the Junior Women's Recurve Division, which marked the best performance by an American.
