= Marjory Swope =

American conservationist (1940–2007)

Marjory Mason Swope (1940–2007) was a conservationist, environmentalist, and civic leader. Swope served as executive director of the New Hampshire Association of Conservation Commissions (1981-2006) and chaired the Concord Conservation Commission.

== Early life and education ==
Swope was born in Orange, New Jersey to Virgil and Edith Rae Mason Swope on June 5, 1940. She graduated from the Beard School (now Morristown-Beard School) in 1958. Swope then completed her bachelor's degree at Mount Holyoke College in South Hadley, Massachusetts in 1962.

== Civic work ==
Swope served in multiple civic roles for the city of Concord, New Hampshire. She served on the city council for 11 years (1996-2007) and on the school board for six years (1975-1981). Swope ran the League of Women Voters office in Concord. She also served on the board of directors of the Turkey River Basin Trust and on Groundwork Concord's committee for the improvement of green spaces in the city.

== Environmental Honors and Swope Park ==
Swope earned notoriety as the "grandmother" of local conservation commissions. In 2007, the U.S. Environmental Protection Agency awarded her their Environmental Merit Lifetime Achievement Award, one of their highest honors. That year, the Society for the Protection of New Hampshire Forests awarded Swope their Sarah Thorne Conservation Award. Swope also had an honorary membership in the New Hampshire Association of Natural Resource Scientists. In 2012, Concord held a ceremony to name a 77-acre park near Long Pond after her. Swope's husband John and her family donated the land for the park to the city.

== Family ==
Swope married John Swope in 1962. John Swope's grandfather, Gerard Swope, served as the third president of General Electric. His father served as the company's international counsel and headed Woods Hole Marine Biological Laboratory.
