= Martha Leeb Hadzi =

American art historian

Martha Leeb Hadzi (1919–2003) was an art historian and an archeologist.

== Early life and education ==
Hadzi was born on December 24, 1919. She grew up in Montclair, New Jersey, United States, and graduated from the Beard School (now the Morristown-Beard School) in Orange, New Jersey in 1937. Hadzi then earned her bachelor's degree at Vassar College in Poughkeepsie, New York. She completed her master's degree at the Institute of Fine Arts at New York University in New York City and her PhD at Yale University in New Haven, Connecticut.

During her master's studies, Hadzi completed a Fulbright fellowship, and participated in an archeological excavation at Samothrace, a Greek island in the Mediterranean Sea. In 1955, the American Academy in Rome awarded her their Rome Prize, a fellowship for resident scholarship at the academy. She completed her PhD dissertation on sculptural portraits of Gallenius, a third century Roman emperor, during the fellowship.

== Career in art history and archeology ==
Hadzi served as the corresponding Italy editor for Art in America, an international magazine for contemporary art, and as a writer for Art Bulletin and Renaissance Quarterly. While working as a professor of art history, she taught classes at Bennett College. She also taught at four of the Seven Sisters: Vassar, Smith College, Wellesley College, and Mount Holyoke College. Hadzi achieved renown as an authority on ancient Greek art.

== Family ==
In 1954, Hadzi married sculptor Dimitri Hadzi at the Campidoglio in Rome. They had two children together. Hadzi and Dimitri Hadzi later divorced during the 1980s.
