= Felix Knauth =

American writer and business executive

Felix Whitman Knauth (1895–1993) was a writer and business executive. Knauth served as the executive director of the Latin American Economic Institute in Boston, Massachusetts, and as an accounting manager in the dry goods industry. He also served on the editorial staff of The New York Evening Post.

== Early life and education ==
Knauth was born to Percival Knauth and Mary Iles Whitman in New York City on June 10, 1895. He graduated from Morristown School (now Morristown-Beard School) in Morristown, New Jersey in 1914. Knauth then began his college studies at Harvard University in Cambridge, Massachusetts as a member of the class of 1918. During his time at the school, Knauth served on the editorial board of the Harvard Lampoon, a humor magazine. He completed his master's degree in education at Harvard in 1940.

== Military service and career ==
In 1917, Knauth enlisted with the U.S. Army in 1917 to serve in the European Theatre of World War I. Knauth served with the 101st Field Artillery Regiment of the New England Division of the American Expeditionary Forces. He participated in the battles of Chemin des Dames, Battle of Saint-Mihiel, Pont-à-Mousson, and Château Thierry.

After receiving a severe injury in fighting during the Battle of Chateau Thierry on specifically, July 20, 1918, Knauth returned to the United States. He worked as a control counselor at R. H. Macy's and then joined the Latin American Institute as its execute director.

== Boy Scouts of America ==
Knauth served as a scout master with the Boy Scouts of America in Massachusetts. He led the scout troop whose scouts included former Governor Michael Dukakis, the Democratic nominee for President in 1988. Knauth also volunteered at the Boy Scouts' Philmont Scout Ranch near Cimarron, New Mexico.

== Family ==
Knauth married Harriot Kunhardt on June 16, 1923. They had a daughter together, Hildegard Kunhardt Knauth, who attended Beaver Country Day School and Stephens College in Columbia, Missouri. She worked in New York City, with jobs including work as the assistant to Blanche Gaines, whose clients included Rod Serling, Frank Gilroy, and Hildy's future husband, Frederic Fortescue Manley. Felix Knauth and wife Harriot also had a son together, Felix Kunhardt Knauth. Felix Kunhardt Knauth served with the Peace Corps in India and helped found Oxfam America, the United States branch of Oxfam International.
