= Francis Woodman =

American school administrator (1864–1959)

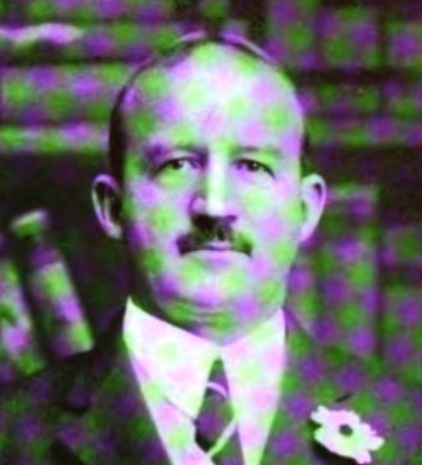
- Born: Francis Call Woodman; June 13, 1864; Jamaica Plain, Boston, Massachusetts, US
- Died: September 4, 1959 (aged 95); Jamaica Plain, Boston, Massachusetts, US
- Education: Harvard University
- Occupation: School headmaster
- Employer: Morristown School

Francis Call Woodman (June 13, 1864 – September 4, 1959) was an American teacher and educational administrator. Woodman co-founded the Morristown School (now the Morristown-Beard School) in Morristown, New Jersey and was its headmaster for nineteen years.

== Early life ==
Woodman was born on June 13, 1864. He grew up in Jamaica Plain, a historic neighborhood of Boston, Massachusetts. His parents were Anna Gaietti call and George Frederick Woodman. He attended from Roxbury Latin School.

Woodman then completed his undergraduate studies at Harvard University in 1888. During his studies at Harvard, Woodman played the positions of left tackle and placekicker for the Harvard Crimson football team in 1886, 1887, and 1888 with the nickname of "Jumbo". In an exhibition game played against Phillips Exeter Academy, Woodman successfully kicked twenty field goals. The game had a final score of 154-0. Woodman was also the captain for Harvard's freshman crew team. He belonged to Delta Kappa Epsilon (aka The Dickey Club).

== Career ==
Following graduation from college, Woodman joined the publishing firm Longmans, Green, & Co. (now an imprint of Pearson PLC). He served as head of the educational department at their New York City office for seven years.

In 1896, he joined the faculty of a boys' school in Morristown, New Jersey. When the school failed in 1899, Butler and former Harvard University classmates Arthur Pierce Butler and Thomas Quincy Brown Jr. purchased the school and reorganized it as the Morristown School (now the Morristown Beard School) as a liberal and progressive preparatory school. Woodman was the school's first headmaster during its first nineteen years, from 1898 to 1917.

Woodman later worked as an independent education consultant after his retirement. During World War I, Woodman served as an educational advisor for the YMCA in France.

== Personal life ==
When he was 77 years old, Woodman married Melanie Martha Muller in Newburyport, Massachusetts on June 29, 1943. Muller was the head of the Art Department at Colby College.

Woodman belonged to the Civic Association of Morristown.

When Woodman fell ill in 1948, four Harvard football players from the 1947 team, including the team captain, donated blood to assist his recovery. He died at the Rogerson House in Jamaica Plain, on September 4, 1959 at the age of 95.
