= Martha MacGuffie =

American reconstructive and plastic surgeon (1924–2011)

- Born: Martha MacGuffie; 22 January 1924; New York City
- Died: 7 March 2011 (aged 87); Nyack, New York
- Education: Beard School; Cornell University; Columbia University College of Physicians and Surgeons
- Occupations: Reconstructive and plastic surgeon
- Years active: 1949–2008
- Employer(s): Nyack Hospital, Nyack, New York (1950–2005)
- Known for: SHARE Africa, international AIDS charity
- Website: shareafrica.org

Martha M. MacGuffie (1924–2011) (nicknamed "Bobby") was the first woman reconstructive and plastic surgeon to graduate from the College of Physicians and Surgeons at Columbia University, in 1949. She was also the first woman surgeon to serve on the staff of a major suburban hospital, at Nyack Hospital in Nyack, New York. Macguffie helped establish the burns unit there and developed a water bed to reduce pain experienced by burn patients. During her 50-year medical career, MacGuffie treated over 50,000 patients. In 2003, the journal P&S published by the College of Physicians and Surgeons at Columbia named her to their list of 15 "P&S Graduates who Helped Change the World". She died on March 7, 2011.

== Early life and education ==
MacGuffie graduated from the Beard School in Orange, New Jersey (now Morristown-Beard School) in 1942. In 1995, Morristown-Beard School awarded her their Distinguished Alumni Award. She received her bachelor's degree from Cornell University in 1946 and her medical degree from Columbia in 1949. MacGuffie then completed her medical internship at New York-Presbyterian Hospital in New York City in 1950. Starting on her job search, Macguffie asked for a recommendation from Columbia's Dean of Medicine. His recommendation read, "This woman is large, powerful, and tireless."

== Philanthropy ==
=== AIDS treatment activism ===
MacGuffie co-founded the Society for Hospital and Resources Exchange (SHARE) as an international nonprofit organization to promote greater treatment services for AIDS in Africa. SHARE has built medical facilities, organized mobile clinics, and provided training on AIDS. They have also provided education, social services, health services, and basic necessities to children orphaned by AIDS in Western Kenya. The deaths of two of MacGuffie's children from AIDS because of tainted blood transfusions for Fanconi anemia inspired her work to improve worldwide treatment of the disease.

=== Recognition and legacy ===
In 1998, Lions Clubs International awarded Macguffie their Lions' Humanitarian Award, which has also honored the work of Mother Teresa, Jimmy Carter, Tim Shriver, and Danny Kaye. The Helen Hayes Hospital Foundation presented her their Helen Hayes MacArthur Award in 2003. The New York State Senate awarded her their Women of Distinction Award in 2011.
