= Margaret C. McCulloch =

American civil rights activist and writer

Margaret Callender McCulloch (16 January 1901 – 8 March 1996) was an American writer, teacher, and activist during the civil rights movement. McCulloch authored several books and articles on race relations and the segregation of African Americans, as well as two biographies. Her most influential books included Segregation, a Challenge to Democracy and Integration: Promise, Process, Problems. The Amistad Research Center at Tulane University in New Orleans, Louisiana houses McCulloch's articles, speeches, and correspondences.

== Education and teaching career ==
McCulloch was born in Orange, New Jersey and attended the Episcopal Church during her childhood. The impact of rheumatoid arthritis meant that she was often home from school. In 1919, McCulloch graduated from the Beard School (now Morristown-Beard School). She completed her bachelor's degree at Wellesley College in Wellesley, Massachusetts in 1923 after receiving induction into Phi Beta Kappa. Returning to the Beard School, McCulloch taught classes for two years. After moving to Frogmore, South Carolina, McCulloch taught for nine years at the Penn School. Run by Quakers, the school taught black students on St. Helena Island, a sea island in Beaufort County, South Carolina.

After earning a master's degree in history from the University of North Carolina, McCulloch moved to Memphis, Tennessee. She worked as a professor of history and sociology at LeMoyne College (now LeMoyne–Owen College), a historically black college. McCulloch also taught at Fisk University, a historically black college in Nashville, Tennessee. While at Fisk, she helped sociologist Charles S. Johnson publish a study on racial integration called "Into the Mainstream".

== The Opportunity Foundation Corporation ==
In 1962, McCulloch founded the Opportunity Foundation Corporation (OFC), and she endowed it with $150,000 to provide scholarships to poor students, assist families in financial crisis, and support racial integration. OFC was one of the first private foundations in Memphis, Tennessee to have an interracial board of directors. It dispersed $200,000 before ceasing operations in 1976.

== Harold Lundy's study ==
In 1978, Harold Lundy conducted one of the expert interviews for his dissertation with McCulloch. Lundy's dissertation focused on: "A Study of the Transition from White to Black Presidents at Three Selected Schools Founded by the American Missionary Association". After completing his PhD at the University of Wisconsin-Madison, Lundy went on to serve as the fourth president of Grambling State University in Grambling, Louisiana.

== Works ==
- The Work of Dorothea Lynde Dix for the Insane, 1841-1861 (1933)
- Fearless Advocate of the Right: The Life of Francis Julius Lemoyne, M.D. (1798-1879) (1941)
- Guide to Information about the Negro and Negro-White Adjustment (1943)
- Know, Then Act (Study and Action Pamphlets on Race Relations) (1946)
- Segregation, a Challenge to Democracy (1950)
- Integration: Promise, Process, Problems (1952)
- The Bad Year and the Eye of Faith (1956)
- Desegregation: Smooth and Bumpy (1958)
