= Theodore Knauth =

Investment banker, journalist, and government official

Theodore Whitman Knauth (1885–1962) was an investment banker, journalist, and government official. His career included reporting as a war correspondent from Europe for NBC Radio during the early years of World War II and service for the U.S. government in the American Zone of Occupation.

== Early life and education ==
Knauth was born in New York City on January 13, 1885. He graduated from Morristown School (now Morristown-Beard School) in Morristown, NJ in 1903. Knauth then completed his bachelor's degree at Harvard University in Cambridge, Massachusetts in 1907. While studying at Harvard, he joined the social fraternity Delta Upsilon. Knauth later served as a member of the Board of Trustees of Morristown School alongside fellow Morristown and Harvard graduates George W. Merck and Roger Burlingame. The Board elected Knauth its corporate secretary in 1922 prior to a celebration of the 25th anniversary of the school's founding.

Knauth began his career at the banking firm Knauth, Nachod, and Kuhne in 1907. Founded by his grandfather Franz Theodor Knauth in 1838, the investment firm handled German and international securities. After the firm named Knauth as a partner in 1921, he worked there for 13 years.

== War and post-war activities ==
During World War II, Knauth worked as a war correspondent for NBC News, which aired over NBC's radio networks. Serving from 1938 to 1941, he was one of the first reporters for NBC to cover news of the war directly from Berlin. The Paley Center for Media (formerly the Museum of Television and Radio) houses two of his on-air reports from Berlin in their radio collection. The segments aired on the NBC Radio Networks on June 4, 1940 and June 6, 1940.

After leaving NBC News, Knauth joined the American Red Cross. He worked in their department of prisoner-of-war relief for several years. The department distributed Red Cross parcels as care packages to prisoners of war. During the Allied occupation of Germany, Knauth served as the chief of religious affairs for the American Zone of Occupation.

Knauth served on the board of directors of the Carl Schurz Memorial Foundation, an organization established to improve German-American relations. He also served on the board of directors of the American Chamber of Commerce's regional office in Berlin.

== Family ==
Knauth married Gabriele Roediger (1884–1972), daughter of the factory director Conrad Wilhelm Roediger (Halle, Germany) on February 22, 1912. They had five children: Percival (1914–1995), Otto, Barbara, Christine, and Sybilla. Paralleling the work of his father, Percy Knauth also served as a war correspondent in Berlin during World War II. He reported for The Chicago Tribune, The New York Times, Time Magazine and LIFE Magazine.
