= John A. Carpenter =

American historian

John Alcott Carpenter (1921–1978) was a historian, history professor, and public speaker. Carpenter, who specialized in the Reconstruction Period following the American Civil War, published biographies of Oliver Otis Howard and Ulysses S. Grant.

== Early life and education ==
Carpenter was born to Charles Francis Carpenter and Marion Jewett Carpenter in Boonton, New Jersey on August 1, 1921. His father's active interest in the Civil War piqued his own childhood interest and later career focus. After attending St. John's School (now Wilson School) in Mountain Lakes, New Jersey, Carpenter graduated from Morristown School in Morristown, New Jersey in 1938. He completed his bachelor's degree at Harvard University in Cambridge, Massachusetts in 1942.

Carpenter attended Harvard through a scholarship from the Harvard Club of New Jersey. During his studies at the university, Carpenter played on the rowing team, and he participated in the glee club. He also first connected with Howard while writing a paper on his career in the U.S. Army for a course. After serving for three years in the U.S. Navy during World War II, Carpenter completed a master's degree at Columbia University in 1947. His master's thesis examined industrial development in Paterson, New Jersey between 1792 and 1913. In 1954, Carpenter earned a Ph.D. from Columbia after he studied Howard for his dissertation. His dissertation had the title: An Account of the Civil War Career of Oliver Otis Howard Based on His Private Letters.

== Faculty career ==
In 1957, Carpenter joined the faculty of Washington and Jefferson College in Washington, Pennsylvania as an assistant professor of history and political science. He received a promotion to associate professor in 1960. Carpenter taught at the school until 1965 when he joined the faculty of the Department of History at Fordham University in the Bronx. He served in that role through 1978 and held the position of chair of the department.

During his faculty career, the National Endowment for the Humanities awarded Carpenter grants to fund his research on the Freedmen's Bureau. The American Philosophical Society also funded his research. In 1974, Carpenter contributed his expertise to the 54-part series "The American Presidency: The Men and the Office" on CBS-TV. The 1976 book Power and the Presidency discusses the scholarship presented in the series.

== Public speaking ==
Carpenter earned notoriety among the historian community for his guest lectures. He frequently spoke to civic groups, historical societies, and service groups. In 1967, Carpenter spoke about "Stephen A. Douglas and the Election of 1860" at the convocation program at Sacred Heart University in Fairfield, Connecticut.

== Legacy ==
The John A. Carpenter Research Material Collection at the Schomburg Center for Research in Black Culture at the New York Public Library in New York City houses Carpenter's papers. The collection includes manuscripts, typescripts, research notes, reviews of Carpenter's books, his articles and lectures, and other materials. It also contains his materials for a project biographing all agents of the Freeman's Bureau.

== Books ==
- 1964 Sword and Olive Branch: Oliver Otis Howard
- 1970 Ulysses S. Grant
