= Ingersoll Arnold =

American forester and ice hockey player/coach

Charles Ingersoll Arnold (1915–2004) was an American forester and an ice hockey coach and player. Arnold directed the Russ Forest nursery at Michigan State University, and he later headed the State Forestry Nursery in New Hampshire. Arnold also helped lead the development of youth hockey in the state. In 2010, New Hampshire Legends of Hockey, the state hall of fame, inducted him as a coach.

== Early life and education ==
Arnold was born on July 15, 1915, and he grew up in Woodbridge, Connecticut, a town near New Haven. During his childhood, he played hockey on ponds in rural Connecticut. Arnold then played on the high school hockey team at Morristown School (now Morristown-Beard School) in Morristown, New Jersey. During his four years at the school, Arnold earned recognition for his puck handling and smooth stride during hockey games. As a junior, he played on the 1933-1934 Morristown School hockey team that competed against teams from Europe during an overseas tour. Arnold also played on Morristown School's baseball, track, and cross country teams. He graduated from the school in 1935. In 1994, Morristown-Beard School inducted Arnold into the school's Athletic Hall of Fame.

After high school, Arnold began his college studies in mathematics at Bowdoin College in Brunswick, Maine, and he continued his hockey career. In 1935, Arnold became the first freshman to make the men's varsity hockey team at Bowdoin. During his junior year, The Boston Globe selected him for their All New England team. Arnold graduated from Bowdoin in 1939. As an alumnus, he continued to attend home and away games of the school's hockey team. In 1992, the school awarded Arnold a plaque to recognize his status as the Bowdoin Polar Bears' number one fan. Bowdoin awarded him the school's Polar Beard Award in 1999. The Polar Beard Award recognizes "significant personal contributions and outstanding dedication to Bowdoin"

Arnold completed his master's degree in forestry at the School of Forestry at Yale University in 1941. During his studies at the school, he played on Senior hockey teams. The 1940 team performed well at the National Invitational Tournament in Lake Placid, New York, and came close to winning the tournament.

== Military service during World War II ==
Following his graduate studies at Yale, Arnold worked first for the U.S. Forest Service at Arrowhead Ranger Station in Skyforest, California, a community in San Bernardino County. He also worked as a timber cruiser for Hollingsworth & Whitney Company's paper mill in Mobile, Alabama. In 1942, Arnold joined the U.S. Army as an officer. He served in a unit of the U.S. Army's Field Artillery Branch and then in the U.S. Army's Infantry Branch. Arnold earned several service medals during his tour of duty, including a Purple Heart. He also played on a U.S. Army hockey team that won the European Theater of Operations Ice Hockey Championship.

== Forestry career ==
Following World War II, Arnold worked as a logging operator for the New Hampshire Forestry Foundation. He managed logging jobs throughout central New Hampshire. During the winter spanning 1947 and 1948, Arnold taught botany at New England College in Henniker, New Hampshire, and he worked for the New Hampshire Department of Transportation. In 1948, Arnold moved to Michigan to teach at Michigan State University's Forestry Summer Camp. He also began working as the director of the university's Russ Forest operations. Overseeing the forest nursery, Arnold expanded tree development from 400,000 trees per year to 3,500,000. He also conducted forestry research.

In 1958, Arnold moved back to New England to serve as director of the New Hampshire State Forest Nursery. While serving in that role for 23 years, Arnold led mechanization of the nursery. He also developed a machine to facilitate bundling seeds for shipment, and he conducted forestry research.

== Youth hockey development ==
During the 1950s and 1960s, Arnold officiated youth and high school hockey games in Concord, New Hampshire. In 1959, he helped found the Concord Youth Hockey Association (CYHA). Arnold served as a volunteer for the association during the next 25 years. He also coached youth hockey teams at the mite and squirt levels for 20 years. In 1985, the CYHA awarded Arnold a plaque to commemorate his long-term service to the association and its teams. Twenty years later, the CYHA created the Ingy Arnold Good Sportsmanship Trophy for players on the mite traveling team. The association also named a tuition scholarship for mite players after Arnold.

== Family ==
In 1942, Arnold married Dorothy Spoor. They had a daughter, Anne. Daughter Anne was married in 1982 to Walter Field and they had a daughter Alice Arnold Field, born in 1984.
