= Elizabeth Schultz Rigg =

American singer

Elizabeth (Schultz) Rigg (1921–2001) was a singer and pianist who was a direct descent of Francis Lightfoot Lee, a signer of the United States Declaration of Independence. Rigg worked as a Cabaret actress. Adopting the stage name of Suzanne Gilbert, she performed at the American Theatre Wing, the Biltmore Hotel, and the Stage Door Canteen in New York City. Performing in the Fred Astaire ballroom dance competitions, Rigg won multiple first place awards. She also starred in the play Toys in the Attic, performed at the Hudson Guild in Manhattan in 1972.

== Early life and education ==
Rigg was born in New York City on June 9, 1921 to Mabel LaVie Schultz and William Lightfoot Schultz. She grew up in Morristown, New Jersey and then Short Hills, New Jersey. Her father, William Schultz, founded Shulton Inc., the original maker of the Old Spice brand of deodorant.

During her childhood, Rigg constructed a model airplane with a 12-foot wingspan in her family's basement. She also wrote letters about her aviation interests that she sent to aviator Amelia Earhart, President Herbert Hoover, and the U.S. War Department. The letters requested the creation of a U.S. Army Air Corps for women who could not afford to purchase their own planes.

In 1939, Rigg graduated from the Beard School in Orange, New Jersey (now Morristown-Beard School). After studying at the Juilliard School in New York City, she completed her bachelor's degree with a concentration in music at Sarah Lawrence College in Yonkers, New York in 1943. During her time at Sarah Lawrence College, Rigg served as president of the Voice Club and vice president of the chorus. She also chaired the Sarah Lawrence College War Board, which aimed to support U.S. troops fighting in World War II. Rigg's later philanthropy for Sarah Lawrence College established the Betty Schultz Rigg Scholarships, which primarily support students with high financial needs and students studying music.

== Schultz Foundation ==
Rigg served as the vice president of the Schultz Foundation and as a member of its board of trustees. The family foundation provided financial support to medical and educational organizations, as well as other nonprofit organizations. In 1992, the Schultz Foundation gave $3 million to endow facilities for leukemia research at Memorial Sloan-Kettering Cancer Center in Manhattan. That year, the Schultz Foundation also gave $10 million to construct a laboratory building for molecular biology at Princeton University in Princeton, New Jersey.

== Family ==
Elizabeth Rigg married William Cecil Rigg on January 8, 1960. They had three children: William, Geoffrey, and Douglas.
