= Sandra Carpenter =

American businessperson (1934–2003)

Sandra Mitchell Carpenter
- Born: February 4, 1934; Des Moines, Iowa, U.S.
- Died: July 16, 2003 (aged 69); Philadelphia, Pennsylvania, U.S.
- Education: Smith College (BA, 1956)
- Occupations: Systems engineer, CIO, Executive
- Employer(s): IBM; Hilton Hotels; Quanex Corp. Rosenbluth Travel
- Known for: First woman systems engineer, instructor, and sales rep at IBM; Pioneering female CIO in the travel industry
- Awards: Feminist of the Year (NOW, 1975); Top 100 CIOs (CIO Magazine)

Sandra Mitchell Carpenter (1934–2003) was an American corporate executive, engineer, and information technology professional. During the 1980s, Carpenter served as corporate vice president for information management systems at Hilton Hotels. She was one of the first women to serve as a chief information officer (CIO) at a company with more than $1 billion in revenue. During her tenure at Hilton, CIO magazine named the company to their list of the top ten travel service IT Innovators. Carpenter also received placement on CIO Magazine's list of the top 100 CIOs.

== Early life and education ==
Carpenter was born in Des Moines, Iowa on February 4, 1934. She grew up in several Midwestern cities and then in Short Hills, New Jersey. In 1952, Carpenter graduated from the Beard School in Orange, NJ (now Morristown-Beard School). She then completed her bachelor's degree in literature at Smith College in Northampton, MA in 1956. Carpenter co-chaired a reception of the Smith College Clubs of Los Angeles and Pasadena to launch the $125 million fundraising campaign for the school in 1988.

== Information technology career ==
In the 1960s, Carpenter joined IBM as a systems engineer, instructor, and sales representative. She was the first woman to take on all three of these roles at the company. Carpenter later served as director of information systems at Quanex Corp., an industrial company in Houston, Texas, and chief information officer at Rosenbluth Travel in Philadelphia during the 1990s.

Rosenbluth, the fifth largest travel agency in the U.S. at the time, had a corporate client list that included Walmart, DuPont, Nike, Inc., and Chevron Corporation. Carpenter led the automation of Rosenblauth's booking system, which had previously relied on manual entry.

== Service work ==
Carpenter founded the first woman's shelter in the Detroit, Michigan suburbs. She helped organize the Michigan chapter of the National Organization for Women (NOW) and served as the founding president of NOW's Oakland County chapter. in 1975, the Wayne County chapter of NOW awarded Carpenter their Feminist of the Year Award.

== Personal life ==
After her college studies, Sandra Carpenter married Nick de Kuyper and moved to Europe to live with him. They had one son, John and divorced in 1961. In 1964, Sandra Carpenter married widower Robert Carpenter. She adopted his four children: Robert, John, Kristin and Charles. Sandra Carpenter and Robert Carpenter divorced in 1980.
