= Dwight Mayer =

Dwight J. Mayer (1927–2013) was a croquet player. Mayer served as the first president of the Croquet Club at PGA National in Palm Beach Gardens, Florida, the largest croquet club in the Western U.S. He also served as chair of croquet at the Beach Club in Palm Beach, Florida for 17 years.

== Early life ==
Mayer was born in Stockton, California to Gertrude Seward Mayer and A. Kenneth Mayer in 1927. He graduated from the Morristown School (now Morristown-Beard School) in Morristown, New Jersey in 1945. While at the school, Mayer played on the football team and earned all-state honors. He also served as captain of the baseball team.

In December 1945, Mayer enlisted with the U.S. Army to serve in World War II. He completed his bachelor's degree at St. Lawrence University in Canton, New York in 1952. During his time at St. Lawrence, Mayer played on the baseball team and served as team captain.

== Croquet career ==
During his croquet career, Mayer achieved status as a scratch player after he earned a zero handicap. He won the Master Doubles Championship of the United States Croquet Association (USCA) in 2000 and 2002. Mayer also won the USCA's Master Singles Championship twice.

== Industry career ==
Mayer served as the national marketing manager for Grow Chemical. He also served as the president and CEO of VIP Packaging, a commercial art and graphic design firm in Hillside, New Jersey.

== Notable ancestry ==
Mayer descended directly from Samuel Huntington, a signer of the Declaration of Independence, who served as first president of the Continental Congress. He also descended from William H. Seward, Secretary of State under President Abraham Lincoln, and Simeon North, inventor of the milling machine.
