= Oswald Knauth =

American economist and business executive

Oswald Whitman Knauth (1887–1962) was an economist and business executive. Knauth served as an executive at both R. H. Macy & Co. (Now Macy's) and Associated Dry Goods Corporation (now part of Macy's). He helped found the National Bureau of Economic Research. Knauth also served as president of the board of directors of the American Economic Association and as a member of the Council on Foreign Relations.

== Early life and education ==
Knauth was born to Percival Knauth and Mary Iles Whitman in New York City on June 3, 1887. After attending the Trinity School in New York City, he graduated from the Morristown School (now the Morristown-Beard School)] in Morristown, New Jersey in 1905. During his high school years, Knauth played on Morristown School's football team. He completed his bachelor's degree at Harvard University in Cambridge, Massachusetts with the highest honors in 1909. During his studies at Harvard, Knauth served as a business editor of The Harvard Lampoon.

After his undergraduate studies, Knauth worked for the American Bank Note Company, an international engraver of currency and postage stamps. He completed his Ph.D. at Columbia University in Manhattan in 1913. Knauth then served as an instructor and assistant professor of economics at Princeton University in Princeton, New Jersey until 1916. After leaving his job at Princeton, Knauth wrote editorials for The New York Evening Post (now The New York Post).

== Service during World Wars I and II ==
During World War I, Knauth enlisted with the U.S. Army. He served with the 106th Field Artillery Regiment of the 27th Infantry Division of the American Expeditionary Forces in France. Knauth participated in the Battle of Verdun and the Meuse-Argonne Offensive. After his return to the United States, the U.S. Army awarded him the Distinguished Service Medal.

Following the U.S. entrance into World War II, Knauth served in several roles to assist U.S. military operations. He served as assistant director of the Statistics Division of the War Production Board in 1942 and as a consultant to the Quartermaster General from 1942 to 1943. Knauth served as a consultant to the Army Service Forces from 1942 to 1944.

== Executive leadership ==
Between the two world wars, Knauth wrote articles and other works on economics and finance, foreign exchange, and related subjects. He joined the National Bureau of Economic Research in 1919 and then worked as a staff economist at the bureau for the next three years. In 1923, Knauth began working as an economist for Macy's. Rapidly achieving a high profile at the company, Knauth reorganized store layouts to boost sales. He served as an executive vice president and then treasurer of Macy's before taking on the roles of director and merchandising counsel.

In 1935, New York City Mayor Fiorello La Guardia appointed Knauth director of the city's Bureau of Emergency Relief. In this role, Knauth examined the cost of relief projects to improve the economy and stimulate growth. He conducted these activities for only a couple of months before the U.S. took over work relief activities. After resigning as director, Knauth served as president of the Associated Dry Goods Corporation from 1936 to 1943. He taught courses on economics at Columbia University from 1948 to 1951.

== Sailing from Long Island ==
Knauth was a member of Seawanhaka Corinthian Yacht Club, one of the oldest yacht clubs in the U.S. Situated in the town of Oyster Bay, New York on Long Island, the club provides access to the Long Island Sound. Knauth gained widespread notoriety for his expertise on sailing the Sound. He spent summer vacations sailing his boat in the Caribbean Sea. Commenting on his sailing activities in an article in The Brooklyn Daily Eagle, Knauth noted: "You know, I've found that living on a boat is the cheapest way of all. It's much less expensive than if we had a Summer place to keep up."

== Family ==
Knauth married Anna Dixwell Clements. They had three children together: Oliver, Basil, and Arnold.

== Works ==
- Policy of the United States Toward Industrial Monopoly (1914)
- Distribution of Income by States (1923)
- Managerial Enterprise (1948)
- Business Practices, Trade, Position and Competition (1956)
