= Rachel Moss (actress) =

American actress

Rachel Moss is an actor who has starred on Off Broadway plays and TV shows. She has also appeared in commercials for Pepsi and Playhouse Disney.

== Early life and education ==
Moss began her performance career in early childhood. She started dancing at age three. After entering acting at age five, Moss performed in a production of You're a Good Man, Charlie Brown. Four years later, she starred in The People Garden, an Off Broadway show.

During her years in middle school, Moss played the role of a young girl in Summer and Smoke at the Paper Mill Playhouse in Millburn, New Jersey. She graduated from Morristown-Beard School in Morristown, New Jersey in 2013 after receiving the senior theatre award. During her high school studies, Moss participated in the Crimsingers, the school's a cappella group, and on the forensics team. She also starred in the school's productions of Bat Boy: The Musical, A Midsummer Night's Dream, and Bye, Bye Birdie. In 2013, Morris Arts awarded Moss their Elaine Ehlers Arts Scholarship. Funding from the scholarship supported her college studies at Muhlenberg College in Allentown, Pennsylvania.

== Acting career ==
During her acting career, Moss has made guest appearances on network TV series. She has appeared on One Life to Live on ABC-TV, Person of Interest on CBS-TV, and 30 Rock on NBC-TV. Moss also worked as the voice actor for the character Wiffle in the mini-series Wiffle and Fuzz on Playhouse Disney. She played the role of Miniature Girl in The Outskirts.
