= Kendall Foss =

American journalist and author

Kendall Blackstone Foss (1904–1964) was a journalist and writer who helped found the Free University of Berlin in Berlin, Germany, in 1948. He served as liaison and mediator between German students and the American government. Recognizing Foss' role in its creation, the Free University of Berlin awarded Foss an honorary doctorate in 1954. He also had a 30-year career in journalism and writing that focused on foreign relations and business journalism.

== Early life and education ==
Kendall Foss was born on January 24, 1904, in New Rochelle, New York, to Martin Moore Foss and Eliza Kendall Foss. After studying for one year at the Lawrenceville School in Lawrenceville, New Jersey, Foss graduated from Morristown School (now Morristown-Beard School) in Morristown, NJ in 1923. He then received his bachelor's degree from Harvard University in 1927. During his time at Harvard, Foss served as president of The Harvard Advocate, the oldest continually published college art and literary magazine. In 1944, Foss received a Nieman Fellowship, a prestigious mid-career fellowship for journalists, from the Nieman Foundation for Journalism at Harvard.

== Career before World War II ==
Foss began his journalism career in 1927 as a reporter at United Press International's office in London and then as a correspondent for The New York Times in Germany. A few months after taking the job at the Times, he left to go on a year-long journey through the Soviet Union. He detailed his travel in the book Black bread and samovars: An account of an unconventional journey through Soviet Russia published in 1930. While living in the Soviet Union, Foss worked as a correspondent for International News Service. Returning to the U.S. in 1932, Foss worked as a reporter for The Washington Post. He later served as a public relations official for the Tennessee Valley Authority and then as a human resources executive with the Rural Electrification Administration (now the Rural Utilities Service).

== War and post-war career ==
In 1944, Foss took on the role of contributing editor of Time Magazine, and he worked as a correspondent and political columnist for The New York Post. Foss then worked as a correspondent for the Die Neue Zeitung, a newspaper established by the U.S. Office of Military Government (OMG). The OMG administered the American Zone of Occupation in Germany and the American-controlled portion of Berlin. Die Neue Zeitung named Foss their editor-in-chief in 1948.

In 1954, Foss helped found Business International Corporation. He then served as managing editor of its weekly business magazine for 10 years.

== Family ==
Kendall Foss married Maryanne Bishop on September 30, 1939. They had two children: Alexandra and Kristiana.
