= William C. Dabney =

American industrialist (1894–1963)

William Cecil Dabney (1894–1963) was an American industrialist and the first soldier from Louisville, Kentucky injured during World War I. Dabney co-founded the Jones-Dabney manufacturer of paints.

== Early life, education, and military service ==
Dabney was born to Samuel G. Dabney and Louise Higgins Allen Dabney in Louisville on November 20, 1894. After attending public schools in Louisville, Dabney completed his high school education at the Morristown School (now Morristown-Beard School) in Morristown, New Jersey. He then studied at the University of Virginia in Charlottesville, Virginia from 1912 to 1913. Dabney served as vice president and general manufacturer of the Jenkins Graphite Lubrication Company from 1916 to 1917.

In 1917, Dabney entered the U.S. army as a lieutenant with the 26th Infantry Regiment of the 1st Infantry Division. He served with the American Expeditionary Forces in France. During the Battle of Soissons in July 1918, Dabney commanded four successive attacks that helped lead the Allied Forces to victory. He received the Distinguished Service Cross for "extraordinary heroism".

== Career in the paint industry ==
In 1919, Saunders P. Jones and Dabney co-founded the Jones-Dabney Varnish Company. Jones-Dabney specialized in industrial paint finishes for the automotive industry, refrigerator production, and the marine and railroad industries. Dabney served as vice president and general manager of the company until its 1938 acquisition by Devoe & Reynolds Company. Dabney then served as a vice president at Devoe. He received a promotion to president of the company in 1950.

During his career, Dabney served as president of the American Paint and Varnish Manufacturers Association. Following his retirement in 1955, he served on the board of directors of the Louisville Chamber of Commerce, one of the oldest metropolitan chambers of commerce.

== American Printing House for the Blind ==
Dabney served as a member of the board of trustees of the American Printing House for the Blind from 1945 to 1963. He served as the organization's president from 1955 to 1963. In 1959, Dabney collaborated with Gibson McCabe, president and publisher of Newsweek, on an effort to record the magazine's contents for blind Americans. The collaboration led to the creation of a new edition of Newsweek. The following year, Dabney authored the book American Printing House for the Blind, Inc., 1858–1960: A Century of Service, which discussed the organization's history. During his tenure as president, Dabney also helped lead the development of a collaboration between the American Printing House for the Blind and IBM.

== Family ==
Dabney married Florence Coleman Joyes Dabney in April 1921. The Dabney-Coleman Joyes collection at the Filson Historical Society in Louisville contains an album of photographs of Dabney and his family. Photographs of Dabney and his military service appear in the Herald-Post Collection at the University of Louisville's library.
