= Katharine Lambert Richards Rockwell =

Katharine Lambert Richards Rockwell (1891–1972) was an American theologian, writer, and professor. Rockwell served as national secretary for the YWCA and as a member of their Board of Trustees for two terms. She also chaired the YWCA's Department of Religious Education.

== Early life and education ==
Rockwell was born in Orange, New Jersey on June 10, 1891, to Dickinson Woodruff Richards and Sally Lambert Richards. She graduated from the Beard School (now Morristown-Beard School) in 1909. Rockwell then completed her bachelor's degree at Smith College in Northampton, Massachusetts in 1913 and received induction into Phi Beta Kappa. In 1918, she received a diploma from the YWCA's training school in New York City. Studying at Teachers College at Columbia University in Manhattan, Rockwell completed her master's degree in 1925 and her Ph.D. in 1934.

== Career in academia ==
Rockwell worked as a professor of religion and biblical literature at Smith College. She served as their director of religious work and social service. Rockwell also worked as an instructor at Teachers College at Columbia University.

== "How Christmas Came to the Sunday-schools" ==
Rockwell authored an influential study titled How Christmas Came to the Sunday-schools for her Ph.D. dissertation. Dodd, Mead and Company and Gryphon Books published editions of the book in 1934. Gryphon Books then published a re-print of the book in 1971. Examining the history of the celebration of Christmas in the U.S., many books reference Rockwell's study, including:

- America's Working Man: Work, Home, and Politics among Blue Collar Property Owners (1985) by David Halle
- Keeping Christmas: The Celebration of an American Holiday (1990) by Philip Reed Rulon
- The December Wars: Religious Symbols and Ceremonies in the Public Square (1993) by Albert J. Menendez
- Christmas in America: A History (1995) by Penne L. Restad
- Consumer Rites: The Buying & Selling of American Holidays (1997) by Leigh Eric Schmidt
- Celebrating the Family: Ethnicity, Consumer Culture, and Family Rituals (2000) by Elizabeth Hafkin Pleck
- Consumption: Objects, Subjects, and Mediations in Consumption (2001) by Daniel Miller
- Material Culture: Critical Concepts in the Social Sciences (2004) by Victor Buchli
- The Cute and the Cool: Wondrous Innocence and Modern American Children's Culture (2004) by Gary S. Cross
- Christmas in Pennsylvania: A Folk-cultural Study (2009) by Alfred Lewis Shoemaker
- Merry Christmas! Celebrating America's Greatest Holiday (2009) by Karal Ann Marling
- The Americans: The Democratic Experience (2010) by Daniel J. Boorstin
- The Battle for Christmas (2010) by Stephen Nissenbaum
- Winter: Five Windows on the Season (2011) by Adam Gopnik
- Cities of God (2013) by David Gange and Michael Ledger-Lomas

== Family ==
Katherine Lambert Richards Rockwell married theologian William Walker Rockwell in South Orange, New Jersey on November 8, 1934, after a courtship at Lake Sunapee (New Hampshire). They had one child, Dorothy, from William's previous marriage. William Rockwell worked as a professor and librarian at Union Theological Seminary (now affiliated with Columbia University) in Manhattan. The Burke Theological Library at the seminary houses a special collection of his papers from 1909 to 1952.

== Published works ==
- The Golden Word: Some Adventures in the Bible (1919)
- How Christmas Came to the Sunday-schools: The Observance of Christmas in the Protestant Church Schools of the United States, and Historical Study (1934)
- Early Portraits of Jesus (1937)
- Out of the Years (1961)
