= Katherine C. Kelly =

American activist

Katherine Crowley Kelly (1924-2011) was a civil rights activist who advocated for women's rights and LGBT rights issues. Kelly served as a delegate to the Electoral College in 1996 and as a delegate to five Democratic National Conventions. In 2011, U.S. Congressman Alcee Hastings commemorated her life's work on the floor of the U.S. House of Representatives.

== Early life and education ==
Kelly was born in New Rochelle, New York on June 20, 1924, and she grew up in South Orange, New Jersey. In 1942, Kelly graduated from the Beard School in Orange, New Jersey (now Morristown-Beard School). She then completed her bachelor's degree at Wellesley College in Wellesley, Massachusetts in 1946.

== Public policy advocacy ==
During the 1980s, Kelly helped lead Americans for Democratic Action. She later served as the vice president of the Florida Women's Political Caucus and as the development director of Women Leaders Online. Kelly also served as the legislative director for Florida's chapter of the National Organization for Women (FLNOW) and as a member of the board of directors of NARAL Pro-Choice America. In 2001, FLNOW awarded her their Outstanding Feminist of the Year Award.

Kelly served as the representative from Palm Beach County to the Florida State Democratic Committee for 26 years. She began serving in 1985 after committee member Christine Mitchell resigned from the post to spend more time with her family. At the time, Kelly had served on the executive committee for the Democratic Party in Palm Beach County for 10 years. Recognizing the impact of her work in public policy, the Democratic Women's Club of Palm Beach County awarded Kelly their Woman of the Year Award in 2008.

== Engineering work ==
Kelly served as a founding member of the Society of Woman Engineers. Following her graduation from college, she worked for Henry L. Crowley & Company, Inc., the family business which manufactured radio electronics components. She rose to the position of vice president.

== Family ==
Kelly married her husband Edward in 1961.
