= Naneen Neubohn =

Naneen Miller (Hunter) Neubohn is a former financial executive at Morgan Stanley. Neubohn served as managing director of Morgan Stanley's office in London, England and then co-directed the company's office in Frankfurt, Germany. In 1997, Euromoney, a financial magazine, named her to their list of the top 50 women in finance.

== Early life and education ==
Neubohn was born in New York City. After graduating from the Beard School (now Morristown-Beard School) in Orange, New Jersey, she earned her bachelor's degree from Smith College in Northampton, Massachusetts. Neubohn graduated magna cum laude and received induction into Phi Beta Kappa. During her junior year at Smith College, she studied overseas at the University of Geneva's Graduate Institute of International Studies in Geneva, Switzerland.

Following her undergraduate studies, Neubohn completed a master's degree in the Nitze School of Advanced International Studies (SAIS) at Johns Hopkins University in Baltimore, Maryland in 1964. During her first year of graduate studies, she attended the SAIS Bologna Center in Bologna, Italy, the Johns Hopkins European campus. Neubohn later served on the university's board of trustees, and she chaired the advisory council for the Bologna Center. She also served as a career mentor to SAIS students and alumni and hosted alumni events for the university in New York City and London. In 1999, Neubohn helped endow the Steve Miller Chair in German Studies at the Bologna Center. That year, Johns Hopkins awarded Neubohn their Heritage Award. The award recognizes alumni and friends of the university who "contributed outstanding service over an extended period to the progress of the University or the activities of the Alumni Association".

In 1974, Neubohn earned her master of business administration degree at Columbia Business School at Columbia University after graduating first in her class. She then joined Morgan Stanley. Neubohn later helped fund the Meyer Feldberg Distinguished Fellowship at the university.

== Financial industry career ==
After joining Morgan Stanley, Neuhohn worked in the company's corporate finance department, its group overseeing capital service markets, and its department of mergers and acquisitions. In 1990, she moved to London to direct Morgan Stanley's group overseeing European corporate restructuring. Neuhohn directed the debt capital markets group before assuming leadership of the London office.

In the fall of 2001, President George W. Bush announced an intention to nominate Neubohn to serve as U.S. executive director of the European Bank for Reconstruction and Development. Bush instead named Mark Sullivan to the post several months later.

== Family ==
Neubohn married Axel Neubohn in 1964. Axel Neubohn formerly served as a vice president and business manager for Citibank's London office. She has two daughters, one son, and six grandchildren.
