= Eleanor Caulkins =

Eleanor Caulkins is a patron of the arts known as the First Lady of Opera in Denver, Colorado. Caulkins is the namesake of the Ellie Caulkins Opera House in the Denver Performing Arts Complex, the second largest performing arts center in the world. In 2011, Opera America awarded her their National Opera Trustee Award.

== Early life and education ==
Born in 1937, Caulkins graduated from the Beard School (now Morristown-Beard School) in Orange, New Jersey in 1954. After marrying her husband, George Caulkins, she moved to Colorado. Caulkins earned her bachelor's degree at the University of Colorado Denver in 1977 after graduating Phi Beta Kappa. During her studies, she took a course titled Opera as Literature taught by English professor Dick Dillon, which sparked her long-term interest in opera. In 2010, the university awarded her their Alumni Recognition Award. The next year, the University of Colorado awarded her an honorary doctorate of humane letters.

== Children ==
Caulkins had five children.

== Opera activities ==
In 1980, Caulkins and Dillon co-founded Friends of Opera as a volunteer group. Friends of Opera worked to bring more performances of opera to the Denver metropolitan area. Two years after its founding, Friends of Opera's efforts merged into Opera Colorado, an opera company that facilitates performances and promotes education and outreach. Caulkins served as the chair of Opera Colorado's board of directors over multiple terms. The organization later named her as an honorary lifetime chair. In 2006, Denver Mayor John Hickenlooper (then the Governor of Colorado) awarded Caulkins a Culture Legacy Award for her service to the city.

Caulkins has served on the board of directors of the Metropolitan Opera Association in New York City. The association runs the Metropolitan Opera House (known as the Met) at the Lincoln Center for Performing Arts. She has also served as the president of Metropolitan Opera's National Council, and chaired Metropolitan Opera's National Patron Program. The Council operates the Metropolitan Opera National Council Auditions, an annual competition in singing.
