= Esther Eberstadt Brooke =

American author

Esther Eberstadt Baldwin (1894–1987), better known as Esther Eberstadt Brooke, was an author and vocational counselor. Baldwin published several books on careers and healthy living. She earned recognition for her expertise in employment opportunities for women during the 1930s and 1940s. Her 1933 article in Good Housekeeping magazine challenged perceptions of how colleges prepared women to enter the workplace in the shifting economy of that time.

== Early life and education ==
Baldwin was born to Edward Frederick and Elinita Contreras Lemcke Eberstadt in East Orange, New Jersey in 1894. She graduated from the Beard School (now Morristown-Beard School) in Orange, New Jersey. Baldwin then completed a bachelor's degree at the College of Notre Dame of Maryland (now Notre Dame of Maryland University) in Baltimore, Maryland in 1919. She completed a second bachelor's degree at the American Institute of Applied Music in New York City and studied Latin at New York University.

Baldwin later served on the board of trustees of the College of Notre Dame of Maryland. In 1954, she funded the Elinita Eberstadt Scholarship at the school in honor of her mother. The College of Notre Dame of Maryland awarded Baldwin an honorary master's degree in 1941 and an honorary doctorate in 1958. Her estate has funded the Baldwin Lecture in the Humanities at the school. Past speakers in the lecture series included communications researcher Najah Abdallah and author Marjane Satrapi.

== Psychological approach to the job search ==
Baldwin applied a psychological mindset to her work as a vocational counselor in New York City during the 22 years she spent in that role. She also brought that mindset to her office settings. Baldwin decorated her offices with light green walls and reproductions by the painter Vincent van Gogh to help her clients feel more at ease. This orientation reflected her belief that women should feel confident and upbeat in the job search process. Baldwin emphasized that women hunting for jobs should also "look your best; talk your best; act your best; bring your best".

== Family ==
Baldwin was a sister of policy adviser Ferdinand Eberstadt, industrialist Rudolph Eberstadt, and Zelie Mercedes (Eberstadt) Leigh. Baldwin was also a half-sister of Edward Emory Eberstadt. On July 25, 1918, Baldwin married lieutenant William Clement Brooke, Jr. After they divorced, she married insurance executive Robert Howe Baldwin on June 23, 1933. Robert Baldwin founded the first aviation insurance company, Aero Insurance Underwriters.

== Works ==
- 1933: The Girl And Her Job: A Handbook for Beginners
- 1941: Business Wants Beginners
- 1941: Career Clinic: The Answer to your Job Problem
- 1941: The Right Job for You and How to Get It
- 1943: Career Guide for Young People and All Who Counsel Them (with Mary Roos)
- 1947: Guide to Career Success
- 1949: You And Your Personality: A Guide to Effective Living
