= Jennifer Heller =

Jennifer Heller Wold, known commonly as Jennifer Heller, is a matchmaker, radio host, and former human resources executive. Heller co-hosted the shows "Lovetalk" and "The Dating Playbook" on the satellite radio service SiriusXM with Susan Rose. "Lovetalk" ran on Sirius XM Stars, and "The Dating Playbook" ran on Sirius XM Stars Too. Heller and Rose co-own the matchmaking firm Rose & Heller .

== Early life and education ==
Heller graduated from Morristown-Beard School in Morristown, New Jersey in 1980. She then completed her bachelor's degree in psychology at Tulane University in New Orleans. After college, Heller worked as a human resources executive at Standard & Poor's Corporation (a unit of Mcgraw-Hill Financial), Bergdorf Goodman, and Office.com (an Internet startup). She also served as the director of human resources at MTV Networks (a unit of Viacom). In 1995, Heller completed a certification at the New School for Social Research on administration of the Myers-Briggs Type Indicator.

== Rose and Heller dating service ==
Heller and Rose co-founded the dating firm Rose & Heller Inc. in 2004 after meeting each other at their children's nursery school. They describe their complementary talents as "Rachael Ray meets Sex and the City". In 2009, an episode of the TV news program Nightline on ABC-TV featured their firm.
