= Helen Day =

Helen Alvord Day (1886–1962) was an American social worker and child welfare advocate. Day headed children's social service organizations in Chicago, Illinois, and New York City between the 1920s and 1940s.

== Early life and education ==
Day grew up in the Oranges, a region of Northern New Jersey. She was a daughter of Stephen D. Day and Elizabeth Martine Day. Her great-grandfather (also named Stephen Day) was a builder of the Oranges. He served as the founding president of Orange Bank and as a New Jersey State Senator. He also served as president of the Morris and Essex Railroad.

Day graduated from the Beard School (now Morristown-Beard School) in Orange, New Jersey in 1904. She then worked as a recreational and playground worker in Orange. During World War I, Day served with the American Red Cross on the Italian Front. She organized stations to feed hungry children on the island of Sicily and in other parts of the country. After the war, Day worked at the nursery of Grace Protestant Episcopal Church in Manhattan. She also served as head resident at the Eli Bates House, a settlement house in the Little Sicily neighborhood of Chicago, Illinois. In 1929, Day contributed materials about Little Sicily for sociologist Harvey Warren Zorbaugh's historical work on Chicago. The book had the title of The Gold Coast and the Slum: A Sociological Study of Chicago’s Near North Side.

== Sheltering Arms ==
In 1925, Day began serving as the superintendent of Sheltering Arms in New York City. Founded in 1864, Sheltering Arms housed children whom others had abandoned or rejected because of chronic illnesses or conditions. After Sheltering Arms merged with the New York Foster Home Service, Day assumed the role of associate director of the new organization. During her career, she presented at the National Conference of Social Work. In 1937, she presented a paper on evaluating a child's developmental progress in social welfare institutions. She emphasized preparing the child for transition to community life as a main goal.

After retiring in 1945, Day supervised program activities at Sheltering Arms Children's Service. She organized a summer camp at Bantam Lake (near Morris, Connecticut) for children served by the agency. Day also helped run other homes for children. She served as assistant director of the Brooklyn Home for Children in Brooklyn, New York. She later served as resident director of the Preston House of the Girls Service League.
