= Eleanor Maurice =

American painter

Eleanor Ingersoll Maurice (1901–1995) was an abstract and realist painter. Her media included oil, watercolor, pencil drawings, and collages.

== Early life, education, and career launch ==
Maurice was born in East Orange, New Jersey, on September 5, 1901, to Eleanore Bond Ingersoll and Charles H. Ingersoll, a politician and an inventor of the dollar pocket watch. She grew up in Montclair, NJ. Maurice graduated from the Beard School in Orange, New Jersey (now the Morristown-Beard School) in 1921. She also studied at the Arts Student League of New York under Frank DuMond and Allen Tucker and the Montclair Musical School under Avery Johnson and Estelle Ream Manon Armstrong. Maurice began her career as a designer and seamstress for fashion entrepreneur Hattie Carnegie.

== Artwork and exhibitions ==
Maurice achieved recognition for her painting of still lifes and landscapes. Her artistic subjects included seascape waterfronts, farms, animals, and flower markets. Maurice drew inspiration to paint these subjects from traveling throughout the world. Recognizing her art's impact, the Audubon Artists, a national association of artists, awarded her their Emily Lowe Memorial Award. The New Jersey Watercolor Society awarded her a Silver Medal of Honor, their highest honor, in 1960.

During her career, Maurice taught at the Art Center of the Oranges, an art gallery in East Orange, New Jersey. (The gallery achieved its notoriety for featuring art by the New Jersey Watercolor Society.) She exhibited at the National Arts Club in Manhattan, the American Watercolor Society, and the Pennsylvania Academy of Fine Arts in Philadelphia, Pennsylvania. She also exhibited at the Parrish Art Museum in Water Mill, New York, and the Newark Museum in Newark, New Jersey. Her work has appeared at the Smithsonian Institution in Washington, D.C., and the Montclair Art Museum in Montclair, New Jersey (her hometown museum), as well as in private collections.

== Family ==
Eleanor Maurice married Raymond Maurice, a photographer, in 1935.
