= Ann Probert =

American golfer (born 1938)

Ann Linen Probert (born December 31, 1938) is an American amateur golfer from New Jersey. Probert has competed in 10 Senior Women's international events and notched 17 holes-in-one during her career. She is a recipient of the United States Golf Association's (USGA) Ike Grainger Award, which recognizes distinguished service to the association over 25 years. (Grainger was a president of the USGA.)

== Early life and education ==
Probert grew up in West Orange, New Jersey near the 18th hole of the Rock Springs Country Club. She graduated from the Beard School (now the Morristown-Beard School) in Orange, New Jersey in 1956. Probert then earned her bachelor's degree at Smith College in Northampton, Massachusetts in 1960. In 1986, Morristown-Beard School inducted Probert into the school's Athletic Hall of Fame.

While playing as a junior, Probert captured the 1956 New Jersey Girls' Golf Championship in Maplewood, New Jersey. In August of that year, she won the Metropolitan Girls Golf Championship in Union, New Jersey.

== Golfing career ==
Probert won the Women's New Jersey Golf Association's 36-hole Stroke Play Championship for five consecutive years (1978-1982). She captured the club championship at Somerset Hills 25 times (in 6 different decades) and at Mountain Lake, Florida in Lake Wales, Florida 22 times. Probert also won the Garden State Women's Golf Championship 14 times. During her career, she represented the WMGA at the Griscom Cup 11 times. The Griscom is an annual competition played among women's golf associations in the New York, Philadelphia, and Massachusetts metropolitan areas. Probert also played in the U.S. Women's Amateur Championship six times (1996, 1999, 2003, 2004, 2005, 2006, and 2009.)

Probert served on the USGA's Junior Girls Championship Committee for 11 years and the women's committee for 9 years. She also served on the Women's Nominating Committee, and chaired the Women's Amateur and Senior Women's Amateur championships. In 1990, Probert co-chaired the Curtis Cup, an international competition between the U.S. and the United Kingdom, with her husband Edward Probert. She served as president of the Women's Metropolitan Golf Association (WMGA) from 1991 to 1992. In 2014, WMGA awarded Probert an honorary membership.

== Advocacy against domestic violence ==
Probert volunteered for the Jersey Battered Women's Service (JBWS) in Morristown, New Jersey. JBWS, a community organization, has provided services to women who face domestic violence or abuse since 1976. Probert served on their Board of Directors and co-chaired their campaigns. She also served as the chair of the Hope Classic golf tournament benefiting JBWS. In 1994, JBWS awarded Probert their first Distinguished Service Award.

== Family ==
On July 2, 1960, Probert married Edward Probert, a fellow amateur golfer. The couple has 3 children and 5 grandchildren, all of whom are avid golfers themselves.
