= Hannah Lyons Johnson =

American journalist

Hannah Lyons Bourne (1942–1999) was an author, journalist, and teacher. She wrote eight children's books under the pen name Hannah Lyons Johnson during the 1970s.

== Early life and education ==
Boune was born in Orange, New Jersey. She graduated from the Beard School (now Morristown-Beard School) in 1959. Bourne then earned her bachelor's degree at Northwestern University in Evanston, Illinois in 1963.

== Writing career ==
In 1971, Bourne authored her first book, Hello, Small Sparrow. It presented a collection of Haiku about nature. Bourne later authored a book on how to grow a vegetable garden, and children's cookbooks for soup, bread, and jam. She also penned a 1975 book called Picture the Past, 1900-1915, which discussed children's lives in the early 20th century. In 1977, Scholastics' Kids Review Kids Books discussed her book From Apple Seed to Applesauce. The National Science Teachers Association also named the book an Outstanding Science Book for Children. In 1974, Bourne authored a Halloween-themed book called From Seed to Jack-O'-Lantern. The New York Times Book Review described it as "a fascinating as well as strictly factual" book for children.

Bourne worked as a features writer and reporter for The Red Bank Register, a newspaper in Red Bank, New Jersey. She served as membership director of the American Littoral Society and as editor of their journal, Underwater Naturalist. Bourne also served on their board of directors. After moving to Cape Cod, Massachusetts, Bourne worked as a development officer and as an editor for the Woods Hole Research Center in Falmouth, Massachusetts. During her career, Bourne also taught at elementary schools in Illinois and New Jersey.

== Works ==
- Hello, Small Sparrow (1971)
- Let's Make Bread (1973)
- From Seed to Jack-O'-Lantern (1974)
- Let's Make Jam (1975)
- Picture the Past, 1900-1915 (1975)
- Let's Make Soup (1976)
- From Apple Seed to Applesauce (1977)
- From Seed to Salad (1978)
