= Harvey Ladew Williams Jr. =

American businessman (1900–1986)

Harvey Ladew Williams Jr. (1900–1986) was an American businessman who received induction into the National Order of the Legion of Honour in 1962 for 47 years of service to the French government. During his career, Williams served as president of several financial and industrial firms, including Air Investors Inc. (1928–1933), Fidelity International Corporation (1963–1965), and Philco International (1957–1962). He also served as president of the United States Council for International Business, the American affiliate of the International Chamber of Commerce, from 1973 to 1977. After his retirement, the council named him as their honorary president.

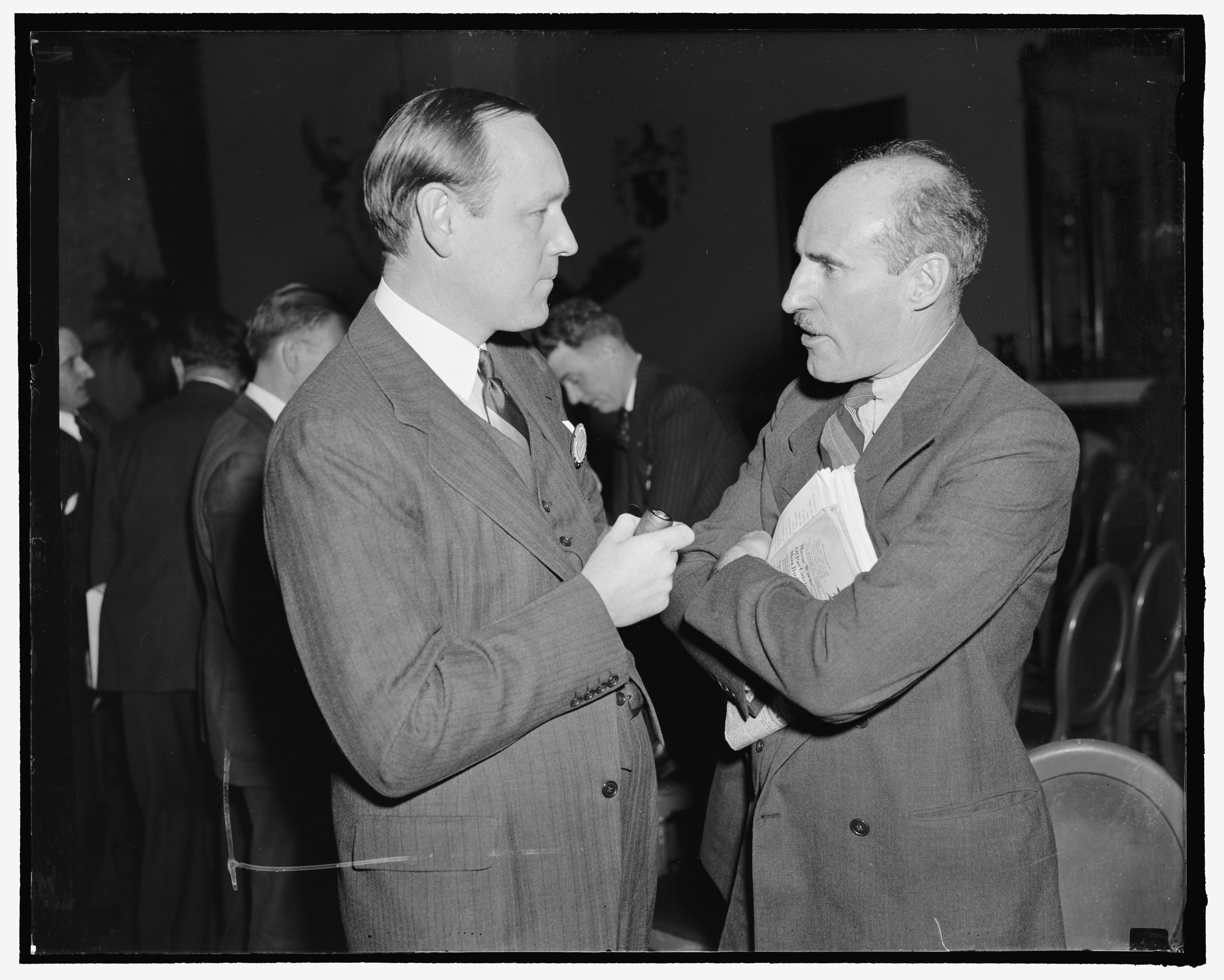

== Early life and education ==
Williams was born in Stamford, Connecticut on July 10, 1900. He graduated from the Morristown School (now Morristown-Beard School) in Morristown, New Jersey in 1916. Williams then received his bachelor's degree from Harvard University in Cambridge, Massachusetts in 1920. Two years later, he completed his master's of science degree in electrical engineering at the Massachusetts Institute of Technology (also in Cambridge, Massachusetts) in 1922.

== Executive leadership ==
During his career, Williams served as vice president of overseas operations for H.J. Heinz Company (1946–1953) and vice president and general manager of the international division of Avco Corporation (1953–1957). He chaired the Connecticut Aeronautical Development Commission from 1939 to 1943. Williams also worked as an international business consultant for 12 years (1966–1978).

== Ambulance service during World War I ==
Leaving for France in 1917, Williams served as an ambulance driver with the American Field Service from April to November of that year. He assisted the French Army's offenses in the Verdun region. During his time with the unit, they received France's Croix de Guerre for heroic actions during a bombing. In 1918, Williams joined the Ambulance Service of the American Red Cross. Serving from May 12 to December 18, he aided the Italian Army's offenses during the Battle of the Piave River.

== Family ==
Williams married Gertrude Elizabeth Hoxie in 1927. The couple had four children together: Harvey III, Eleanor, Sheila, and Hannah. After they divorced, he married Brenda Hedstrom Boocock in 1943.
