= Lindsay Barrett George =

American writer and illustrator

Lindsay Barrett George (born June 12, 1952) is an American illustrator and author of children's books. George has achieved her greatest notoriety for her Long Pond and Who's Been Here? series of books. Her books focus on the themes of nature and the lives of animals that inhabit it. The Library of Congress named George's book Box Turtle at Long Pond a Children's Book of the Year in 1989.

== Early life and education ==
George lives in the West Indies and grew up in New Jersey. She graduated from The Beard School in Orange, New Jersey (now Morristown-Beard School) in 1972. George presented the Lehman Lecture on "When Art & Words Marry: The Power of the Picture Book" at the school in 2013. After studying at the School of the Museum of Fine Arts in Boston, she received a bachelor's degree in fine arts from Manhattanville College in Purchase, New York in 1974. George completed her Master's of Fine Arts degree at the University of Wisconsin in Madison, Wisconsin in 1977 with a focus on drawing and printmaking from the Bachelor of Fine Arts she illustrate books, magazines, clothing, and handbags.

== Professional recognition ==
George's books have earned several national awards and honors. The National Science Teachers Association selected three of George's books (Beaver at Long Pond, Fishing at Long Pond (out of print), and Box Turtle at Long Pond) as Outstanding Science Trade Books for Children. The American Booksellers Association selected Fishing at Long Pong for their Pick of the Lists.

George has also received recognition for her books and illustrations from several Pennsylvania organizations. Pennsylvania's One Book, Every Young Child Project selected Inside Mouse, Outside Mouse to launch an early reading initiative in 2006. This book also received selection in the "Baker's Dozen Best Book for Family Literacy" from the Pennsylvania Center for the Book in 2004. In 1990, the Pennsylvania Library Association awarded George their Carolyn Field Award. She received the Free Library of Philadelphia – Drexel University Children's Literature Citation in 2006.

== Family ==
Lindsay George married William Trimpi George in 1984. They have two children named William and Cammy. William T. George died in 1999 and in 2013 Lindsay married journalist Thane Peterson.

== Works ==
William and Boomer (1987) (out of print)

Around the Pond: Who's Been Here? (1996)

In the Woods: Who's Been Here? (1998)

Around the World: Who's Been Here? (1999)

In the Snow: Who's Been Here? (1999)

My Bunny and Me (2001)

Inside Mouse, Outside Mouse (2004)

The Secret (2005)

In the Garden: Who's Been Here? (2006)

Alfred Digs (2008)

Maggie's Ball (2010)

That Pup! (2011) (out of print)
