= Austie Rollinson =

Austie Rollinson is the Sr. Director of Putter R&D for Scotty Cameron/Titleist at Acushnet Company, a position that he has held since January 2022. Previously, he was Chief Designer for the Odyssey putter brand at Callaway Golf Company. Rollinson worked at Callaway since graduating college in 1991, and as head designer for the Odyssey brand since 1997. He has designed custom putters for Phil Mickelson and Ernie Els. After the Professional Golf Association banned anchor putters in 2012, Rollinson led the team at Oddysey that designed an arm lock putter to lock against a golfer's forearm. His name appears on more than 300 patents related to the design of golf equipment.

== Early life and education ==
Rollinson gained his interest in golf from his father and grandfather. In 1986, Rollinson graduated from Morristown-Beard School in Morristown, New Jersey. During his senior year, his golf team won the New Jersey State Championship. After high school, Rollinson completed his bachelor's degree in physics at the University of Richmond in Richmond, Virginia in 1990. While studying science, he took elective courses in art and music. In 1990, Rollinson sent a letter to Ely Callaway, Jr., the founder of Callaway Golf, expressing an interest in working at the company. The letter led to an interview in which Callaway hired him as a golf club designer.

== Golf club design ==
In an interview with Links Magazine, Rollinson noted that the rules of golf make it easier to support design innovation for putters than for other golf clubs. He noted, "The rules of what you can do in designing a putter are so much more open than with woods and irons. There’s much more freedom in terms of the shape. It’s all over the map.” Rollinson also described in the interview that he designs putters to fit how golfers perceive contrasts. He stated, “The eye uses contrast to pick out edges of objects. ... The eye has a really good ability to pick out lines that are perpendicular and it wants to form a perfect right angle. It’s like when the eye sees a picture that’s crooked.” Thus, Rollinson designed lateral contrasts in putters to match this perceptive process.

Rollnson has a talent for rapidly designing putters for players on the PGA Tour, including when they face trouble with using one during a tournament. He noted in a profile on golf.com, "I always love the Friday afternoon fire drill." When Phil Mickelson showed an interest to try out the Sabertooth belly putter used by Keegan Bradley, Rollinson made him a new putter over a weekend.

== Family ==
Rollinson lives in Solana Beach, California with his wife Sally. They have three children.
