= Mary Travis Arny =

American writer, naturalist, and historian

Mary Wilson Travis Arny (1909–1997) was a writer, naturalist, historian, and educator. Arny served as a professor of biology at Montclair State College (now Montclair State University) in Montclair, New Jersey. She also authored several books on history, nature, and ecology, and she wrote articles for newspapers in New Jersey.

== Early life and education ==
Mary Wilson Travis was born to Thomas Travis, a clergyman, and Mary Travis, an artist, in Montclair, New Jersey on October 13, 1909. She graduated from the Beard School (now Morristown-Beard School) in Orange, New Jersey in 1928. She earned her undergraduate degree at the New Jersey College for Women (now part of Rutgers University) in New Brunswick, New Jersey in 1932. She completed her master's degree in biology at Rutgers University in 1934.

== Writing career ==
Arny published nine books between 1950 and 1972. Her second book, Seasoned with Salt, discusses her family life and the history of their house at 149 Watchung Avenue. Known as the Garrabrandt House, its first owners were Nicholas and Mary Garrabrandt. They built the stone house in Speertown (now the community of Upper Montclair) in 1723.

While authoring books, Arny also wrote articles for multiple local newspapers in the New York City metropolitan area. She penned articles for The Montclair Times', The Cedar Grove Times, and The Westchester News between 1940 and 1960. In 1966, the New Jersey Association of Teachers of English awarded her their Authors Award for Red Lion Rampant: An Informal History of Essex County, New Jersey. St. Edward's University in Austin, Texas awarded her their Coronet Award in 1964.

== Congressional hearing on trapping devices ==
In 1975, Arny testified before a U.S. Congressional hearing on painful trapping devices at the U.S. House of Representatives. The Subcommittee on Fisheries and Wildlife Conservation and the Environment of the Committee on Merchant Marine and Fisheries held the hearing.

== Works ==
- 1950: The Birds and Mammals of Montclair
- 1954: Seasoned with Salt
- 1956: Red Lion Rampant: An Informal History of Essex County, New Jersey
- 1963: A Goodly Heritage: Commemorative History of Montclair, New Jersey (with David Nelson Alloway)
- 1964: Commonsense Garden Guide
- 1965: Gardening Guidebook
- 1965: Practical Gardening Ideas
- 1972: Ecology: A Writer's Handbook
- 1972: Windows to Wonder: A Laboratory Guide

== Family ==
Arny married Robert Arny on June 25, 1938. They had three children together: Thomas, Mary, and Nancy.
