= Ernest Savignano =

American football player (1919–1994)

Ernest T. Savignano (January 13, 1919 – 1994) was an American football player who played quarterback, halfback, and kicker for the Brown Bears of Brown University. Savignano captained Brown's 1941 football team. During his football career at the school, he received selection to the All-New England team and honorable mention for the College Football All-America Team. Competing against Lafayette University in 1941, Savignano set a school record for longest punt in a game with a 65-yard kick. Brown University selected him for their 1940s All-Decade Team in 2003.

== Early life and education ==
Savignano was born on January 13, 1919. After attending Newton High School in Newton, Massachusetts, he graduated from Morristown School (now Morristown-Beard School) in Morristown, New Jersey in 1938. Savignano earned varsity letters in three sports at Newton High and five sports at Morristown School. Reaching all-state athletic honors, he captained Morristown School's football team that won the state championship. Morristown-Beard School inducted him into their Athletics Hall of Fame in 1986.

While attending Brown, Savignano served as class president and class marshall. He also served as vice president of the Brown Key Society, an honorary society, and he chaired the undergraduate athletic council. Participating in Brown's campaign to raise $30 million for the 1964 bicentennial, Savignano served on a committee to raise funds to build Meehan Auditorium. The athletic facility has served as Brown's hockey arena since 1962.

== All-around athlete at Brown ==
Known as "one of the most versatile athletes in Brown's history", Savignano played football, basketball, baseball, hockey, and track. Expanding his varsity athletic career beyond football, he played catcher for the varsity baseball team and guard for the varsity basketball team. Savignano earned eight varsity letters in the three sports during his time at Brown. In 1971, the school inducted him into their Hall of Fame.

== Military service during World War II ==
After graduating from Brown in 1942, Savignano joined the U.S. Marines Corps Reserve. Receiving a commission as a lieutenant and then a promotion to captain, he served in the Pacific Theatre of World War II. Savignano commanded the Marine squadron on board the U.S.S. Alaska during the Battle of Okinawa and the Battle of Iwo Jima. Following the war, he served at the headquarters of the Western U.S. Pacific Fleet in Qingdao, China.

== Coaching and industry careers ==
Returning to Brown, Savignano served as an assistant professor in the Naval Science Department. He coached the Bruin Cubs, the freshman football team, in 1947. Savignano then served as assistant athletic director at the school from 1948 to 1952. After leaving Brown, he joined the Narragansett Paper Company in Pawtucket, Rhode Island and served as their vice president. Savignano later served as president of the Black Hawk Paper Company in East Providence, Rhode Island.

== Ernest T. Savignano Scholarship Award ==
In 1994, Savignano's former classmates at Brown and his friends created the Ernest T. Savignano '42 Memorial Scholarship to honor his legacy. The Savignano Scholarship annually recognizes "academically qualified students who are exceptional leaders and are heavily involved in extracurricular activities, especially the sport of football". Therein, the scholarship reflects Savignano's achievements as a "man of all seasons" and "a man of leadership, integrity, ability, and warmth".
