= Tilghman (surname) =

Tilman family crest

Tilghman is a surname of English origin, and has its origins in Middle Ages England. The Tilghman family name according to evidence by historical findings is one of the oldest and most well researched surnames.

The family motto is: Spes Alit Agricolam (Latin) "Hope Nourishes the Farmer"

The first identified Tilghman was Johannes Tilghman, recorded in 1225 in Kent, England, who can be found in Stephen Fredrick Tillman's book "Spes Alit Agricolam." There in Kent the Tilghmans held a family at the Snodland Parish called Holloway Court.

However the origins of the Tilghman family go back beyond that. The Venerable Bede mentioned in Volume 1 of his writings that the Tilghman family settled in Kent, England, in 692. The oldest finding of the name Tilghman was in 692 and was that of a Monk Tilmon (Tilghman) [this was not however a surname nor likely to be handed on to heirs] who was with the Two Ewalds when they met their fate . Some who have researched the family believe the Tilghman family originated near the Rhine River as the French Von Till family and later migrated to England. Others who have researched the family however believe the Tilghmans came to England during the Anglo-Saxon invasions of the 4th century with the Jutes. Those who have done extensive research on the family also believe according to historical findings that the Tilghmans were thegns in medieval England and have traced their origins to that of William the Conqueror and Alfred the Great by way of Anna "Sanders" Tilghman circa 1572.

Many of the Tilghmans in the United States today are descended from Dr. Richard Tilghman, a surgeon who sailed from England with his wife in 1660 and settled the "Hermitage" Tilghman family home in Talbot County, Maryland.

During medieval times, literacy was not common, resulting in the many variations of the spelling, such as: Tilghman, Tylghman, Tilmon, Tillmon, Tilman, Tillman, etc.

People with the surname include:

- Amelia Tilghman (1856–1931), African-American pianist, teacher and activist who founded the first African-American journal devoted to music
- Benjamin Chew Tilghman (1821–1901), American soldier and inventor
- Bill Tilghman (1854–1924), lawman in the Old West period of the American frontier
- Charles F. Tilghman Jr. (1897–1985) American publisher
- George Tilghman (1896–1943), teacher and military officer
- Hettie B. Tilghman (1871–1933), African-American activist and suffragist
- James Tilghman (1716–1793), lawyer and public servant in colonial Maryland and Pennsylvania
- Kelly Tilghman (born 1969), golf announcer
- Lee Tilghman (born 1990), American former wellness influencer
- Lloyd Tilghman (1816–1863), Confederate general in the American Civil War
- Matthew Tilghman (1718–1790), American planter and Revolutionary leader
- Peregrine Tilghman (1741–1807), American politician and judge
- Richard Tilghman (1920–2017), Pennsylvania State Senator and Pennsylvania State Representative
- Sarah Tilghman Hughes (1896–1985), United States federal judge who swore in U.S. President Lyndon B. Johnson
- Shirley M. Tilghman (born 1946), Princeton University president and molecular biologist
- Tench Tilghman (1744–1786), American colonel in the American Revolutionary War, grandfather of Lloyd
- Todd Tilghman (born 1978), American pastor and singer, winner of season 18 of American The Voice
- William Tilghman (1756–1827), chief justice of the Pennsylvania Supreme Court
