= Sylvanie =

Sylvanie is a French feminine given name. Notable people with the name include:

- Jeanne Sylvanie Arnould-Plessy (1819–1897), French actress
- Sylvanie Burton, Dominican politician
- Sylvanie Williams (c. 1849–1921), American educator and clubwoman

== See also ==
- Sylviane
