= Tilghman =

Tilghman may refer to:

== People ==
- Tilghman (surname), a surname and a list of people with the surname
- Tilghman Howard (1797–1844), American politician
- Tilghman Tucker (1802–1859), American politician, governor of Mississippi from 1842 to 1844

== Other uses ==
- Tilghman Island, Maryland, United States, an island
- Tilghman Press in Oakland, California
- Paducah Tilghman High School, Paducah, Kentucky, United States
