= Vivian Osborne Marsh =

American activist and clubwoman

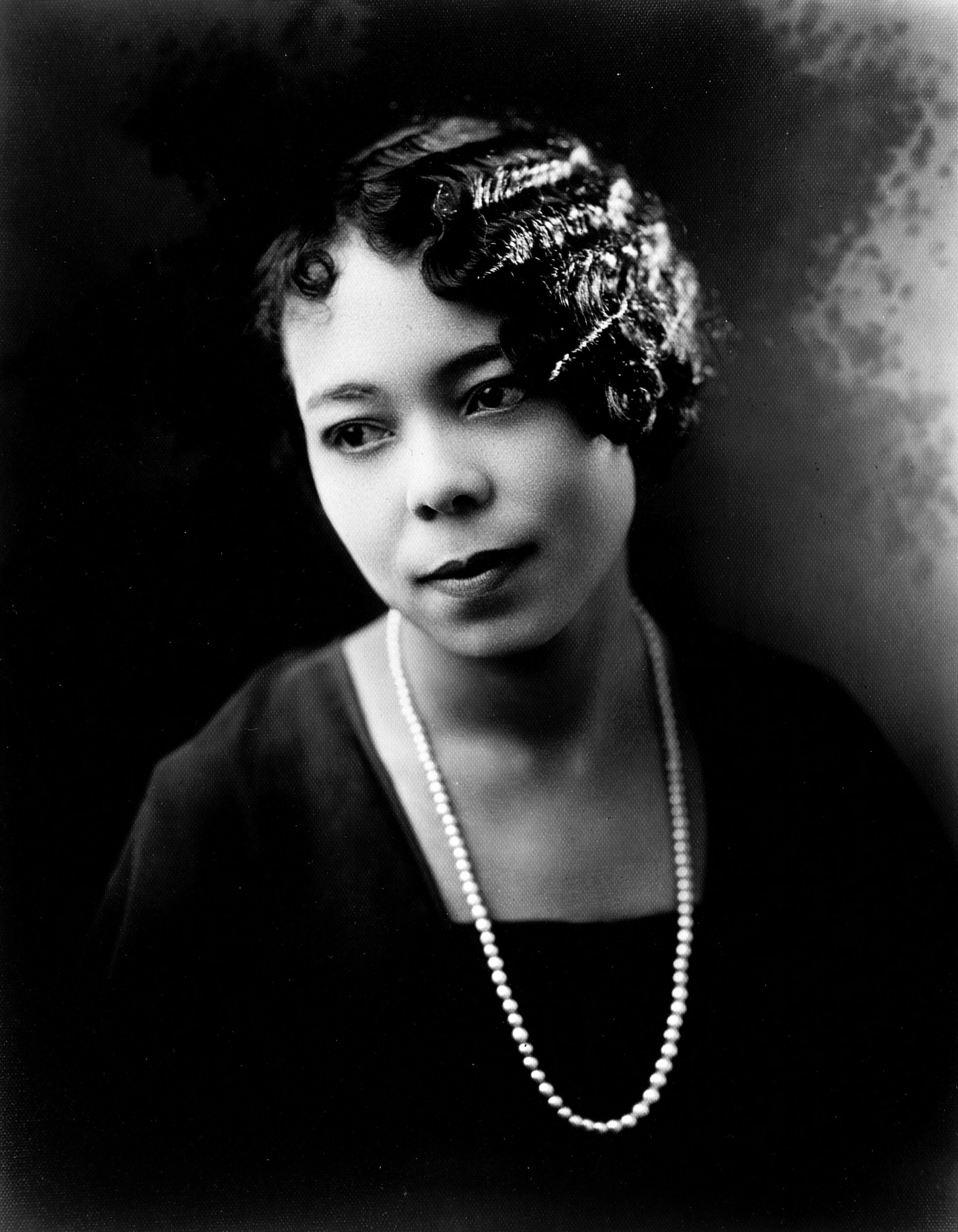
- Vivian Osborne Marsh, 1920s
- Born: Vivian Costroma Osborne; September 5, 1897; Houston, Texas
- Died: March 8, 1986 (aged 88); El Cerrito, California
- Occupation: clubwoman
- Known for: president of the California State Association of Colored Women, and national president of Delta Sigma Theta

Vivian Osborne Marsh (September 5, 1898 – March 8, 1986) was an American clubwoman based in San Francisco, California. She was president of the California State Association of Colored Women, and national president of Delta Sigma Theta.

== Early life ==
Vivian Costroma Osborne was born in Houston, Texas, the daughter of Benjamin J. Osborne and Alice Estes Osborne. She moved to California with her sister and their widowed mother in 1913. She graduated from Berkeley High School in 1914. She earned a bachelor's degree (1920) and a master's degree (1922) in anthropology at the University of California, Berkeley. She was the first Black woman to major in anthropology and first Black woman to receive a master's degree from Berkeley. in Her master's thesis was titled "Types and Distribution of Negro Folklore in America". In 1921, Marsh is credited with chartering the Kappa chapter of Delta Sigma Theta Sorority and later, the Berkeley Bay Area Alumnae Chapter. However, the Kappa chapter members were not initiated as members of Delta Sigma Theta sorority until September 1922. The women became members during an initiation performed by Delta organizer Ida Mae Myller. This makes the Kappa chapter of Delta Sigma Theta Sorority Inc,the second National Pan-Hellenic Council sorority chartered in California, after Alpha Kappa Alpha's Rho chapter. She later earned a teaching credential from UCLA, in 1932.

== Career ==
Marsh remained active with Delta Sigma Theta throughout her life, establishing the Berkeley Bay Area Alumnae Chapter in 1934, and was the sorority's seventh national president, from 1935 to 1939. During her time as president of Delta Sigma Theta, she organized a traveling library for rural Georgia, and Teen Lift, a program to improve access to concerts, operas, and plays for black teenagers. She also went to Washington, D.C. to represent the sorority in the work for anti-lynching legislation. Marsh was an active member and leader of several other fraternal associations, including Heroines of Jericho, the Order of Calanthe, and Prince Hall Order of the Eastern Star.

Marsh was also active with the National Association of Colored Women's Clubs, beginning as a member of the Phillis Wheatley Club in college. She was a member of the YWCA and the Berkeley Women's Civic Club, and was director of the Oakland junior branch of the NAACP from 1928 to 1929. She supervised the Division on Negro Affairs of California's National Youth Administration during the Depression. She was elected president of the California State Association of Colored Women in 1941. She was elected vice-president of the National Council of Negro Women in 1945.

During World War II, she christened a Navy cargo ship, the S. S. Ocean Telegraph, in Oakland in 1944. She was a leader in the Women's Ambulance and Defense Corps of America, a civilian readiness organization.

Marsh took part in Republican Party politics in California. She was a member of the State Republican Legislative Council, and of the Alameda County Republican Central Committee. In 1956 she was vice president of the Alameda County Republican League. She was appointed to the Planning Commission in the city of Berkeley, and chaired the Board of Adjustments. In 1959 and 1965 she ran for a seat on the City Council, but lost. The Mayor of Berkeley declared February 21, 1980 as "Vivian Osborne Marsh Day".

== Personal life ==
Vivian Osborne married a fellow Texan, World War I veteran Leon F. Marsh, in 1921. They raised two sons, Roy Curtin Osborne and Leon F. Marsh Jr.; Leon Jr., the first black firefighter in Berkeley, died in 1956. She was widowed when Leon Sr. died in 1968, and she died on March 8, 1986, aged 87 years, at a nursing home in El Cerrito, California, following a stroke and was survived by 5 grandchildren and 12 great-grandchildren. Canadian football player Dante Marsh is her great-grandson.
