= Mary Burnett Talbert =

American activist (1866–1923)

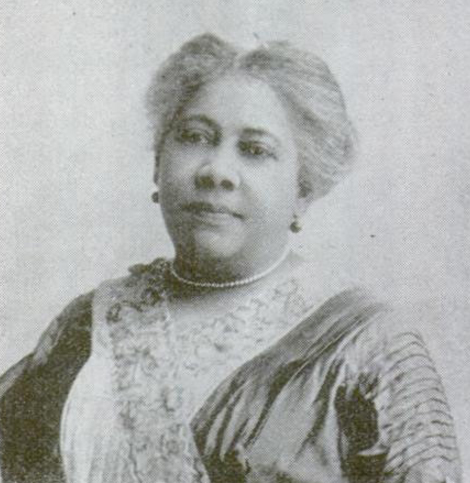
- Born: September 17, 1866; Oberlin, Ohio, U.S.
- Died: October 15, 1923 (aged 57)
- Resting place: Forest Lawn Cemetery, Buffalo, New York
- Education: Oberlin College
- Occupations: Social activist, Suffragist
- Spouse: William H. Talbert (m. 1891)

Mary Burnett Talbert (born Mary Morris Burnett; September 17, 1866 – October 15, 1923) was an American orator, activist, suffragist and reformer. In 2005, Talbert was inducted into the National Women's Hall of Fame.

== Early life and education ==
Mary Morris Burnett was born in Oberlin, Ohio in 1866. As the only African American woman in her graduating class from Oberlin College in 1886, Burnett earned a Bachelor of Arts degree. She entered the field of education first as a teacher in 1886 at Bethel University in Little Rock, then as an assistant principal of the Union High School in Little Rock in 1887, the highest position held by an African American woman in the state. In 1891, she married William H. Talbert and moved to Buffalo, New York, where she joined Buffalo's historic Michigan Avenue Baptist Church.

Talbert earned a higher education degree when a college education was controversial and rare for women and people of color. When women's organizations were segregated by race, Talbert was an advocate of women of all colors working together to advance their causes.

== Activism ==
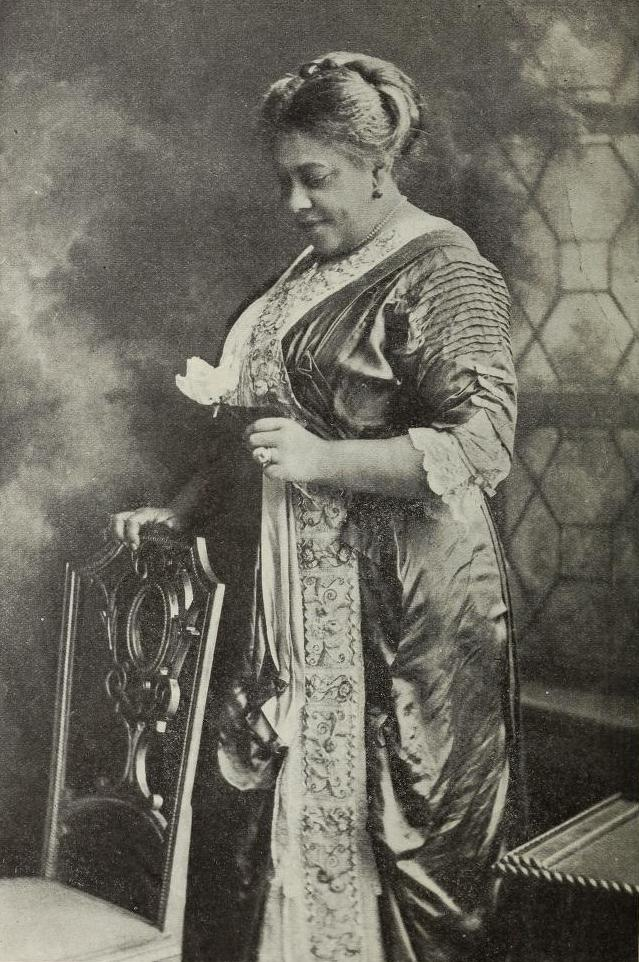
Mary Talbert, President of the National Association of Colored Women. Courtesy of The Champion Magazine, 1916

Described by her peers as "the best-known colored woman in the United States," Talbert used her education to take part in anti-lynching and anti-racism work, alongside supporting women's suffrage. In 1915, she spoke at the "Votes for Women: A Symposium by Leading Thinkers of Colored Women" in Washington, D.C. During her national and international lecture tours, Talbert spoke to audiences about oppressive conditions in African American communities and the need for legislation to address these conditions.

As a founder of the Niagara Movement, Talbert helped to launch organized civil rights activism in America. The Niagara Movement was radical enough in its brief life to both spawn and absorb controversy within the black community and prepared the way for its successor, the National Association for the Advancement of Colored People (NAACP). Central to the efforts of both organizations, Mary Talbert helped set the stage for the civil rights gains of the 1950s and the 1960s.

Talbert's long leadership of women's clubs helped develop black female organizations and leaders in New York and the United States. She served as the President for the National Association of Colored Women's Clubs for four years (1916–1920), succeeding Margaret Murray Washington.

Talbert saved the Frederick Douglass home in Anacostia, D.C. after other preservation efforts had failed. Buffalo's 150-year-old Michigan Avenue Baptist Church, to which the Talbert family belonged, has been named to the United States National Register of Historic Places. Many prominent African Americans worshiped or spoke there. The church also had a landmark role in abolitionist activities. In 1998, a marker honoring Talbert, who served as the church's treasurer, was installed in front of the Church by the New York State Governor's Commission Honoring the Achievements of Women.

== Death and legacy ==
Talbert died on October 15, 1923, and is buried in Forest Lawn Cemetery. A small collection of Talbert family papers, concerned mostly with property and estate matters, survives in the Research Library of the Buffalo History Museum. In October 2005, Talbert was inducted into the National Women's Hall of Fame in Seneca Falls, New York. She has several clubs and buildings named after her, including:

- National Association of Colored Women (NACW) branches named after her in Buffalo, New York; Detroit, Michigan; Gary, Indiana; and New Haven, Connecticut;
- City Federation of Women's Clubs named after her in Florida and Texas;
- Talbert Hall at the University at Buffalo;
- Talbert Mall Housing Development (later renamed Frederick Douglass Towers), Buffalo, New York; and
- Mary B. Talbert Hospital (merged with Booth Memorial Hospital, later taken over by Cleveland Metropolitan Hospital), Cleveland, Ohio.
- One three statues honoring pioneering women from Western New York placed at Old Erie County Hall, 92 Franklin Street, Buffalo.

== Accomplishments ==
- Established the Christian Culture Congress, a literary society and forum in 1901, which brought black leaders such as W. E. B. Du Bois and Mary Church Terrell to Buffalo to speak at the Michigan Avenue Baptist Church.
- Protested the exclusion of blacks from the 1901 Pan-American Exposition Planning Commission, which resulted in the inclusion of a Negro Exhibit on cultural and economic achievements of African Americans. During the same year, Talbert lectured at the Biennial Conference of the National Association of Colored Women's Clubs (NACWC) in Buffalo as was instrumental in local arrangements.
- Joined the Phyllis Wheatley Club, the first club in Buffalo to affiliate with the NACWC, and eventually served as the club's president.
- Co-organized the Niagara Movement, a precursor to the National Association for the Advancement of Colored People (NAACP) and the beginning of 20th century American civil rights activism.
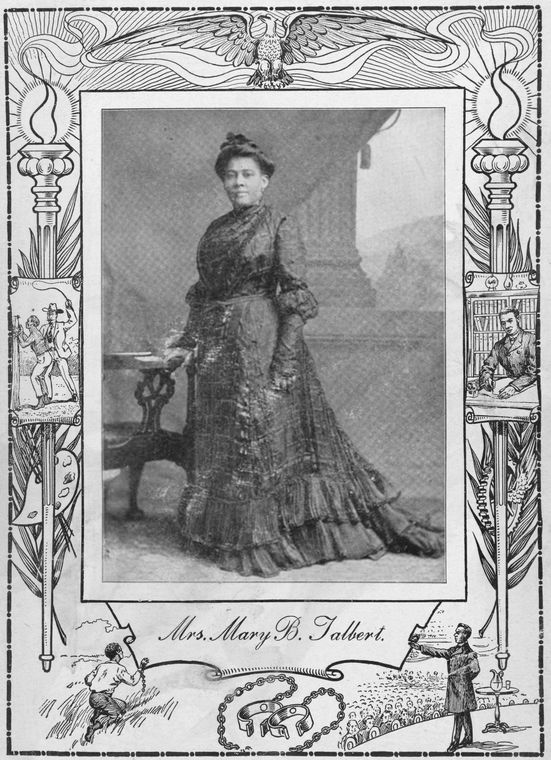
- Mary B. Talbert, ca. 1902
  Co-founded Buffalo's first chapter of the NAACP in 1910, as well as NAACP chapters in Texas and Louisiana; elected board member and vice president of the NAACP; served as National Director of the NAACP Anti-Lynching Campaign in 1921; eighth recipient and the first woman to be awarded the highest honor by the NAACP, the Spingarn Medal.
- Served as a YMCA secretary in Romagne, France during World War I; offered classes to African-American soldiers; sold thousands of dollars of Liberty Bonds as a traveling speaker; served on the Women's Committee of National Defense.
- Appointed to the Women's Committee on International Relations, which was responsible for selecting female nominees for positions in the League of Nations.
- Joined the Empire State Federation of Colored Women as a Charter Member and eventually served as the Federation's Parliamentarian and President.
- Elected President (1916–1920) of the NACWC; represented the NACWC as the first African American delegate to the International Council of Women (ICW) at their 5th congress in Norway in 1920
- Restored the Frederick Douglass home in Anacostia, D.C., and was elected president-for-life of the Frederick Douglass Memorial and Historical Association
- Lectured in 11 European nations on the conditions of African Americans in the United States, earning extensive press coverage.
- Cofounded the International Council of Women of the Darker Races in Washington, D.C., in 1922.
- First Worthy Matron of Naomi Chapter No.10 Prince Hall Order Eastern Star, subordinate chapter of Eureka Grand Chapter Prince Hall Order Eastern Star Inc. State of NY.

== Bibliography ==
- Axinn, J., & Stern, M. J. (2005). Social Welfare: A History of the American Response to Need (6 ed.). Boston: Pearson Education, Inc.
- Brown, Nikki L.M. Private Politics and Public Voices: Black Women's Activism from World War I to the New Deal. Bloomington, IN: Indiana University Press, c2006. (The work of Talbert and the National Association of Colored Women is featured throughout.)
- Brown, Hallie Q. "Homespun Heroines and Other Women of Distinction." Xenia, OH: Aldine Publishing Co., 1926, pp. 217–219
- Brown, M. J. (2000). Eradicating this Evil: Women in the American Anti-Lynching Movement, 1892-1940. New York: Routledge.
- Davis, Marianna W. "Contributions of Black Women to America." Columbia, SC: Kenday, 1982
- Eberle, Scott. "Second Looks: A Pictorial History of Buffalo and Erie County." Norfolk, VA: Donning Co., c1987, p. 99
- Eggenberger, David, ed. "Encyclopedia of World Biography, Twentieth Century Supplement, v.15. Palatine, IL: Jack Heraty & Associates, Inc., c1987, pp. 396-399
- Hardy, Gayle. "American Women Civil Rights Activists." Jefferson, NC: McFarland & Co., c1993, pp. 370–375.
- Heck, James R. "Contributions of Blacks in Western New York at the Turn of the Century." Buffalo, NY: Buffalo Public Schools, c1987, pp. 81–84
- Logan, Rayford, ed. "Dictionary of American Negro Biography." New York: W.W. Norton & Co., c1982, pp. 576–577
- Nahal, Anita, and Lopez D. Matthews Jr.,"African American Women and the Niagara Movement, 1905-1909," Afro-Americans in New York Life and History, Vol.32, No.2, July 2008, http://www.thefreelibrary.com/African+American+women+and+the+Niagara+Movement%2c+1905-1909.-a0182027493
- Ovington, M. W. (1920, December 17). Talbert Timeline, from African American History of Western New York: http://www.math.buffalo.edu/~sww/0history/hwny-talbert.html#phylis%20wheatley%20club
- "Profiles of Negro Womanhood," v.1. Yonkers, NY: Educational Heritage, 1964–6, p. 317
- "Remembering a Remarkable Woman." Buffalo News, 1 October 1998, p. B-4 (photograph with caption)
- The New York Public Library by Hallie Q. Brown. (1999). Mary Burnett Talbert, from Digital Schomburg African American Women Writers of the 19th Century: http://digilib.nypl.org/dynaweb/digs/wwm97253/@Generic__BookTextView/4179;pt=4040
- Talbert, Mary. "What Role is the Educated Negro Woman to Play in the Uplifting of her Race?" in Culp, Daniel Wallace, ed. Twentieth Century Negro Literature. Toronto, Canada; Naperville, IL; Atlanta, GA: J. L. Nichols & Co., 1902.
- Talbert, M. B. (1922, October 21). Letter from Mary B. Talbert to Mary White Ovington. NAACP Papers, The Anti-Lynching Campaign 1912–1955, Part 7: http://womhist.alexanderstreet.com/lynch/doc18.htm
- Talbert, Mary. "Women and Colored Women." The Crisis, August 1915, p. 184
- Woloch, N., & Johnson, P. E. (2009). originally from Microsoft Encarta Online Encyclopedia
- Williams, Lillian Serece. "Mary Morris Burnett Talbert," in Hine, Darlene Clark, ed. "Black Women in America: An Historical Encyclopedia." Brooklyn, NY: Carlson Publications, c1993, pp. 1137–1139
- Williams, Lillian Serece. Strangers in the Land of Paradise: The Creation of an African-American Community, Buffalo, New York, 1900-1940. Bloomington, IN: Indiana University Press, c1999 (Talbert and family are mentioned throughout)
