= Fannie Emanuel =

American doctor and civic leader

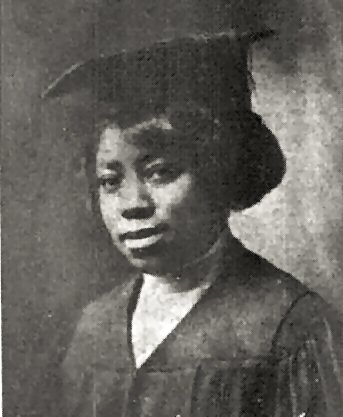
Dr. Fannie Emanuel (1915)

Dr. Fannie Hagen Emanuel (July 31, 1871 – March 31, 1934) was an American medical doctor and civic leader active in Chicago over the early decades of the twentieth century. In 1908 she founded the Emanuel Settlement House in Chicago.

== Early life ==
Fannie Hagan was born and raised in Cincinnati, Ohio, where she graduated with high marks from Gaines High School. She lived in New York City for a short time before moving to Chicago, Illinois where she married William Emanuel on February 28, 1888 at Bethel Church. proprietor of the Professor William Emanuel Scientific Chiropody Company (Chiropody]. Her husband was born in Macon, Georgia, on December 1, 1862, and had relocated to Chicago from New York in 1887.

== Career ==
After they married, Emanuel assisted her husband by serving as the firm's treasurer. The Emanuel chiropody clinic remained opened in the Chicago Loop for over thirty-five years.

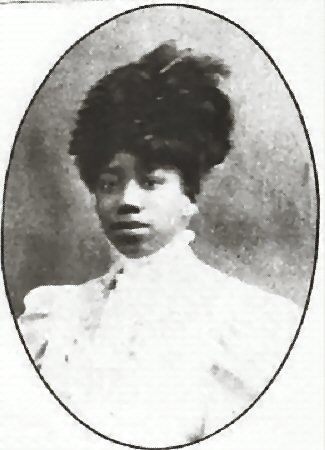
Dr. Fannie Emanuel c. 1907

In 1908 Emanuel attended classes in social sciences at the Graham Taylor School of Civics and Philanthropy in Chicago. Later that year she established the Emanuel House, a settlement house on Armour Avenue in Chicago. In her mission statement Emanuel's stated goal was "to inspire higher ideals of manhood and womanhood, to purify the social condition, and to encourage thrift and neighborhood pride, and good citizenship." Emanuel House maintained a kindergarten and offered cooking and sewing classes, boys' and girls' club, free dental clinic, employment bureau and domestic science class for adults. Though located in a predominantly black neighborhood known as the Black Belt, her settlement house was available to all races. The Emanuel Settlement House closed in 1912.

Emanuel attended the Jenner Medical College of Medicine and, beginning in 1911, the Chicago Hospital College of Medicine (now Chicago Medical School at Rosalind Franklin University) where she graduated with her medical degree in 1915, not long after becoming a grandmother. She eventually set up her private practice with offices in the Roosevelt State Bank Building at Grand Boulevard and 35th Street, Chicago.

Emanuel served on the board of directors of the Phyllis Wheatley Club, an organization tasked with helping improve the lot of African-American women and was active with such organizations as the YWCA, Ida B. Wells Women's Club, Women’s Aid of Old Folks Home, Elizabeth Chapter, Prince Hall Order of the Eastern Star, Warden Temple, Improved Benevolent and Protective Order of Elks of the World, Order of Calanthe, and the Delta Sigma Theta sorority.

The Emanuels had four children: a daughter Juanita, and sons William, Floyd and McKinley. Into the 1920s the family maintained a summer residence in Idlewild, Michigan.

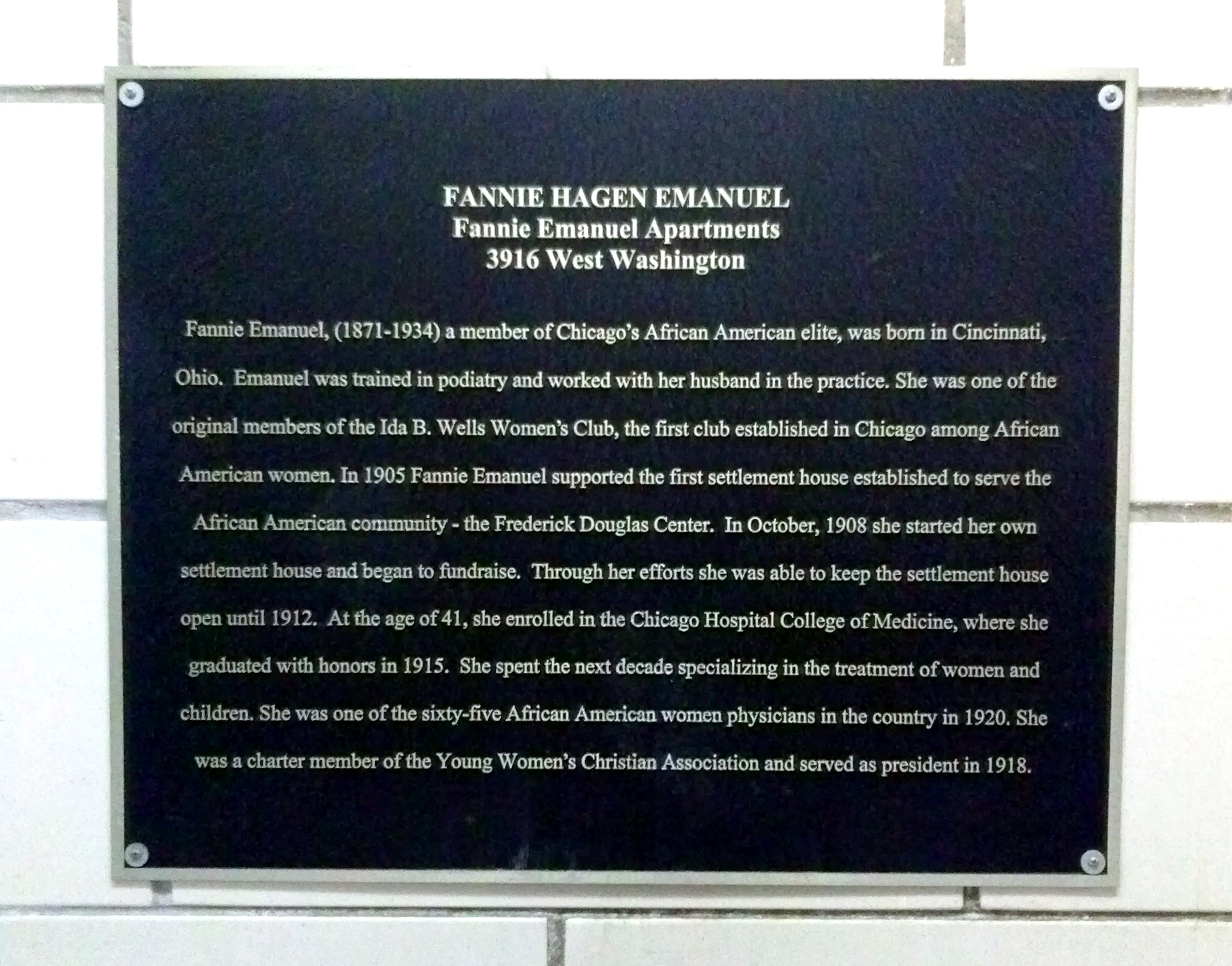
Dedication plaque in the lobby of the Chicago Housing Authority's Fannie Emanuel Apartments, 3916 West Washington Street, Chicago

The Chicago Housing Authority's Fannie Emanuel Apartments, a 20-story affordable senior apartment complex in Chicago's West Garfield Park neighborhood, are named in Dr. Emanuel's honor.
