= Fannie Franklin Wall =

Clubwoman, civic leader, children's home founder (c. 1860–1944)

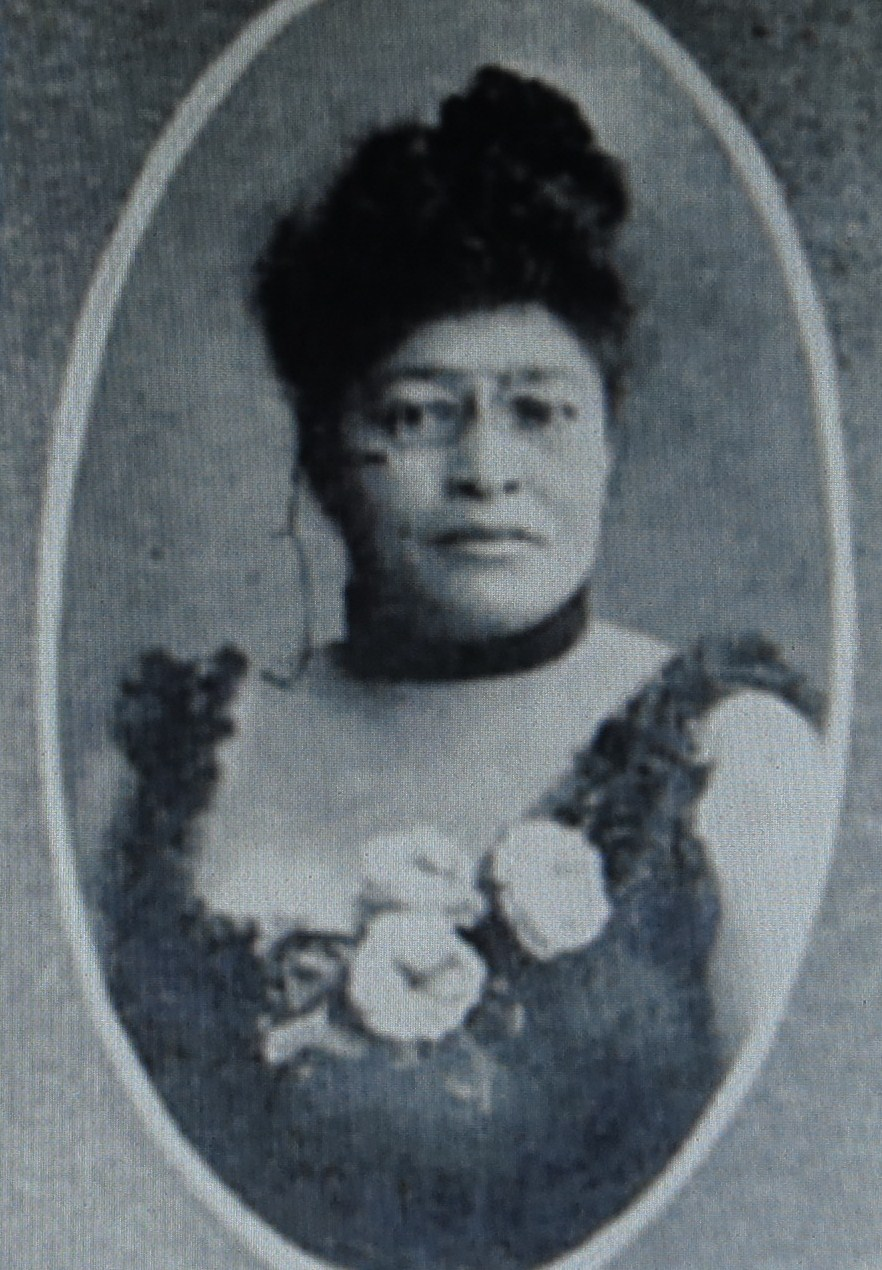
- Born: Fannie Franklin c. 1860; Gallatin, Tennessee
- Died: 1944; Oakland, California
- Resting place: San Francisco National Cemetery
- Monuments: Fannie Wall Head Start
- Occupations: Clubwoman, civic leader, community activist, children's home founder
- Employer(s): Fannie Wall Children's Home and Day Nursery
- Organization(s): National Association for the Advancement of Colored People; Urban League; California State Federation of Colored Women's Clubs; National Association of Colored Women; First African Methodist Church
- Spouse: Archy H. Wall
- Children: 3: Lillian, Florence, Clifton
- Relatives: Archie Williams (grandson)

Fannie Franklin Wall (c. 1860–1944) was an American clubwoman, civic leader, community activist, and children's home founder.

== Early life ==
Fannie Franklin was born in about 1860 in Gallatin, Tennessee. Little is known about her early life and education, but she married Archy H. Wall, as US Army staff sergeant. Archy Wall was a musician, and part of the all-black 24th Infantry. The couple had three children: two daughters, Lillian and Florence, and a son, Clifton. The family moved from Tennessee to California after Archy Wall was transferred from New Mexico to San Francisco during the Spanish–American War, settling in Oakland after his retirement from the army in 1900. There, Fannie Wall became a prominent community activist, taking part in several organizations promoting African American economic empowerment and antiracism.

== Civic and social activities ==
Fannie Franklin Wall was active in the National Association of Colored Women (NACW), and a longtime President of the California Federation of Colored Women's Clubs. The National Association of Colored Women, founded in 1896, was the first national organization of black women. Its motto was 'Lifting As We Climb', and it emphasised activism and service, pursuing community improvement, social justice, and civil rights. Wall helped to organize the NACW's Fifteenth Biennial Session in 1926, which took place 30 July - 6 August at Oakland's Civic Auditorium. She became a close friend and colleague of the association's founder Mary McLeod Bethune, who stayed at the Walls' home during the conference.

Wall was also actively involved in the Oakland National Association for the Advancement of Colored People (NAACP), the Urban League, and in Oakland's First African Methodist Church. The First African Methodist Church was at the heart of the black community, and frequented by many figures active in Oakland's social and civic affairs. Wall was also involved in the King's Daughters Circle, the Sisters of the Mysterious Ten, and the Art and Industrial Club of Oakland, of which she was president. Under Wall's presidency, the Art and Industrial Club became members of the Child Welfare League, and were 'the first club to cooperate in the establishment of the Fannie Wall Children's Home and Day Nursery, contributing $50.00.'

Wall became well known as a community activist, noted for, on multiple occasions refusing to leave the office of Oakland mayor John L. Davies until her concerns were addressed. She was a promoter not just of African American rights and empowerment, but also of improved relations between black and white residents of Oakland.

== Fannie Wall Children's Home ==
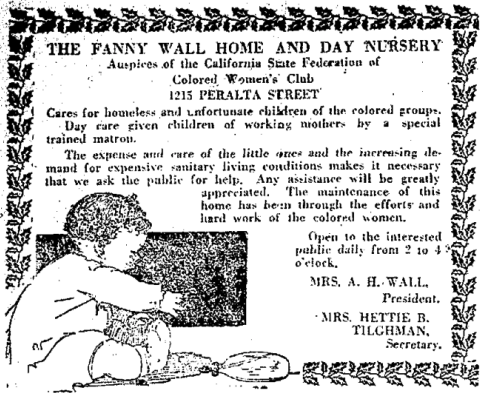
Advertisement for the Fannie Wall Children's Home in the Oakland Tribune, 1921

Wall was 'the motivating spirit' behind the creation of the home for black children which later became the Fannie Wall Children's Home and Day Nursery. Plans to establish the Home had begun in 1914 with Wall and Hettie Tilghman, respectively President and Financial Secretary of the Northern Federation of California Colored Women's Clubs. They sought specifically to support black working mothers, care for orphaned black children, and to provide services for African Americans then severely lacking. The Fannie Wall Children's Home and Day Nursery opened in 1918 at 1215 Peralta Street in West Oakland, aiming to 'care for homeless, dependent, neglected children from broken homes, and to provide day care for children of working parents'.

Theirs was the first facility in Northern California to provide housing, boarding, and day care for black orphans, and was for many decades the only Bay Area day care provider open to African American children. It created a family environment for children aged four-fourteen, for both day-care and live-in provision, accepting referrals from nearby counties, in addition to children from Oakland itself. Its staff and volunteers included educators, medical professionals, dieticians, recreation leaders, and social workers.

The Fannie Wall Children's Home received funding from the Oakland Community Chest, a bequest from Theodore Dreiser, and from a former board member, Josephine Hutton. In addition to fundraising activities, the Home's funds were supported by various individuals and organizations.

In 1928, the Children's Home moved to a new location at 815 Linden Street, a grand house built in the 1880s. The Northern Federation of Colored Women's Clubs operated the Fannie Wall Children's Home until 1941, when the home was incorporated as an independent organization. It moved again in 1964, reopening at 647 55th Street in 1967. Today it is the Fannie Wall Head Start, a Pre-K Program.

Responding to the racial exclusivity of downtown Oakland's YWCA, Wall helped to establish the Linden Street YWCA, open to African Americans, close to the children's home.

== Later years ==
Archy Wall died on 11 May 1931. In 1936, Wall's grandson Archie F. Williams won an olympic gold medal in Berlin. The Oakland Tribune, reporting on the celebration of his family back home, described Wall, at 75, as 'still active in the affairs of the Fannie Wall Home for Children, which she founded.'

Fannie Franklin Wall died aged 84 on 14 April 1944, in her home at 6114 Telegraph Avenue in North Oakland, which she left to her daughters. She was buried alongside her husband in the San Francisco National Cemetery.
