= John Angelo Lester =

American physician (1858–1934)

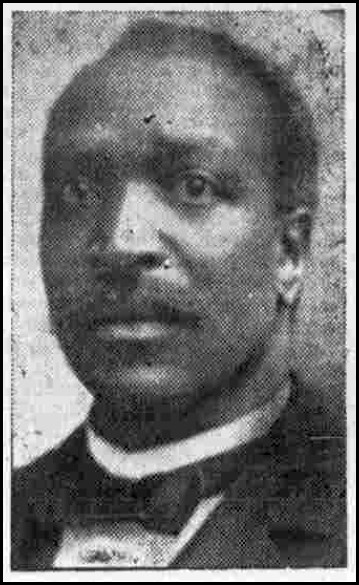
- Born: October 29, 1858; Lebanon, Tennessee, U.S.
- Died: September 27, 1934 (aged 75); Nashville, Tennessee, U.S.
- Education: Meharry Medical College
- Scientific career
- Fields: Medical education

John Angelo Lester (1858 – 1934) was an American educator, physician and administrator in Nashville, Tennessee between 1895 and 1934. He was a professor of physiology at Meharry Medical College and was named Professor Emeritus in 1930. Lester served as an executive officer in the National Medical Association and various state and regional medical associations throughout Tennessee, a mecca for African-American physicians since Reconstruction.

== Personal life ==
John Angelo Lester was born in Lebanon, Tennessee on October 29, 1858, to Austin Lester of Virginia and Candace Donnell of Tennessee. In 1902, Lester married Rebecca H. Taylor of Tennessee. Rebecca's occupation was chiropodist and hair care entrepreneur. Rebecca birthed four children, who all died by 1900.

== Education ==
John Angelo Lester began his secondary training in the college prep department at Fisk University in 1883. He participated outside of the classroom at Fisk as proofreader of the Fisk Herald, a school newspaper edited by soon to be graduate W. E. B. Du Bois. Among a select few, he was also involved in Fisk's effort to build the first gymnasium among Historically Black colleges and universities by soliciting donations throughout the Nashville community. Lester spent his sophomore summer teaching in a rural county school in Tiptonville, Tennessee.

After graduating in 1890, Lester trained with clergy and laymen in preparation for a short stint as the secretary for the Fisk University YMCA during the 1890-1 term.

Lester then decided to continue in the teaching profession and accepted an instructor's position and the two-year sojourn to the Deep South at Alcorn A&M College in Mississippi to teach anatomy, botany and zoology. At Alcorn, Lester served as a tutor and secretary of the Boarding Hall.

At this point in his academic career, Lester had earned the recognition of other notable pioneers in the field of Negro medical education. Miles Vandahurst Lynk, publisher of the Medical and Surgical Observer, the first Negro-run medical journal, highlighted Lester's admission into Meharry Medical Department at Central Tennessee College in Nashville. In 1895, he graduated and earned medical board certification in Tennessee.

== Meharry Medical College ==
Lester's professional life illustrated a commitment to the Meharry Medical College. In 1896, Lester began teaching physiology in the Medical and later, the Dental departments of Meharry. By this time, Meharry had graduated two hundred seventy-four students, predominantly Negroes in its nineteen-year existence and was the leading Negro medical college in the South. Lester used F. G. Lemercier scientific illustrations and Auzoux anatomical models to train his first and second year students. They depended on the thorough recitations of "the exact [Professor] Lester" to give them ample book-knowledge on their subjects, within their burdened learning environment. Meharry students' burden was being denied internship opportunities at Nashville area hospitals, an essential component of medical education, due to racial discrimination. This began to change in 1900 when Meharry Professor Dr. R. F. Boyd opened the 24-bed Mercy Hospital to serve the Nashville community, including Negroes and upcoming Negro physicians and nurses.

Lester was an advocate for the elevated admissions requirements, curriculum improvement, facilities development and fundraising efforts that earned Meharry Medical College its accreditation and reputation throughout his tenure. During this period of institutionalization of the medical education field, many Negro medical schools lost support due to their inability to maintain standards set by the Flexner Report, a national survey created by the Carnegie Foundation and the American Medical Association. Lester's educational philosophy is evidenced by his scholarly papers delivered at annual National Medical Association conferences. Lester delivered a paper at the 1915 Chicago meeting titled "The Use and Abuse of Laboratory Findings" and at the 1917 Philadelphia meeting titled "The Evolution of the Standard of Medical Education".

Lester was also among the medical staff conducting safe, free surgical clinics held at Meharry. These annual clinics allowed hundreds of the needy and infirmed to receive essential medical attention from experienced Negro surgeons, among them, Dr. Daniel Hale Williams of Chicago and nurse superintendent Dr. Josie E. Wells of Nashville. Students also practiced medicine and hygiene among the regional exodus of ailing patients. In 1909, Lester and his colleagues performed more than twenty surgeries including appendectomies, hysterectomies, orchidectomies and others. Patients were placed under convalescent care at Mercy Hospital and Wilson Infirmary, founded by Dr. J. T. Wilson.

Lester served on the Executive Committee of the Meharry Alumni Association from 1898 and beyond. The alumni was utilized as a funding source and as a means to strengthen professional cohesion among Negro medical practitioners. Lester traveled the country, taking particular focus on gathering Meharryites and soliciting donations for the building of the Hubbard Hospital in 1915 and the Meharry Endowment Fund in 1917.

Lester became the dean of the Medical Department in 1915 and was awarded the post of Professor Emeritus after serving Meharry for fifteen more years in that capacity. Several of Meharry's teaching faculties also held administrative positions. Lester oversaw every student's entry into Meharry as registrar for many years.

== National Medical Association ==
Racial segregation prevented Negro doctors' entry into Whites-only medical societies. In the 1890s the small number of Negro physicians began to organize as a national body. J. A. Lester was not present at the first meeting of Negro doctors during the Cotton States and International Exposition in Atlanta, to form the American Medical Association of Colored Physicians and Surgeons (later known as National Medical Association). However, he was present in 1897, during the Tennessee Centennial and International Exposition at the group's subsequent meeting which galvanized support for the fledgling Association among a broader group including Meharry graduates. He delivered a paper titled "Crown and Bridge Work".

In 1903, a group of thirty-four Negro practitioners founded the Negro Medical Congress of Tennessee (later known as the Volunteer State Medical Association) and gained national press from a New York Times article. Held in Nashville in conjunction with Booker T. Washington's National Negro Business League's annual meeting, the Association's activities were witnessed by Washington, Nashville Mayor J. M. Head and hundreds of others. At this meeting, Lester was elected the Negro Medical Congress' first president.

Yearly, Lester traveled throughout the country to the annual meetings of various state medical societies. J. A. Lester served in Executive capacities in the Volunteer State Medical, Pharmaceutical and Dental Association, Rock City Academy of Medicine, Tri-State Medical, Dental, and Pharmaceutical Association of Mississippi, Tennessee and Arkansas and Tennessee National Medical Association.

As a member of these professional organizations, Lester was able to directly serve the public and combat tuberculosis, a steady health threat throughout the nation. Medical clinics and informational meetings were conducted in churches and the small number of Negro hospitals in the South. In 1913, Lester, with favorable commentary, urged a fair-sized audience at Pleasant Green Baptist Church to patronize the new Davidson County Tuberculosis Hospital. The year before, Lester and fourteen Rock City Academy physicians were invited by the Mayor and County Superintendent of Health to inspect the new County Tuberculosis Hospital. Ironically, those invited Negro physicians would remain restricted from practicing in the public segregated hospital they were expected to advocate for.

== Public life ==
Lester and Rebecca maintained an active social life in Nashville. His practice was located on Cedar Street which placed him in the heart of Nashville's Negro commercial district. He was surrounded by the activities of the Boyd Building, home to numerous fraternal groups, the People's Savings Bank and many other businesses. Lester helped to organize the Tennessee Colored Fair Association, which put on an annual outdoor fair in Greenwood Park, a private, Negro-owned recreational park. Without children of their own during Christmastime, the Lesters invited a small group of orphans annually into their home for entertaining and gift-giving.

Lester was faithful to the Methodist Episcopal denomination throughout his entire life. As a youngster, he was guided by Rev. B. B. Manson of the Methodist Episcopal Church in Lebanon, TN. In Nashville, he worshiped under the Colored Methodist Episcopal(CME) church and was an active parishioner. CME raised significant resources for its school projects and in 1917, Lester was appointed to the Sunday School Board to oversee the educational endeavors of the Nashville District. CME Church also sought to enlarge its dominion in 1918, Lester served on the Committee deliberating about the union of the CME, African Methodist Episcopal and African Methodist Episcopal Zion Churches into one body.

Lester was also a trustworthy member of numerous fraternal orders including the National Knight Recorder of the Knights of Friendship, Endowment secretary of the International Order of Twelve Knights and Daughters of Tabor and member of the Knights of Orient. Rebecca was elected Grand Worthy Orator of the Order of Calanthe, Grand Queen of the Independent Order of Immaculates and the Knights of Orient.

== Military activities ==
Nashville held the honor of being home to Company G, unattached, (colored), the only colored State Guard company recognized by the US Army. Company G's origins in the 1870s are rooted in the newly freed Negro's insistence of full civic participation during Reconstruction and after. J. A. Lester served as the Company Surgeon which made him responsible for maintaining a company hospital during field drills and encampments for the group of approximately sixty soldiers. Company G received top praise for its annual company drill inspection and was frequently invited to assemble before the Negro community as a symbol of Negro pride, patriotism and excellence.

After the US entered the Great War, Lester carried out other domestic wartime responsibilities. He and other notable Negro men were assigned by Special Adviser of US Secretary of War Emmett Jay Scott to the Committee of One Hundred as Four Minute Men. These public speakers would carry a supportive message into local communities regarding the War front, War-time Saving Bonds and food ration efforts. Rebecca Lester also led field workers in a highly effective campaign to gather donations and pledges for Nashville families affected negatively by the War.

== Death ==
Dr. John Angelo Lester died on September 27, 1934. He was the eldest teacher in service at Meharry. He is buried in Mt. Ararat Cemetery in Nashville, TN.
