= Addie Whiteman Dickerson =

American clubwoman and activist

- Addie Whiteman Dickerson, from a 1942 publication
- Born: 1878; Wilmington, North Carolina
- Died: May 31, 1940 (aged 61–62)
- Spouse: G. Edward Dickerson (m. 1908; died in 1940)

Addie Whiteman Dickerson (1878–1940) was a businessperson, politician, clubwoman, suffragist, and peace activist.

== Biography ==
Dickerson née Whiteman was born in 1878 in Wilmington, North Carolina. She attended the Gregory Normal School and Scotia Seminary.

In 1908 she married G. Edward Dickerson with whom she had one child. The couple settled in Philadelphia, where Dickerson had a career as a real estate broker and served as the first female African American notary public in Pennsylvania.

Dickerson was active as a clubwoman and suffragist. She was a founding member of the Philadelphia chapter of the Federated Women's Club. She was also a member of the National Association of Colored Women, and the National Council of Negro Women.

After American women won the right to vote, Dickerson ran for a seat on the Pennsylvania House of Representatives in 1930 as a Republican. She did not win. For a time she served as chairman of the Philadelphia Republican Council of Colored Women. Dickerson was also an advocate on behalf of the international peace movement. She was a founding member of the International Council of Women of the Darker Races (ICWDR). She became president of the organization in 1928.

Dickerson died on May 31, 1940.

== Legacy ==
Both Addie and G. Edward Dickerson died in 1940. They left their combined estate of about $100,000 worth of Philadelphia real estate to establish the G. Edward and Addie W. Dickerson Foundation. In 2018 a mural honoring the Dickersons was painted at the Art Sanctuary Philadelphia by the muralist Ernel Martinez as part of the Philadelphia Mural Arts Program. The Art Sanctuary Philadelphia is located in a building originally owned by the Dickersons.
