= Prince Hall Order of the Eastern Star =

African-American Masonic order

The Prince Hall Order of the Eastern Star is a Masonic appendant body affiliated with Prince Hall Freemasonry. It functions as a predominantly African-American equivalent of the mainstream Order of the Eastern Star.

== History ==
The idea for the creation of an Order of the Eastern Star for black women was first proposed by William Myers, a Grand Master in the Prince Hall Jurisdiction of the District of Columbia. With Georgiana Thomas he set about getting the ritual and organization approved by the official of the Lodge and the first Chapter of the Prince Hall Order of the Eastern Star was opened on December 1, 1874. The organization spread and in 1907 a Conference of Grand Chapters, Order of the Eastern Star.

The name was changed to Interstate Conference of Grand Chapters in 1910 and International Conference of Grand Chapters in 1924. This organization was "dismantled" by the Prince Hall Conference of Grand Masters in 1976 and is now known as the Prince Hall Conference of Grand Chapters, Order of the Eastern Star. Unlike the mainstream Order of the Eastern Star, the PHOES do not have a centralized organization. The state Grand Chapters are the main organizations, and the "annual conventions" are made up exclusively of Past Grand Matrons. The "thirty first annual convention" was held in 1979.

== Membership ==
Membership is open to women of any race. Historically, these women were the wives, mothers, sisters, widows, daughters, and granddaughters of Prince Hall Masons. In 1980 there were 175,000 members.

== Organization ==
There are 45 Grand Chapters, located in the United States, Ontario (Canada), the Bahamas, and the Caribbean.

== Ritual ==
The ritual is based on the five points of the star, the PHOES symbol, and is reportedly permeated with religious references and meanings. The women wore aprons with the five colors of the star.

== Philanthropy ==
Each Grand Chapter has its own fraternal projects. The Indian Chapter ran a home for infirm members and Prince Hall Masons. Others have sponsored nursing scholarships and "Miss Prince Hall" and "Queen of the Grand Chapter" contests.

== Notable members ==
- Fannie Emanuel
- Ruth M. Kirk
- Rebecca H. Lester
- Vivian Osborne Marsh
- Rosa Parks
- Maxine Waters

== See also ==
- Daughters of the Improved Benevolent and Protective Order of Elks of the World
