= Tench Tilghman =

Continental army officer (1744–1786)

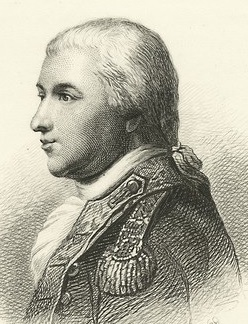
- Tench Tilghman, Revolutionary War officer
- Born: December 25, 1744; Fausley, Maryland
- Died: April 18, 1786 (aged 41); Chestertown, Maryland
- Relatives: Anna Maria Tilghman (wife) Anna Margaretta (Daughter, b. 1784) Elizabeth Tench (Daughter, b. 1786)
- Military career
- Allegiance: United States
- Rank: Lieutenant Colonel
- Unit: Aide-de-Camp
- Conflicts: American Revolutionary War: Battle of Monmouth; Siege of Yorktown

Tench Tilghman (/ˈtɪlmən/, December 25, 1744 – April 18, 1786) was an officer in the Continental Army during the American Revolutionary War. He served as an aide-de-camp to General George Washington, achieving the rank of lieutenant colonel.

Tilghman rose to become a trusted member of Washington's staff. The historic events of the time sparked his transformation from a privileged family member of Loyalists to a dedicated Patriot. He paid a high price, facing tragedies including a split with Loyalist members of his family, and illness and an early death from disease contracted during the American Revolutionary War.

== Early life, education, and career ==
Coat of Arms of Tench Tilghman

Tilghman was born on December 25, 1744, at Fausley, a plantation owned by his father, James Tilghman, located on Fausley Creek, a branch of the Miles River, in Talbot County, Maryland, a few miles from the town of Easton. His mother was Anne Francis Tilghman; his father was a lawyer and noted Loyalist. Like many prominent planter families of the Eastern Shore of Maryland, the Tilghman family had social and business ties with business elites in Philadelphia, and has intermarried with some prominent Philadelphia families. Tilghman was the eldest of six brothers and four sisters.

Tilghman likely attended a plantation school, and subsequently was schooled by John Gordon, rector of St. Michael's Parish. He was sent by his grandfather, Tench Francis, to Philadelphia in 1758, at the age of 14, to the Academy and College of Philadelphia (which later evolved into the University of Pennsylvania), from which he was graduated in May 1761. Tilghman then became a partner in Francis-Tilghman Company, a mercantile business formed with Tench Francis, Jr., an uncle on his mother's side. The enterprise was initially successful but dissolved in 1775.

== Revolutionary service ==
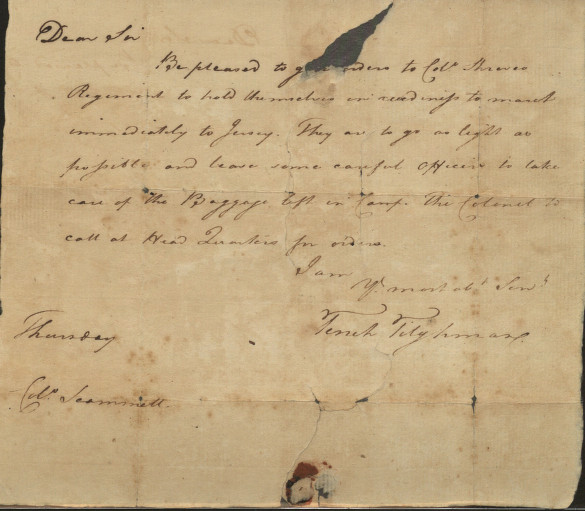
Letter from Tench Tilghman to George Washington, circa 1776–1781

In July 1775, the Second Continental Congress appointed him to one of the commissioners directed to make treaties with Indians along the frontier, seeking to ensure that they would remain neutral in the American Revolutionary War. Tench was named to the commission to the Six Nations (Iroquois Confederacy) and tribes towards the north.

In the summer of 1775, Tilghman became a lieutenant in the 3rd Battalion of the Philadelphia volunteer light infantry company commanded by Sharpe Dulaney. The company was integrated into the Continental Army in New Jersey in the Flying Camp military formation in June or July 1776. On August 8, 1776, he became one of the aides-de-camp to George Washington, the commander-in-chief of the Continental Army. How Tilghman came to join Washington's staff is a mystery, but the Washington family and Tilghman family had familial connections.

Tilghman served Washington as secretary until the end of the war, mostly without pay. Before Colonel Alexander Hamilton (then a young artillery officer) joined Washington's staff, Tilghman was the only aide-de-camp to Washington who was conversant in the French language, a critical skill given the many French military men who had joined the revolutionary cause. During the Battle of Monmouth in 1778 and afterwards, Tilghman interpreted written and verbal communications between Washington, Lafayette, Von Steuben, and commanders of the Continental Army's French allies.

Tilghman's Patriot loyalties split his family. He became the first among his eleven siblings to join the Revolutionary cause. Most of the Tilghman family served the King, as did many other rich families at that time. His brothers Richard and Philemon served in the British military. Another brother, William Tilghman, wanted to follow in their father's path and study law in England, which created a professional conflict for Tench Tilghman, who refused him passage to England on June 12, 1781.

I am placed in as delicate a situation as it is possible for a man to be. I am, from my station, a master of the most valuable secrets of the Cabinet, and the master of the field and it might give cause of umbrage and suspicion at this critical moment to interest myself in procuring the passage of a brother to England.

The Siege of Yorktown in October 1781 culminated in a Patriot victory and an honor for Tilghman, whom Washington picked to carry the surrender papers to the Continental Congress in Philadelphia. On October 29, 1781, the Continental Congress voted Tilghman "a horse properly caparisoned and an elegant sword in testimony of their high opinion of his merit and ability." Tilghman's ride from Yorktown to Philadelphia was commemorated in poems by Clinton Scollard and Howard Pyle. Tilghman's own journal entry was terse:

In the morning Lord Cornwallis put out a letter requesting 24 hours must be granted to the commissioners to settle terms of capitulation of the posts of York and Gloster. The General answered that only two hours would be allowed for him to send out his terms. He accordingly sent them out generally as follows, that the Garrisons should be prisoners of war, the German and British soldiers to be sent to England and Germany. The General answered on the 18th that the terms of sending the troops to England and Germany were inadmissible. Lord Cornwallis closed with all the terms except the same honors granted at Charlestown.

In a letter to Tilghman the following year, Washington's humor and admiration is apparent:

Till your letter of the 28th arrived which is the first from you and the only direct account of you since we departed at Philadelphia, we have various conjectures about you. Some thought you were dead—others that you were married—and all that you have forgot us. Your letter is not a more evident contradiction of the first and last of these suppositions than it is a tacit conformation of the second and as none can wish you greater success in the prosecution of the plan you are upon than I do...you have no friend who wishes more to see you than I do.

As the war formally ended with peace negotiations, Washington discussed the surrender of King George III with his trusted aide:

The obstinacy of the King and his unwillingness to acknowledge the independency of this country, I have ever considered as the greatest obstacles in the way of a peace.

== Later life and death ==
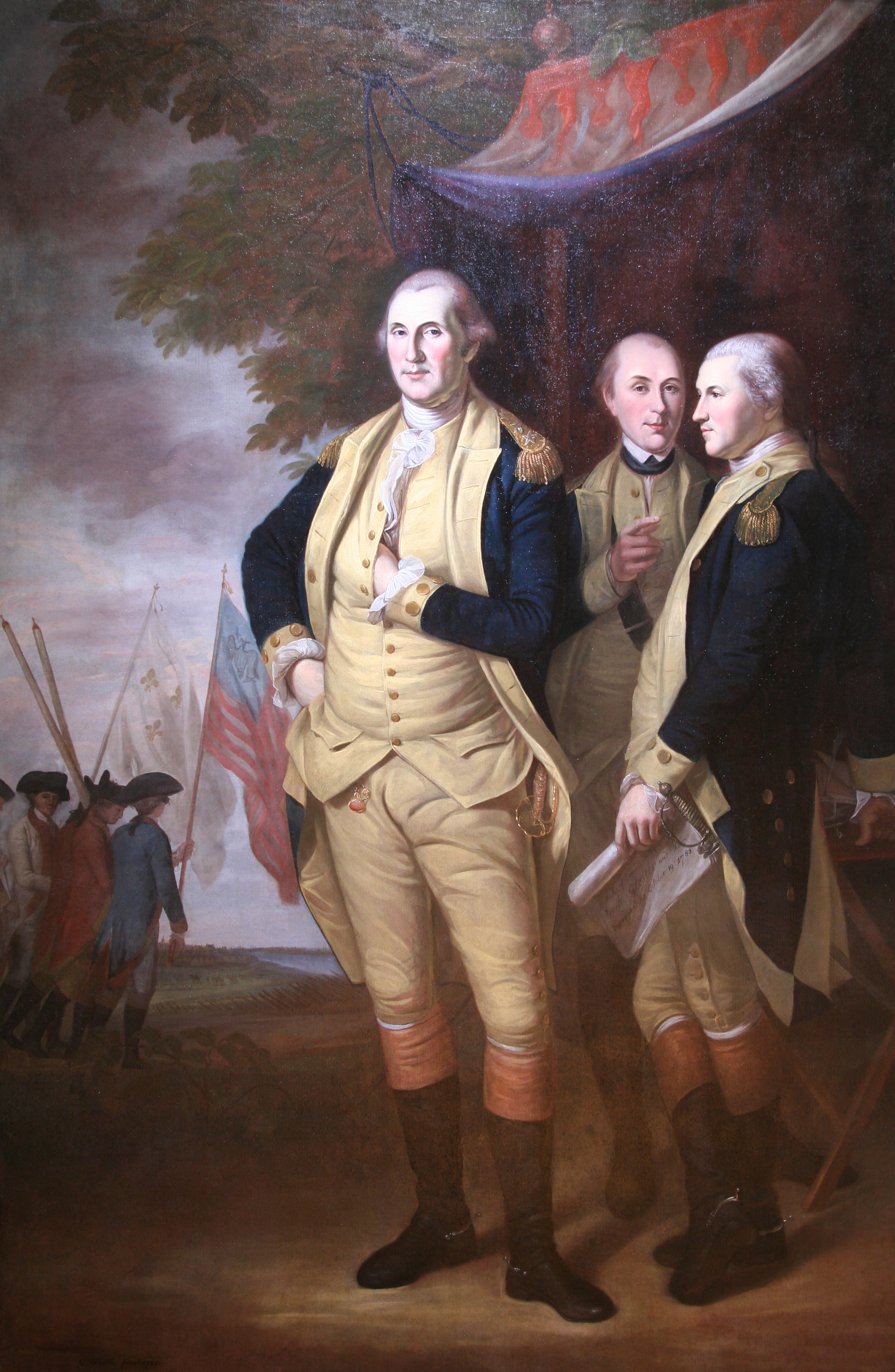
Washington, Lafayette & Tilghman at Yorktown, by Charles Willson Peale, 1784

The National Park Service writes that Tilghman was even sick during his ride from Yorktown to Philadelphia "with chills and fever" and that he left the army in 1783 with failing health. Nonetheless, he restarted his business after the war, shipping wheat, tobacco, and other American products to Spain, in exchange for which Valentin Riera [head of a Spanish company] shipped wine and manufactured products to Baltimore.

On June 9, 1783, in St. Michael's Parish, Tilghman married Anna Maria Tilghman, his first cousin and daughter of Matthew Tilghman. Together they had two children: Anna Margaretta, born May 24, 1784, and Elizabeth Tench, born October 11, 1786.

Tilghman was admitted as an original member of The Society of the Cincinnati of Maryland when it was established in November 1783. He died in Chestertown, Maryland, on April 18, 1786, at the age of 41.

Washington's regard for Tilghman can be inferred from their joint portrait with Lafayette by Charles Willson Peale. After Tilghman's death, Washington wrote to his brother Thomas Ringgold Tilghman and to his father James Tilghman:

As there were few men for whom I had a warmer friendship, or greater regard than for your Brother—Colonel Tilghman—when living; so, with much truth I can assure you, that, there are none whose death I could more sincerely have regretted. and I pray you, & his numerous friends to permit me to mingle my sorrows with theirs on this unexpected & melancholy occasion.

Of all the numerous acquaintances of your lately deceased son, & amidst all the sorrowings that are mingled on that melancholy occasion, I may venture to assert that (excepting those of his nearest relatives) none could have felt his death with more regret than I did—No one entertained a higher opinion of his worth, or had imbibed sentiments of greater friendship for him than I had done.

== Posthumous honors ==
Tilghman is buried in an historic cemetery in Oxford, Maryland. The horizontal lid on his grave vault references his achievements under Washington. A brass plaque on the stone lid notes that his remains were reinterred from Old St. Paul's, Baltimore on November 30, 1971. Adjacent to his grave, the Tench Tilghman Monument is a spire.

The Maryland State Archives has a painting of Tilghman and two swords which he once owned, which his descendant Mrs. Judith Goldsborough Oates donated to the State of Maryland on December 26, 1997.

The Tench Tilghman Elementary/Middle School, part of the Baltimore City Public Schools, is named in his honor. He is also the namesake of a Baltimore City recreation center and a Daughters of the American Revolution chapter in Bethesda, Maryland.

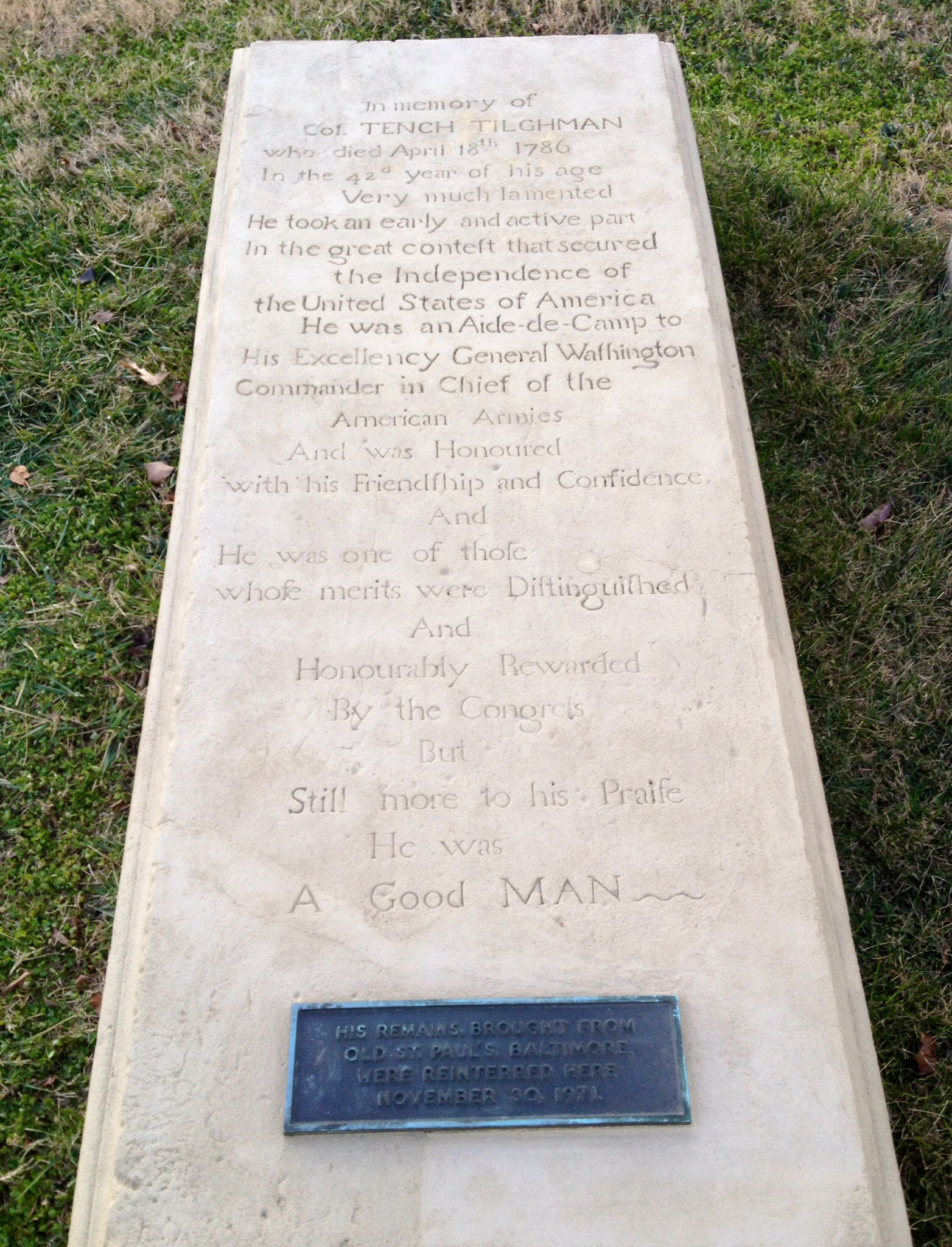
Grave lid, Oxford Cemetery

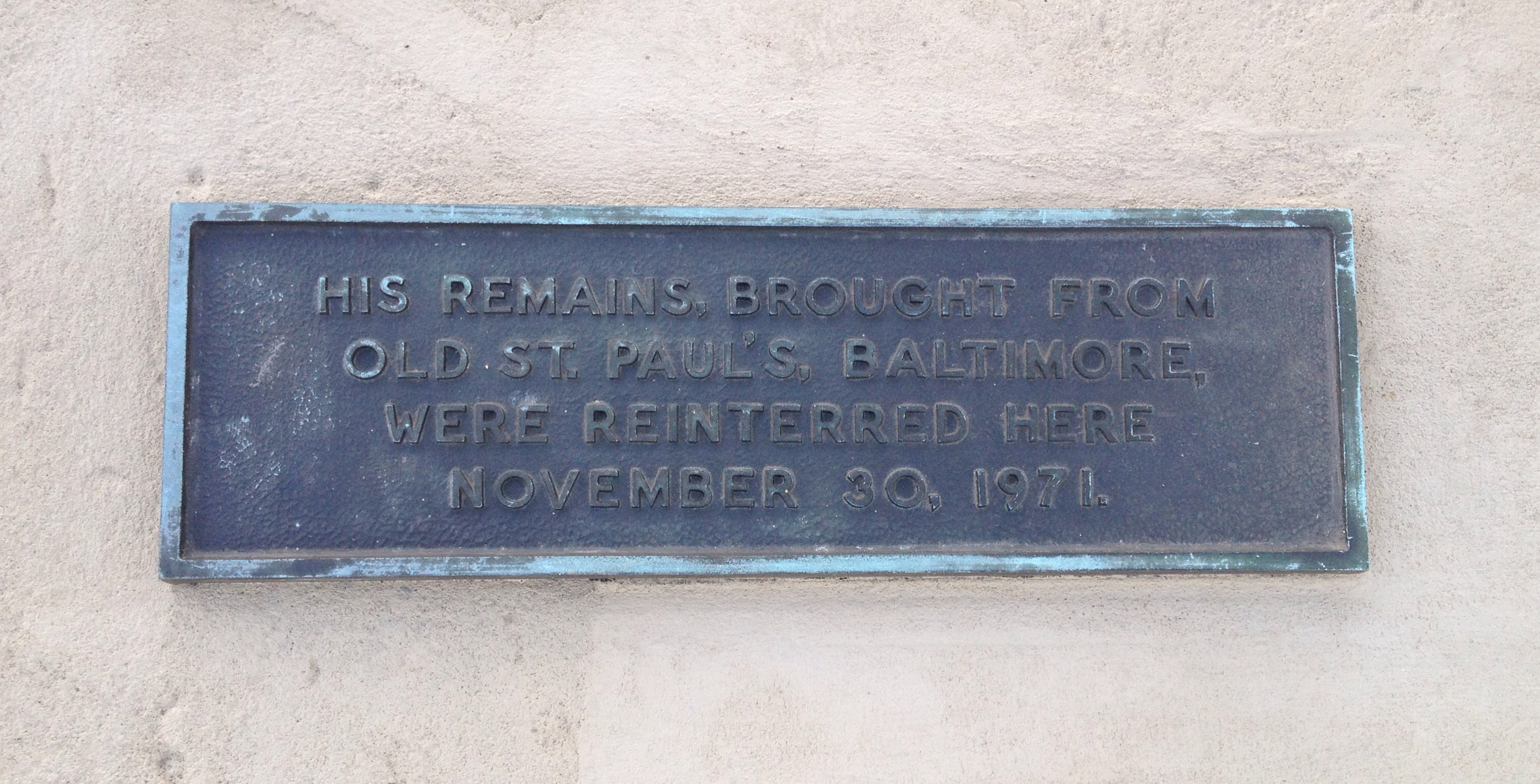
Grave plaque, Oxford Cemetery

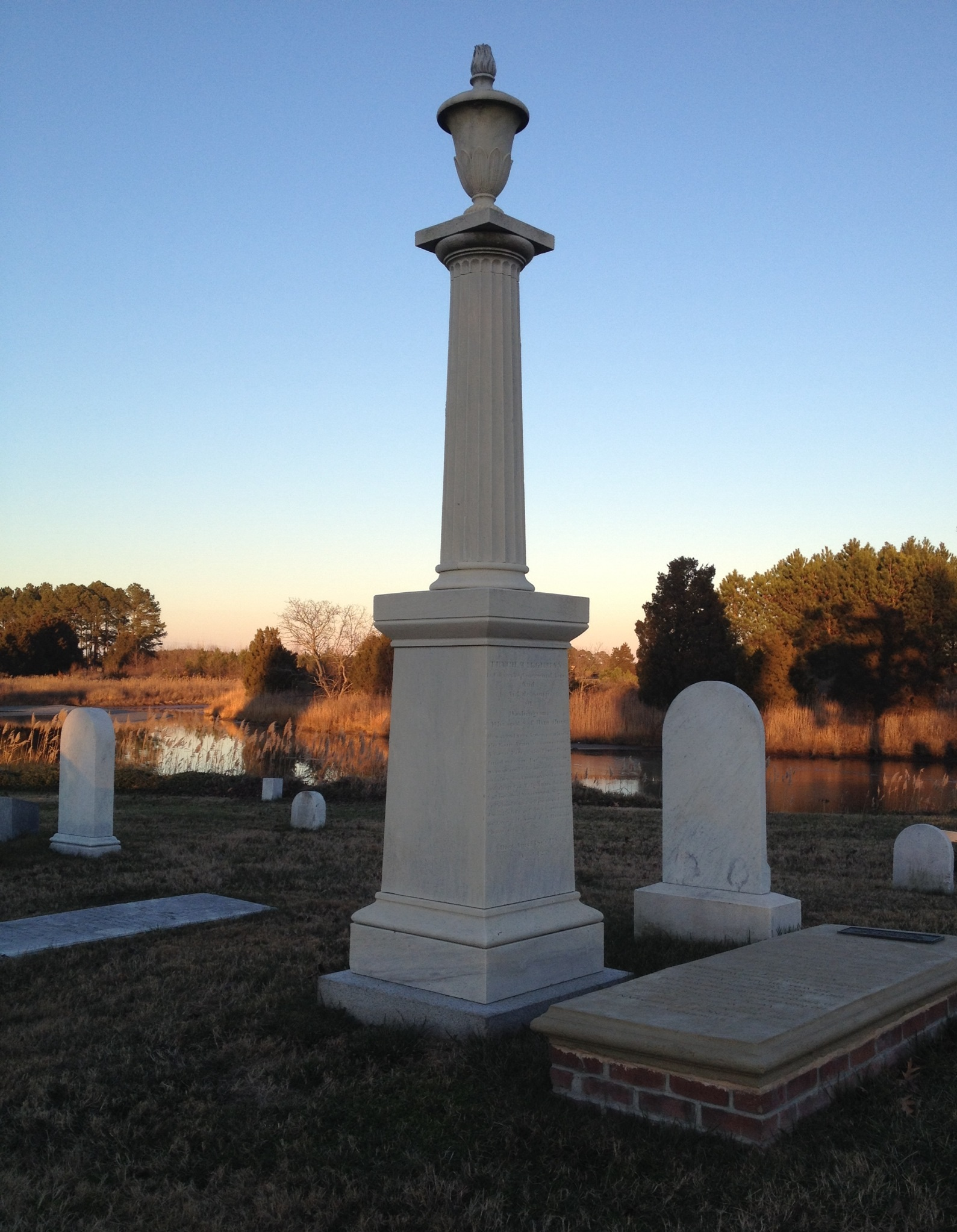
Tench Tilghman monument, Oxford Cemetery
