= Carrie A. Tuggle =

American educator, philanthropist, and social activist

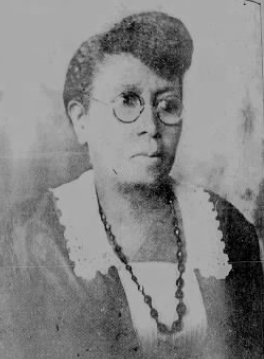
- Born: May 28, 1858; Eufaula, Alabama, United States
- Died: November 5, 1924 (aged 66)
- Known for: Abolitionist, Philanthropist, Educator, Women's rights advocate

Carrie A. Tuggle (May 28, 1858 – November 5, 1924) was an American educator, philanthropist, and social activist. After emancipation, she sought for equality in education, and the right to exercise voting rights in Birmingham, Alabama. She established Tuggle Institute, a local boarding school for Black children who were destitute orphans and juvenile defendants and were given free education. The Tuggle Institute functioned with support from the Order of Calanthe and the Knights and Ladies of Honor of Alabama.

== Early life ==
Tuggle was born on May 28, 1858, at Eufaula, Alabama. Her parents were a former slave and a Mohawk Indian chief. Though born into slavery in dire conditions, she rose to become a leader among the Black community of Birmingham. She married John Tuggle, a native of Columbus Ohio, and moved to Birmingham in the early 1900s, in search of better economic opportunities and a social life. The couple had four children.

== Career ==
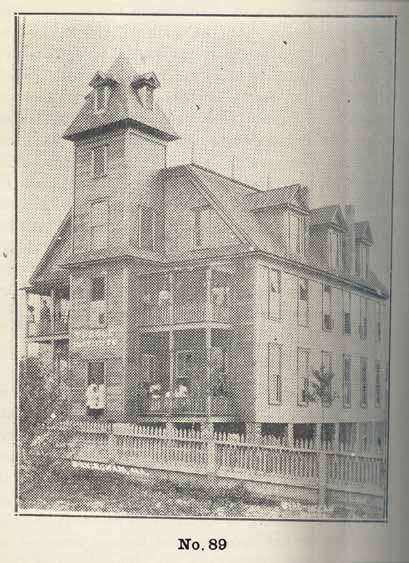
The Tuggle Institute in 1906.

In Birmingham, Tuggle held the position of Grand Worthy Councilor from 1891 to 1899. In 1901, she was appointed to the Office of Supreme Worthy Councilor after her husband had refused to contest for the post. She created and edited a Black newspaper, the Birmingham Truth, between 1902 and 1910.

Early in her career as a social worker, Tuggle pleaded before a court to pardon two juvenile delinquents from a prison sentence, volunteering to take them under her care and reform them. This action received appreciation from residents such as A. G. Gaston, and inspired her to establish the Jefferson County Juvenile and Domestic Court. The Tuggle Institute was opened by her on 3 September 1903, created with a meager US$2.50. The institute's basic objective was to provide a home to destitute children and to educate them. At this time, she was associated with many institutions in Birmingham such as Courts of Calanthe, Knights and Ladies of Honour of the World, and Rising Sons and Daughters of Protection, which helped support the Tuggle Institute. She also sought support from the philanthropists of Birmingham's White Community, and financial backing from Louis Pizitz and his wife and A. B. Loveman.

Initially, the school was a temporary structure, but she saw to it that an academic curriculum was created covering subjects such as industry, nursing and music. Tragedy struck the school in 1919 when it burned down in a suspected arson attack. Following the fire, the school was shifted to a nearby church, and teaching and care of children was continued, until the institute's building was reconstructed and gained a reputation as "one of most effective and beneficial institutions of the South". Support for constructing the building complex for expansion of the school was provided by the White supporters, particularly the small Jewish community, of Birmingham. Among the notable students of the institute were Dr. A. G. Gaston, John T. Whatley, and Erskine Hawkins.

Tuggle did much towards the cause of women's suffrage in Jefferson County, urging many other Black women including teachers to register as voters. At this stage she suffered setbacks in her personal life when one of her daughters, Mamie Adams, a leading social activist, died.

== Death and legacy ==
Tuggle continued her struggle to raise funds, which had an adverse effect on her health. Confined to bed for six months, she died in 1924. After her death, in 1926 the Tuggle Institute became part of the Birmingham City Public Schools. In 1934, it was bought by the City Board of Education and the Institute renamed as Enon Ridge School. In 1936, again the Board of Education altered the name to Tuggle Elementary School. There is a plaque in the school in honor of her memory with the inscription "Carrie A. Tuggle, a scholar, educator and servant of mankind."

Photograph of Carrie A. Tuggle Elementary School

In Tuggle's honor, the Tuggle Memorial, a memorial stele in Birmingham's Kelly Ingram Park, was unveiled by two of her descendants, encouraged by Dr. A. G. Gaston, a businessperson of Birmingham who studied in the Tuggle Institute. The stele recognizes her work on behalf of orphans and juvenile defendants, and her role as a philanthropist and educator.

Angela Davis attended Carrie A. Tuggle Elementary School.

== Bibliography ==
- Dwyer, Owen J.; Alderman, Derek H. (2008). Civil Rights Memorials and the Geography of Memory. University of Georgia Press. p. 48. ISBN 978-1-930066-83-0.
- Flynt, Wayne (October 10, 2004). Alabama in the Twentieth Century. University of Alabama Press. ISBN 978-0-8173-1430-9.
- Gasman, Marybeth; Sedgwick, Katherine V. (2005). Uplifting a People: African American Philanthropy and Education. Peter Lang. ISBN 978-0-8204-7474-8.
- Johnson, John H., ed. (February 7, 1980). "Jet". Jet. Vol. 57, no. 21. Johnson Publishing Company. pp. 40–. ISSN 0021-5996.
- Loder-Jackson, Tondra L. (October 26, 2015). Schoolhouse Activists: African American Educators and the Long Birmingham Civil Rights Movement. SUNY Press. ISBN 978-1-4384-5861-8.
- Peebles, Marilyn T. (August 16, 2012). The Alabama Knights of Pythias of North America, South America, Europe, Asia, Africa, and Australia: A Brief History. University Press of America. ISBN 978-0-7618-5815-7.
