= Musette Brooks Gregory =

- Born: October 10, 1876; Washington, D.C., USA
- Died: July 26, 1921 (aged 44); Mount McGregor, Saratoga County, New York, USA
- Occupation: Suffragist
- Known for: New Jersey Suffrage Ratification Committee, Working Girls' Home, New Jersey Foundation of Colored Women's Club, Colored Mission of the Diocesan Auxiliary of the Cathedral of St. John the Divine, National Association for the Advancement of Colored People

Musette Brooks Gregory (October 10, 1876 – July 26, 1921) was an African-American suffragist and civil rights activist.

== Biography ==
Gregory was born on 10 October 1876 to Eugene and Oceanna Everett Brooks. The family lived in Washington, D.C., where Musette attended public school. While living in Washington, D.C., Gregory was a principal's clerk and the supervisor of first-year work for the 13th District public schools. As a clerk, Gregory was exposed to teaching, and would later become a teacher herself. Gregory was also very involved in community service. She held leadership positions in the Music School Settlement in New York and was a member of the board of the Old Folks’ Home of Newark. She was a member and ex-President of the Phyllis Wheatley Literary Society of Newark. On June 23, 1904, Gregory married Eugene Monroe Gregory, a Harvard University graduate. While Musette Gregory was teaching, Eugene Gregory was enrolled in Columbian University (now George Washington University) to study law. Originally, the couple lived in Trenton, but they moved to Newark in 1910. They had no children.

Gregory died on July 26, 1921, in New York. Because of her significant achievements with civil rights and suffrage, the Federation of Colored Women’s Clubs named a scholarship after her.

New Jersey Women's Suffrage Group

== Suffrage work ==
Throughout her career, Gregory was involved with several women’s organizations, especially in New Jersey. In addition to her work in New Jersey, she actively worked alongside social services in New York. In 1919, she attended a rally in New Jersey, where she was elected to the executive committee for the New Jersey Suffrage Ratification Committee. The goal of the NJSRC was to help elect men that supported the 19th amendment. They wanted them to be in office before and during the election to get more voters. The NJSRC worked in partnership with organizations such as the New Jersey Suffrage Association, the State Federation of Women’s Club, the State Federation of Colored Women’s Club, and the State Women’s Christian Temperance Movement. In addition to her suffrage work, Gregory was the superintendent of the Working Girls’ Home in New York.

== Civil rights work ==
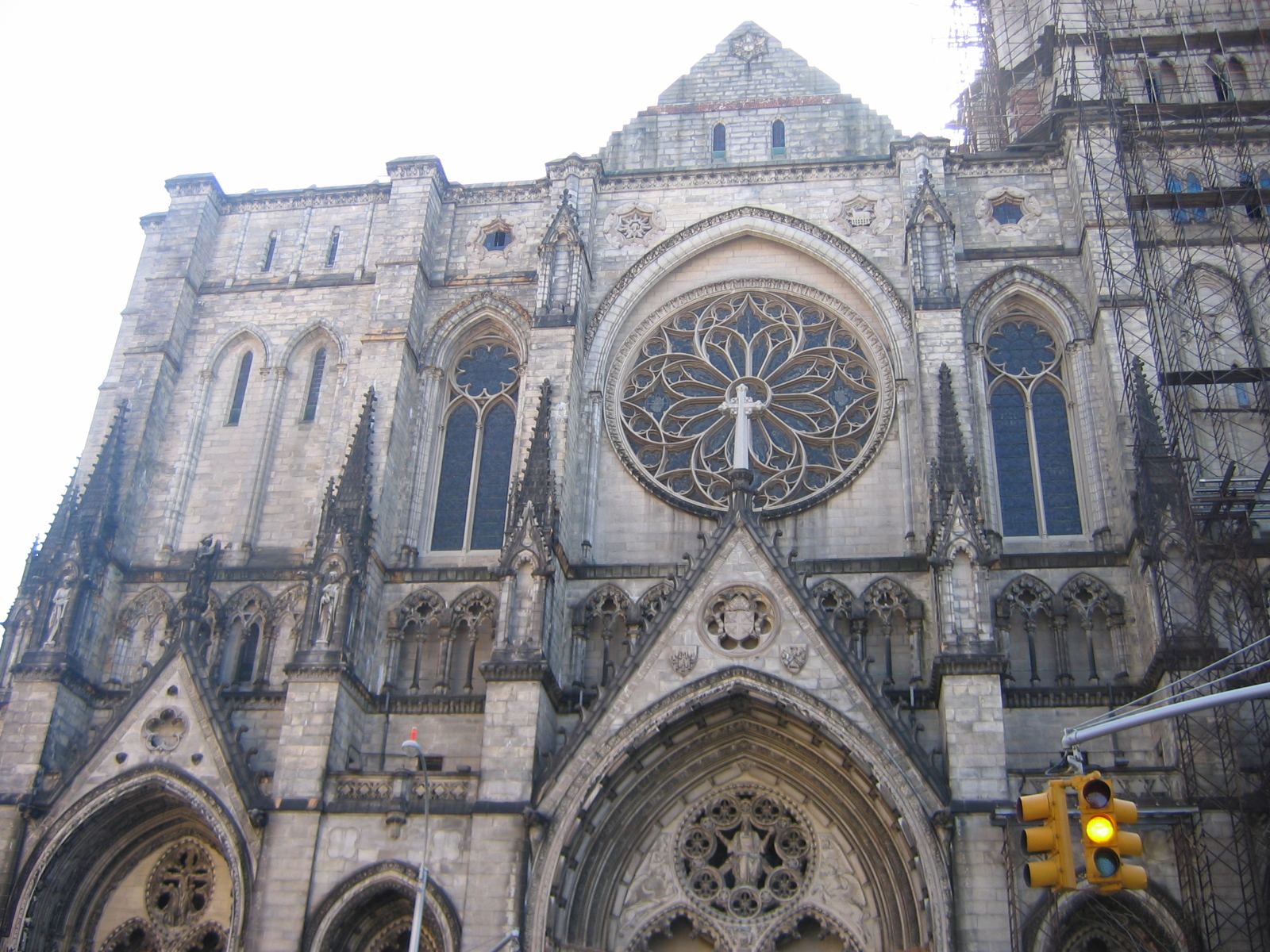
The Cathedral of St. John the Divine

Civil rights work was important to Gregory. She became the secretary and chairman of the executive board for the New Jersey Foundation of Colored Women’s Clubs, the oldest African-American secular organization in existence today. This organization is committed to addressing the needs of black women. One of Gregory's main projects was her work with the Colored Mission of the Diocesan Auxiliary of the Cathedral of St. John the Divine in New York, where she became the superintendent. Under this mission, she worked at the Home for the Working Girls at 132 West 131st Street, New York City, where she helped protect young working class African-American girls. The mission helped keep them out of prostitution by preparing them for work with cooking, sewing, and housekeeping. They also provided the girls counseling. Gregory was highly involved with the National Association for the Advancement of Colored People, becoming the Vice President of the Newark Branch.

== Death ==
Gregory died in 1921 on July 26 after a long illness. An obit was published in The Crisis and the Newark Evening News, among others.
