= Mame Stewart Josenberger =

American educator and businesswoman (1868–1964)

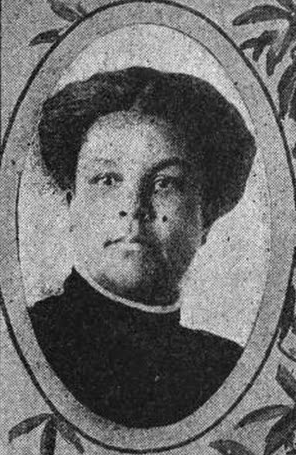
Mame Stewart Josenberger, from a 1920 publication.

Mame Stewart Josenberger (August 3, 1868 – September 29, 1964) was an American educator, businesswoman, and clubwoman, based in Arkansas for most of her career.

== Early life ==
Mary "Mame" Stewart, born August 3, 1868 (sources vary on the year) in Owego, New York, the daughter of Frank Stewart and Mary Elizabeth Turner Stewart. She trained as a teacher at Fisk University, where her classmates included W. E. B. DuBois and Margaret Murray Washington. She remained active with the Fisk University Alumni Association throughout her life.

== Career ==
Stewart taught at the State Normal School for Negroes in Holly Springs, Mississippi, and at Howard School and Fort Smith High School in Fort Smith, Arkansas. From 1903 to 1916, she was "Grand Register of Deeds" for the Order of Calanthe, a fraternal organization that offered burial insurance for African-Americans. She also held the rank of Supreme Assistant Conductress in the organization after 1907.

Josenberger was a businesswoman in Fort Smith, Arkansas. From 1909 she ran her late husband's business as an undertaker. She also owned an auditorium (Josenberger Hall) and a hardware store, and was a landlord in the black community. She was a member of the National Negro Business League, and the Fort Smith Negro Business League. She served on the board of the Standard Life Insurance Company.

Josenberger was active in the National Association of Colored Women's Clubs (NACW), serving in various offices at the national level. She was president of the Arkansas Association of Colored Women's Clubs (AACW) from 1929 to 1931. At the local level, she was the founder of the Fort Smith Phillis Wheatley Club, and its president for over fifty years. She was a lifetime member of the NAACP, and active in the International Council of Women of the Darker Races.

== Personal life ==
Mame Stewart married William Ernest Josenberger, an undertaker and postal carrier, in 1892; they were the parents of a daughter, Ernestine (1893–1919). Mame Stewart Josenberger was widowed in 1909. She died in 1964, in her nineties.
