= Elizabeth Lindsay Davis =

African-American teacher and activist

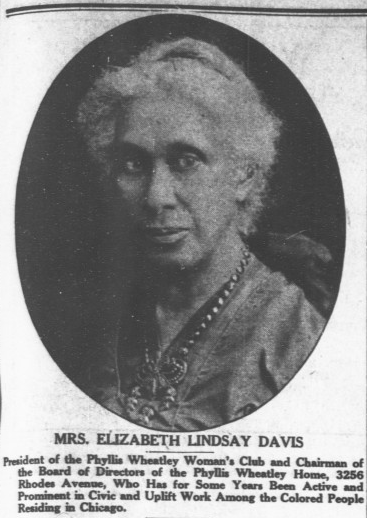
- Elizabeth Lindsay Davis, 1921.
- Born: 1855; Peoria, Illinois, U.S.
- Died: 1944 (aged 88–89); Chicago, Illinois, U.S.
- Spouse: Dr. William Davis

Elizabeth Lindsay Davis (1855-1944) was an African-American teacher, writer, and activist. She was responsible for forming the Phyllis Wheatley Women's Club in Chicago, Illinois in 1900. Over the course of her life, she participated and contributed to the advancement of African-American women. In 1922, she wrote The Story of the Illinois Federation of Colored Women's Clubs, a book highlighting the history of women's organizations and their notable members in the state of Illinois. In 1933, she published her book Lifting as They Climb about the history of the National Association of Colored Women. During her life, she collaborated with Ida B. Wells and W.E.B. DuBois to contribute to the progress and to support African-American women during the early 20th century.

== Life ==
Elizabeth L. Davis was born in 1855 to Thomas and Sophia Jane Lindsay in the town of Peoria, Illinois. She later attended and graduated with high honors from Princeton Township High School in Princeton, Illinois. Graduating in 1873, Davis was one of the school's first black graduates and was chosen to give a commencement speech for her graduating class, which she titled, "The Past and Future of the Negro." Her graduation speech went on to be reprinted in the Bureau County Republican and the Chicago and Peoria papers.

Excerpt from Davis' commencement speech, "The Past and Future of the Negro":

Give the African race 200 years of freedom, respect and education instead of 200 years of slavery, prejudice and ignorance, and they will attain to an equal point of civilization and intelligence with that of any other people. During the rebellion, the slaves were willing to fight and die if need be for an imperfect freedom; yet it was very hard to persuade the north to give them a fair chance for even that. Give us everywhere the same privileges that we enjoy in this community, surrounded as we are by the associations connected with the memory of the immortal Lovejoy, who worked and pleaded for our race long before there was any prospect of obtaining freedom, then — after 200 years of such privileges, judge us.

She subsequently taught school in various towns, and married William Davis in 1885. They moved to Chicago in 1893.

Early in her career, Davis contributed to various newspapers and publications including Kansas City's Gate City Press, the Chicago Defender, and the NACW’s National Notes.

== Activism ==
In March 1896, Davis co-founded the Chicago chapter of the Phyllis Wheatley Women’s Club. This club worked to provide a home for young women without housing and also provided opportunities for black women entering the newly professionalized field of social work. Davis served as the club's president for 28 years.

=== Role in founding the Illinois Federation of Colored Women's Clubs ===
Davis attended the very first meeting of the National Association of Colored Women's Clubs, alongside other notable women, including Harriet Tubman, Francis Ellen Watkins Harper, Victoria Earle Matthews, and Josephine S. Yates. Davis and Ida B. Wells Barnett and were the delegates from Illinois. Davis was also one of two elected delegates for Chicago who were responsible for inviting the National Association of Colored Women to hold its next biennial meeting in their city in 1899. Seven clubs, which included the Phyllis Wheatley Women's Club, came together to organize the event, calling it the Women's Conference. The clubs involved in the initial Women's Conference were later referred to as the "Magic Seven."

After hosting the NACW, the participants of the Women's Conference realized the potential of having a state-level organization, so the Women's Conference became a permanent organization known as the Illinois Federation of Colored Women’s Clubs (IFCWC).
