= Rebecca H. Lester =

Tennessean Entrepreneur, clubwoman died in 1928

Rebecca (Hurt) Lester
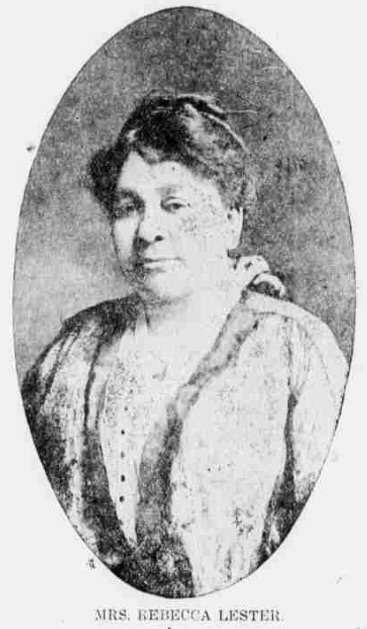
- Born: Rebecca Hurt c. 1865; Nashville, Tennessee, US
- Died: January 6, 1928 (aged 64); Nashville, Tennessee, US
- Occupations: Entrepreneur, clubwoman
- Spouse: John Angelo Lester

Rebecca Hurt Lester was an entrepreneur, clubwoman and civic leader in Nashville, Tennessee. She served as treasurer of the Tennessee Federation of Colored Women's Clubs. She was appointed to the Davidson County Colored Women division of the Council of National Defense in various capacities during World War I. Mrs. Lester also served as a Republican primary election clerk and judge for Davidson County in 1922 and 1924, respectively.

== Personal history ==
Rebecca was born in Tennessee and raised by her sister and brother in law, Rachel and Fountain Winston since infancy. Fountain was enlisted in the 44th United States Colored Infantry Regiment and employed as a porter of Tennessee Governor Malcolm R. Patterson. In 1887, Rebecca married Frank M. Taylor, once employed at the notorious Climax Saloon, later co-owned The Manhattan, a saloon located on Cedar St. She was widowed in 1899. Rebecca was bequeathed Frank's interest in the saloon and their South Nashville residence. In 1901, Rebecca wed Dr. John Angelo Lester. Rebecca birthed four children, who all died by 1900.

== Entrepreneur ==
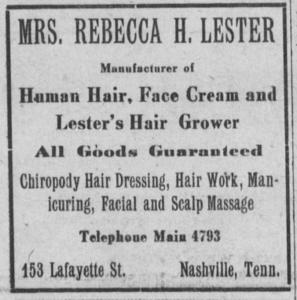
Advertisement of Mrs. Rebecca H. Lester Chiropody & Cosmetics business in Nashville Globe, March 21, 1913

Rebecca Lester owned a women's salon providing chiropody and hair dressing services. Giving herself advantage in the growing hairdressing market, Rebecca obtained a Pure Food and Drug Act license to certify the safety of her manufactured products. Her home-based business was advertised in the Nashville Globe. Public gatherings such as the annual Greenwood Park Colored Fair is where Rebecca presented her chiropody/hair dressing products and services. There she also displayed her domestic skills, cultural refinement and material endowment. These attributes were an aspiration among rural African American women recently migrating to the city. She won prizes for her embroidery, paintings and canned fruit. In 1915, Rebecca presided over the Women's Business League and participated in Negro Booster Club Week to increase Negro spending.

== Social history ==
Rebecca's social and political activities confronted the challenges that the South presented to the African American community. Socially mobile African American women utilized the club movement, unions and associations to satisfy essential needs of the most vulnerable in their communities. The Nashville chapter of the National Association of Colored Women was formed in December 1896. The next year, the national organization's 1st conference was held in Nashville during the Tennessee Centennial and International Exposition.

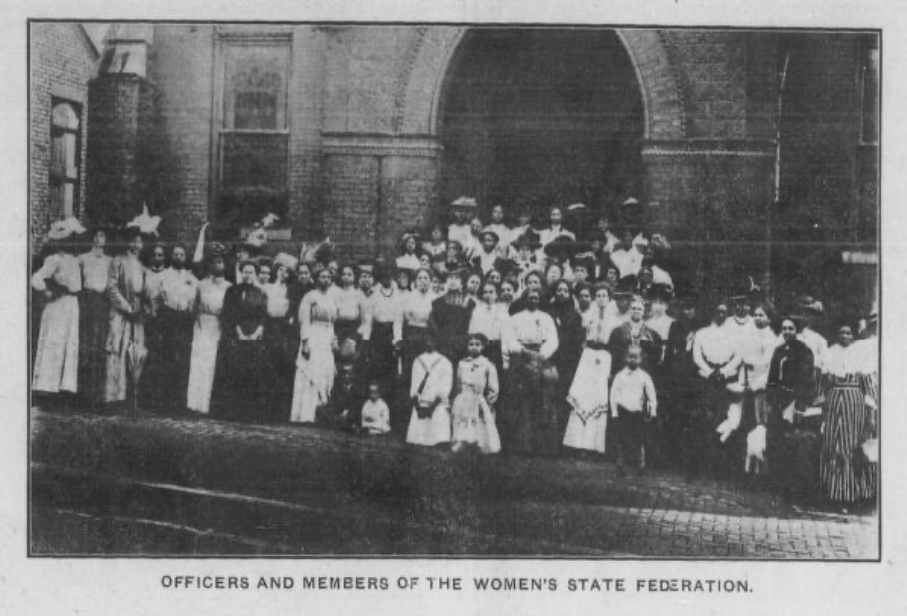
Group photo of Tennessee State Federation of Colored Women's Clubs' Third Annual Convention in front of First Baptist Church, June 9–10, 1910

Rebecca's organizing and outreach skills benefited several Nashville women's clubs including Carnation Club, Hubbard Hospital Club, Friday Night Review Club and Coterie Club. Partly social gathering and civic activism, Nashville women clubs modeled hygiene and homekeeping, literacy and education and public health development. At a 1913 Marechal Niel Art Club meeting, Rebecca served her guests on chinaware used by Dr. Lester's mother before the Civil War. By 1916, Rebecca was elected treasurer of Tennessee's State Federation of Colored Clubs. Rebecca held elected positions in several of Nashville's African American mutual aid lodges. The Order of Calanthe, the women's counterpart to the Knights of Pythias of North America, South America, Europe, Asia, Africa and Australia had $10,800 in funds in 1910, with 6,000 financial members. Rebecca was a member of the Union Harmony chapter of the Order. At the 1917 St. Louis Conclave, Rebecca was Supreme representative and Grand Worthy Orator at a well-attended public gathering held after the violent East St. Louis massacre.

During the 1913 Easter service of the Independent Order of Immaculates at St. Paul AME Church, Rebecca Lester was elected the Grand Queen in honor of Meritorious Service, a new title created the year before. Rebecca was ceremoniously seated in the pulpit in purple robe, gold crown and scepter. Rebecca was also a member and officer of the Mt Pisgah Chapter 51 of the Prince Hall Order of the Eastern Star.

== Separate car law ==
Tennessee passed its first statewide Jim Crow laws in 1881. Immediately thereafter civil suits were initiated to prevent separate and “unequal” railroad accommodations which exposed African American women to smoke-filled, noisy railroad cars, often the site of public vulgarities. Rebecca traveled regularly by railroad. In 1904 the Lesters entered a civil suit against the Choctaw, Oklahoma and Gulf Railroad for $5,000. In damages. Rebecca alleged that she was denied a sleeping berth and subjected to unequal accommodations which caused her to be assaulted by white men. The following year, the Nashville Streetcar protest against segregated light rail accommodations commenced.

== Republican election activities ==
Rebecca's political activities occurred during the Progressive era, when the ratification of the “justly entitled” Nineteenth Amendment gave women the right to vote. Toppling the nationwide voting barrier for women, Tennessee was the deciding state in a long-fought Republican victory. Rebecca served on the Advisory Committee of the colored Republican state campaign committee. In Tennessee, groups such as the Lincoln League, strategized on effective means to defend African American interests within its fragile political alliance with the lily-white Republican party. In the Benevolent Hall on Maury Street, Rebecca served as a clerk of the Third Ward during the 1922 Republican primary election. Two years later, she served as election judge for the Fourteenth Ward. The certified election poll site was the Lester residence at 153 Lafayette, South Nashville.

== World War I ==
By 1917, Rebecca was authorized by the Council of National Defense to manage war service efforts beginning with her field work for the colored War Saving Stamp (WSS) campaign.

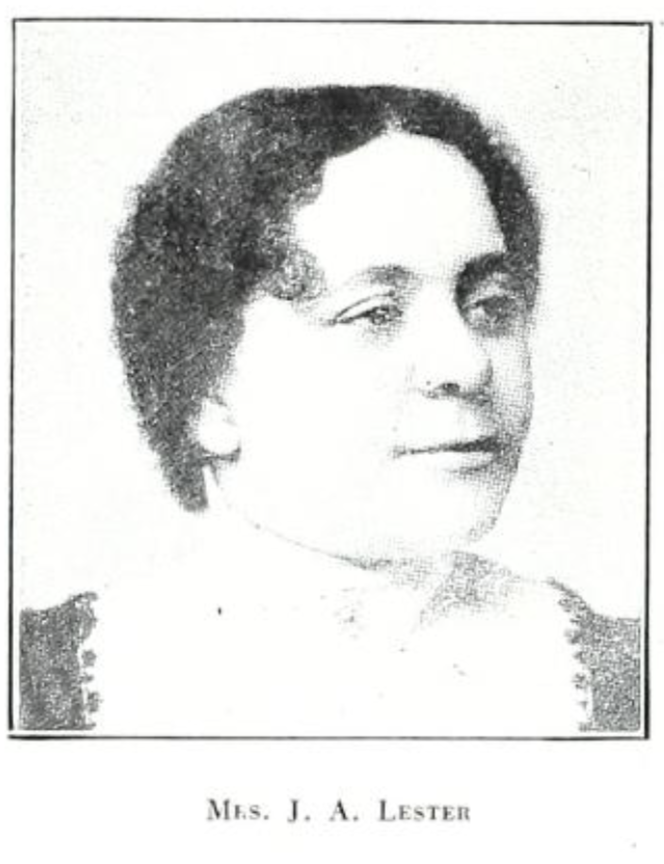
Photograph of Mrs. Rebecca H. Lester published in "Davidson County women in the world war, 1914-1919"

Her committee organized the Bishop Tyree WSS Club, held public meetings, coordinated publicity and received $4,000. of all public pledges. For that patriotic effort, Lester's committee was presented with a silk banner celebrating their success at Meharry Medical College's auditorium.

Rebecca chaired the Meharry Unit of Fourth & Victory Liberty Loan campaign in 1918 and 1919, respectively, which sold the largest amount of war relief savings bonds. The Meharry Unit of Victory Liberty Loan campaign was presented in uniform during a Nashville parade all wearing a 100 Per Cent sash across their shoulders. Her team participated in local clean-up activities for Civilian Relief. The Meharry Unit, composed of colored women, raised $26,050.00 for the Victory Liberty Loan campaign. Lester's outreach efforts were achieved by public campaigning at the Negro YMCA, Fisk University Carnegie Library and various churches throughout the Fourteenth Ward.

== Death ==
Rebecca Lester died at home on January 6, 1928.
