= Sylviane =

Given name list

Sylviane may refer to:

- Sylviane Agacinski (born 1945), French philosopher, author, professor, wife of Lionel Jospin
- Sylviane Berthod (born 1977), female alpine skier from Switzerland
- Sylviane Deferne (born 1965), Swiss pianist and musician
- Sylviane Diouf, historian and writer of Franco-Senegalese origin
- Sylviane Félix (born 1977), track and field sprint athlete, Olympic medallist for France
- Sylviane Puntous, Canadian former triathlete who won the Hawaii Ironman Triathlon in 1983 and 1984
