= Order of Calanthe =

African American women's fraternal organization

- Founded: 1883; 143 years ago Louisiana, US
- Type: Benefit society
- Affiliation: Knights of Pythias of North America, South America, Europe, Asia, Africa and Australia
- Status: Active
- Emphasis: African American women
- Scope: National
- Motto: "Fidelity, Harmony, and Love"
- Chapters: 33+ courts
- Headquarters: 4718 Wipprecht Street; Houston, Texas 77026; United States

The Order of Calanthe, originally titled the Independent Order of Calanthe, is a fraternal benefit society for African American women. It was established in Louisiana in 1883 as an auxiliary to the Knights of Pythias of North America, South America, Europe, Asia, Africa and Australia. Calanthe was the wife of Pythias in the Greek legend Damon and Pythias.

== History ==
The Order of Calanthe, originally titled the Independent Order of Calanthe, is a fraternal benefit society for African American women. It was established in Louisiana in 1883 as an auxiliary to the Knights of Pythias of North America, South America, Europe, Asia, Africa and Australia. Its purpose was promoting "the social, intellectual, and moral welfare of its members and the community at large".

=== Courts ===
The Grand Court of Florida was established in 1887. By 1888, there were 33 courts in the United States.

The Grand Court Order of Calanthe of Texas, established on May 30, 1897, was a highly successful branch and is commemorated with a historical marker. Susie H. Norris, who helped organize the Grand Court of Texas, was elected the first Grand Worthy Counsellor of the organization and served from 1898 to 1902. In 1902, America D. Key led the organization until 1925 and dramatically expanded the organization making it one of the largest Grand Courts in the United States. After Key died in 1925, Fannie McPherson led from 1925 to 1934 and P. E. Davis from 1934 to 1944.

The University of Texas San Antonio has a photograph of a parade of members. An office building for the group was built at 2411 Dowling Street in Houston, Texas. The organization has been sued over benefits. In 2018, the Texas court became the Calanthe Historical Society.

The Grand Court of Calanthe, Jurisdiction of Michigan, was founded in September 1922 in Detroit, Michigan with Anna T. Hyde as the first Grand Worthy Counsellor. During the 1920s, Texas grew to become one of the largest courts in the United States. However, many fraternal and benefit societies struggled to survive the Great Depression. As of 2025, the Grand Court of Calanthe Texas is still active. Its headquarters are in Houston, Texas.

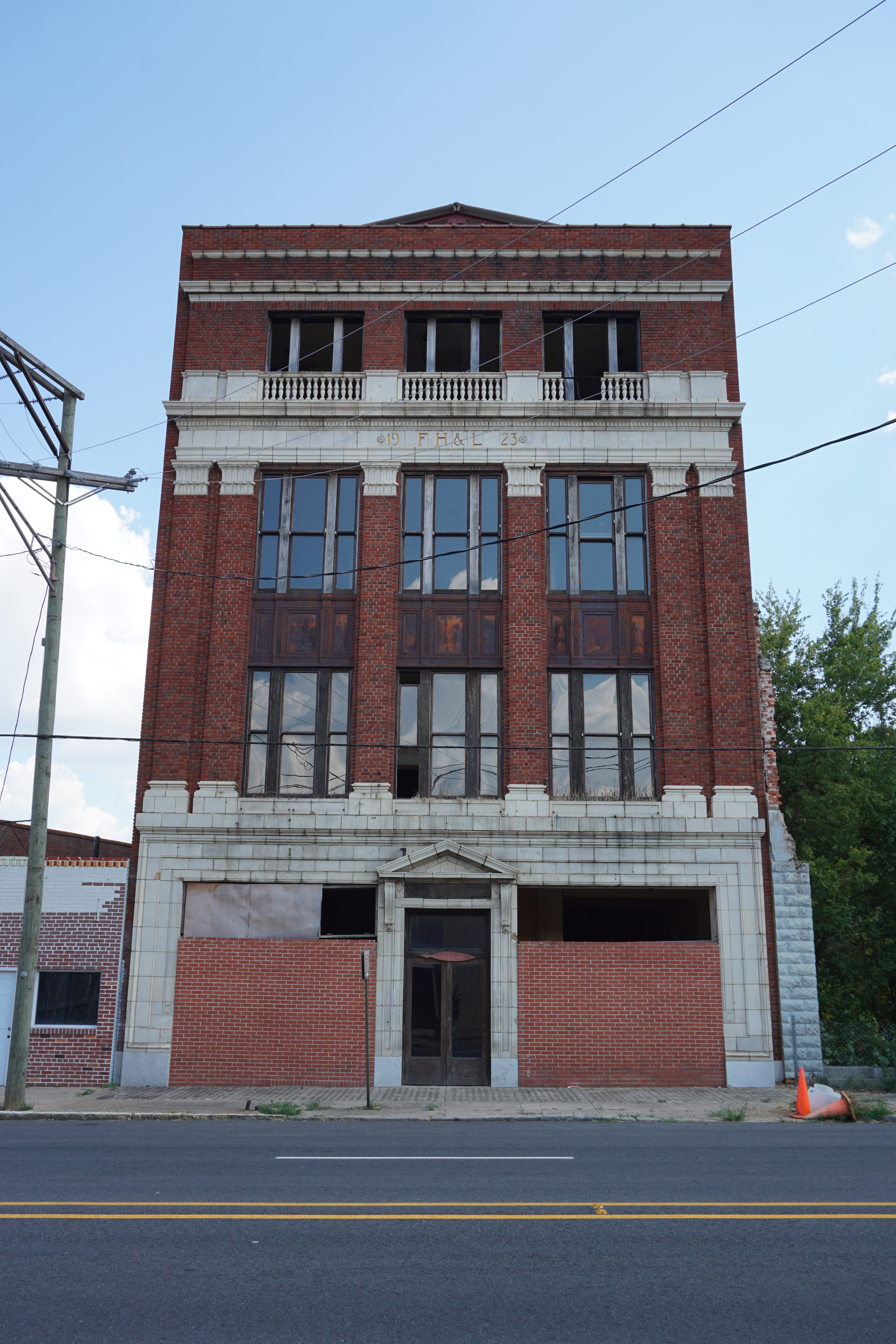
Calanthean Temple in Shreveport

== Symbols ==
The organization was named for Calanthe, the wife of Pythias in the Greek legend Damon and Pythias. The organization's motto is "Fidelity, Harmony, and Love." The Order of Calanthe is known for its distinctive fez hats. Each degree has its unique symbols, teachings, and rituals.

== Activities ==
The organization provided life insurance, sick, and death benefits. Members provide community service, support charities, and advocate for social justice and civil rights.

== Membership ==
Membership in the Order of Calanthe was originally opened to family members of the Knights but was later widened to any woman sponsored by a Knight. The order's members are ranked by several degrees.

== Buildings ==
The Calanthean Temple in Shreveport was built by the group in 1923 and is part of the St. Paul's Bottoms historic district.

== Notable members ==
- Fannie Emanuel, educator, businesswoman, and clubwoman
- Mame Stewart Josenberger, educator, businesswoman, and clubwoman
- Rebecca H. Lester, businesswoman, social activist and clubwoman
- Vivian Osborne Marsh, activist and club woman
- Carrie A. Tuggle, educator, philanthropist, and social activist
