= Sylvanie Williams =

American educator and clubwoman

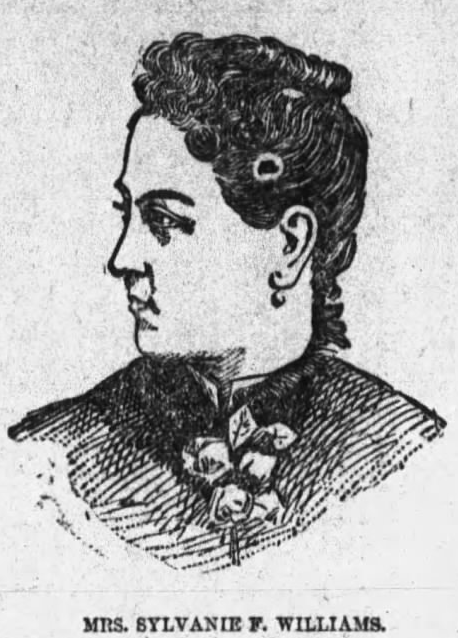
Sylvanie F. Williams, from an 1896 newspaper.

Sylvanie Francoz Williams (died August 12, 1921) was an American educator and clubwoman based in New Orleans, Louisiana, USA.

== Early life ==
Sylvanie Francoz was born in New Orleans, the daughter of François Francoz and Sarah Francoz. The date of her birth varies in sources, from 1847 to 1855; her obituary places her birthdate around 1849. She trained as a teacher at Peabody Normal School.

== Career ==
Sylvanie F. Williams worked as a school administrator, principal of the Fisk School Girls' Department from 1883 to 1896, and of the Thomy Lafon School from 1896 to 1921. The latter school was burned down during rioting in 1900, but rebuilt under her leadership. Among the students under her care were A. P. Tureaud, who became a prominent civil rights lawyer. Williams prepared a report on the educational, economic, and cultural conditions of black residents of New Orleans, to be presented at the World's Columbian Exposition in Chicago in 1893.

Williams was founder and president of the Phillis Wheatley Club, a prominent organization for black women in New Orleans. The club sponsored a nursing school, a hospital, and a free clinic for African-Americans in New Orleans; they also conducted sewing bees to make clothing for orphans. She was also active in creating the first public playground for African-American children in New Orleans. A writer in her lifetime called Sylvanie Williams "a fine example of the resourcefulness and noble influence that a cultivated woman can and will give to the uplift of her race." She was a vice-president of the National Association of Colored Women's Clubs (NACW) when it was founded in 1896.

Williams supported women's suffrage, including black women's suffrage. In 1903 she attempted to attend the annual meeting of the National American Women's Suffrage Association (NAWSA), when it was held in New Orleans, but was barred because of her race. Instead, Williams welcomed a visit to the Phillis Wheatley Club from white suffrage leader Susan B. Anthony, and she spoke with Anthony about the place of black women in the suffrage movement.

== Personal life and legacy ==
Sylvanie Francoz was married to Connecticut-born musician and educator Arthur P. Williams. She was widowed when he died in 1920. She died in 1921, aged about 72 years. A New Orleans elementary school is named for Sylvanie Williams.
