= International Council of Women of the Darker Races =

American organization for black women

The International Council of Women of the Darker Races (ICWDR) was an organization for black women based in the United States and headed by Margaret Murray Washington. In existence from 1922 to 1940, the ICWDR was "the first autonomous international organization among African American women".

== History ==
The International Council of Women of the Darker Races was formed after the 1922 meeting of the NACW in Richmond, Virginia. Margaret Murray Washington appears to have had the idea of such an organization in mind for some time. At the ICWDR's founding meeting, Washington was elected president. Other officers appointed were Mary Church Terrell, Addie Hunton, Elizabeth Carter, Charlotte Hawkins Brown, Mary S. Josenberger, Nannie Burroughs, Lugenia Burns Hope, Addie Dickerson and Emily Williams. Adelaide Casely Hayford, visiting from Sierra Leone, was also a founding member.

The ICWDR initially concentrated on education, developing a program of black literature and history, and supporting Casely Hayford's school in Sierra Leone. After Washington died in 1925, Addie Hunton became president. In 1928 she was succeeded by Addie Dickerson of Philadelphia. After Dickerson died in 1940, the ICWDR did not survive her.
