= James Tilghman =

American politician (1716–1793)

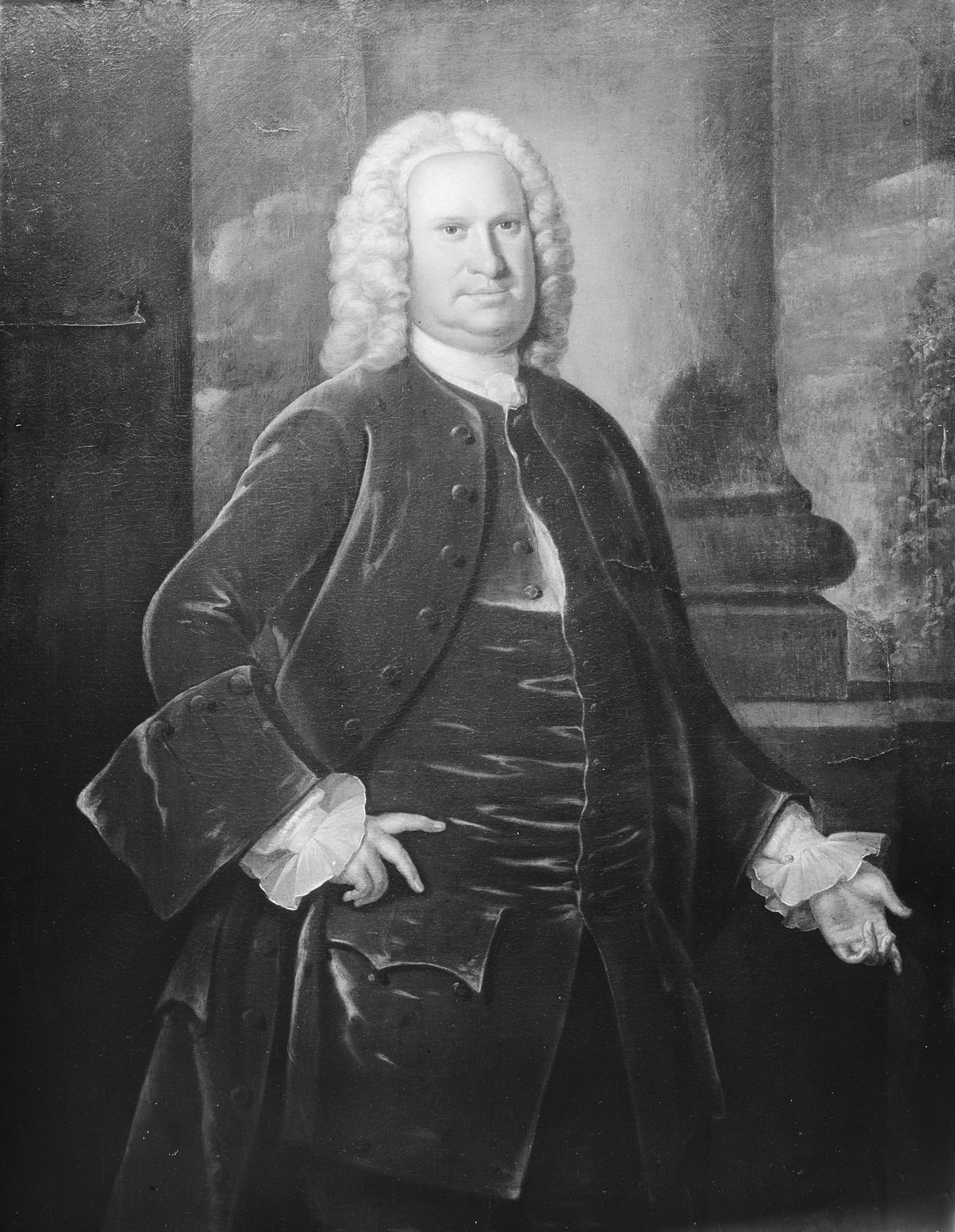
- Born: 1716
- Died: 1793
- Father: Richard Tilghman

James Tilghman (1716–1793) was a prominent lawyer and public servant in colonial Maryland and Pennsylvania.

== Biography ==
Coat of Arms of James Tilghman

The fourth son of Colonel Richard Tilghman and Anna Maria Lloyd, he was born at his family's estate, the Hermitage, on the Chester River in Talbot County on Maryland's Eastern Shore.

=== Early life ===
After studying law, Tilghman began his practice in Annapolis and in 1743 married Anne Francis (1727–1771), daughter of Tench Francis (Sr.).

About 1760 Tilghman moved to Philadelphia, where he held many positions of public service, including Secretary of the Land Office of Pennsylvania (appointed by John Penn in 1765), Philadelphia City Councilman (1764), and member of the Pennsylvania Provincial Council (1767).

During 1768 he was elected to the American Philosophical Society as a member.

At the outbreak of the American Revolution, Tilghman at first favored compromise between England and the colonies; while he called for a repeal of the Intolerable Acts, which was so abhorred by colonists, he at the same time denounced the Boston Tea Party. He was regarded, however, as a Loyalist and was placed under arrest by Pennsylvania state authorities until 1778.

Tilghman was a trustee of the College of Philadelphia (now the University of Pennsylvania) from 1775 to 1788, when he resigned.

Tilghman's youngest brother was Matthew Tilghman, a delegate to the First and Second Continental Congresses.

=== Marriage and family ===
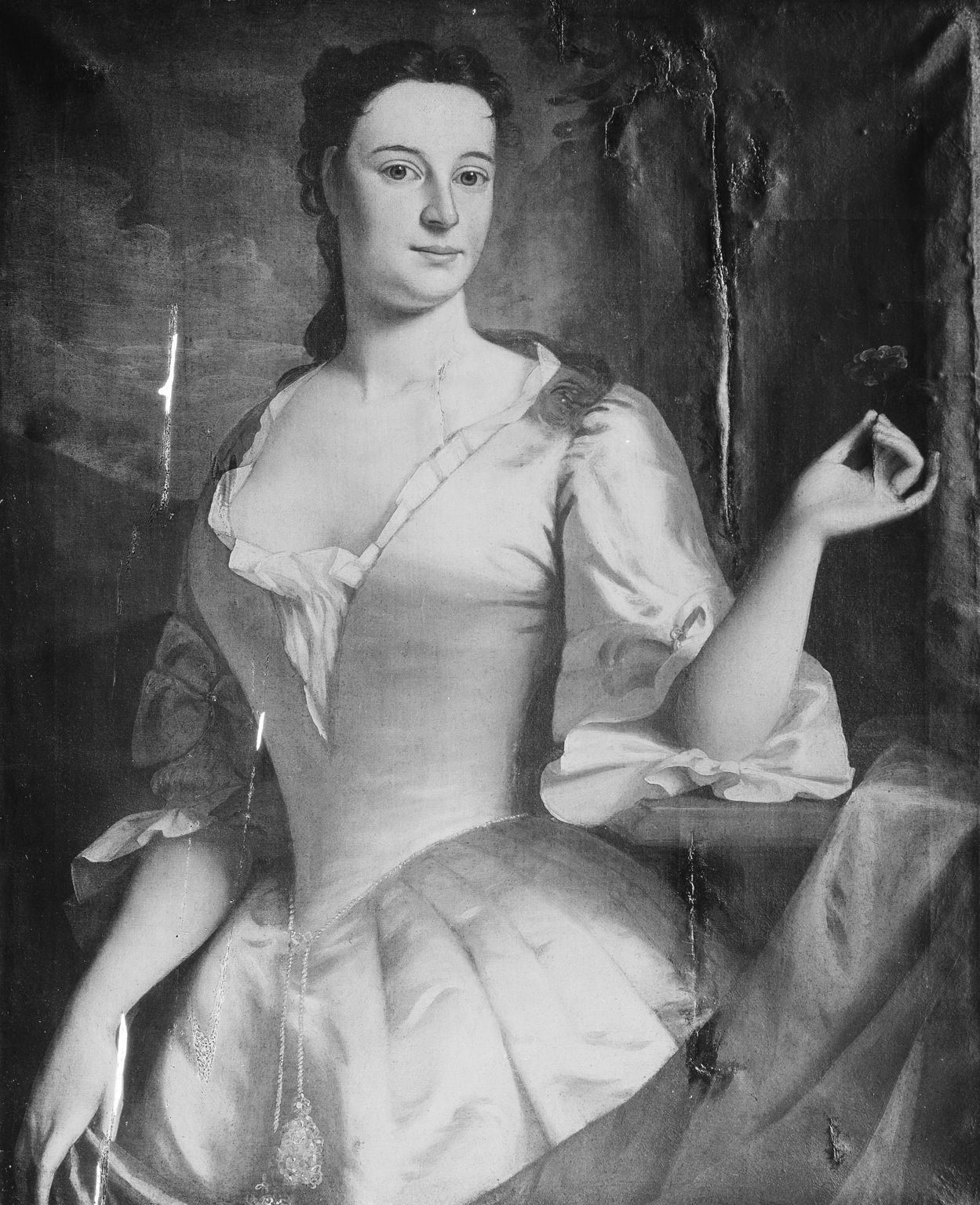
Anne Francis Tilghman

In 1743 he married Anne Francis (1727–1771), daughter of Tench Francis (Sr.) They had two sons:

- Tench Tilghman (1744 – 1786), aide-de-camp to George Washington during the American Revolution.
- William Tilghman (1756 – 1827), who became chief justice of Pennsylvania in 1806.

James Tilghman died at his family home in Chestertown, Kent County, Maryland, in 1793.
