= George Tilghman =

George Hammond Tilghman (September 14, 1896 – 1943) was a teacher who served as the headmaster at the Morristown School (now Morristown-Beard School), a private preparatory school in Morristown, New Jersey, for 13 years (1926–1939). Tilghman succeeded Arthur Pierce Butler, one of the school's three founders. During his tenure as headmaster, Tilghman guided Morristown School through a lengthy period of financial turbulence for the school marked by the stock market crash of 1929 and the Great Depression. He also served as head coach of the ice hockey team. Morristown-Beard School awarded Tilghman its Distinguished Alumni Award posthumously in 2010.

== Early life, education, and first military service ==
Tilghman was born in Johannesburg, South Africa on September 14, 1896, to parents Henry Ashe Tilghman and Alice Tennyson Merry. His father, Henry, worked as a mining engineer for Cecil Rhodes. After attending the Sillig School in Vevey, Switzerland for five years, Tilghman completed his high school education at the Morristown School (now Morristown-Beard School) in Morristown, New Jersey in 1915. He then studied at Harvard University in Cambridge, Massachusetts between 1915 and 1917 and played on the varsity soccer and cross country teams. Tilghman left Harvard in April 1917 to serve as a lieutenant in the U.S. Army's Coast Artillery Corps for two years.

Returning to Harvard in 1919, Tilghman finished his course of study and graduated with a bachelor's degree in chemistry in 1920. Later that year, he joined the faculty of the Morristown School as a chemistry teacher. While teaching full-time, Tilghman completed a master's degree in chemical engineering at Columbia University in Manhattan in 1927.

== Administrative innovation ==
Tilghman adopted an innovative approach to the administration and educational mission of Morristown School. He created a self-help system modeled after the Kent School in Connecticut under which students engaged in service experiences to improve their self-reliance. Students waited on dining room tables, made their own beds, and engaged in supervised activities to facilitate the physical maintenance and daily operations of the school. Simultaneously, Tilghman introduced curriculum advancements that integrated greater lessons in culture and business. He also reorganized the student government and established the school's first alumni magazine (The Morristown School News).

== Hockey team's barnstorming tour of Europe ==
In 1933, Tilghman took the Morristown School hockey team on a barnstorming tour of Europe during winter vacation, a novel experience for a high school team at the time. Experimenting with the tour, Tilghman sought to bolster the international exposure of his student-athletes. Morristown School's hockey team competed against club and school teams from France, Germany, and Switzerland. William Pène du Bois, who went on to earn the Newberry Award as a children's writer, starred as the team's goaltender. Du Bois' experiences in goal influenced the creation of his 1967 story Porko von Popbutton about a boy who accidentally ends up playing goaltender for his school hockey team.

The Morristown School hockey team embarked on their journey on the Berengaria, a massive ocean liner run by the British Cunard Line that surpassed the RMS Titanic by 24 feet. Setting out on December 16, they received a personal message of good luck from U.S. President Franklin D. Roosevelt: "The President sends them [the players] his best wishes for their success in this new field of competition, and wishes them to know of his conviction that they will live up to the best traditions of American sportsman."

During the trip, Tilghman communicated with the Morristown School by cable to share the team's accomplishments. They had a luncheon in England before returning to the U.S. on January 9, 1934, via the RMS Aquitania, a Cunard Line ocean liner that served in both World Wars as a troop ship. Speaking about the team's performance during the trip, Tilghman noted, "The team did very well, especially when consideration is given to the fact that it played eight games in seven days and had to take long and tiring trips. The team learned a lot of hockey and should give a good account of itself during the remainder of the season."

== Hockey team's annual game at Madison Square Garden ==
Tilghman also helped establish an annual holiday game between the ice hockey teams of Morristown School and Kent School. The two schools competed against each other at Madison Square Garden in New York City between 1928 and 1932. They played the first of these rival games just two years after the New York Rangers began play in the National Hockey League. Starting in 1929, Morristown School and Kent School competed for the Ranger Trophy donated by Colonel John S. Hammond, the first president of the Rangers. They switched the venue of their annual rivalry game to West Point's college hockey arena for the games played between 1933 and 1935. .

== Joint resolution against recruiting of athletes ==
In 1939, Tilghman and his assistant headmaster, Theodore Mayhew, hosted a group of 10 headmasters concerned about the practice of recruiting high school athletes. The schools signed a joint resolution that emphasized four points:

- Opposition to recruiting in any form
- Intention to make no special efforts to attract athletes to the schools
- Opposition to athletic-specific tuition discounts
- Subordination of athletics to scholastic work

The ten headmasters who signed the resolution represented Carteret Academy, the Kingsley School, Montclair Academy, Morristown School, Newark Academy, the Newman School, the Pingry School, Rutgers Preparatory School, Stevens-Hoboken Academy, and the Wardlaw School.

== Military service during World War II ==
After Tilghman retired as headmaster of Morristown School in 1939, he joined the U.S. Navy. Tilghman received an initial commission of lieutenant commander in 1940 and served in the color guard for Governor Herbert H. Lehman's trip to the officer training camp in Plattsburgh, New York. That spring, Tilghman delivered the keynote address at the commencement ceremony at Morristown School.

In 1941, Tilghman received a promotion to commander. He deployed to the Pacific Theatre of World War II two years later. While commanding a U.S. Aircraft carrier service unit in the Gilbert Islands, he died trying to get other sailors of the way of an out of control bomber. The Navy posthumously awarded Tilghman the Legion of Merit in 1944.

== Family ==
Tilghman married Ruth Slocum in the chapel at Fort Monroe in Hampton, Virginia on April 4, 1918. They had six children together: Henry, William, George Jr., Richard, Anne, and Sarah. Taking after his father, Henry served as a lieutenant and then commander in the U.S. Navy. He also served as headmaster of the St. Bernard's School in Gladstone, NJ (now Gill St. Bernard's School).
