= Charles F. Tilghman Jr. =

American publisher (1897–1985)

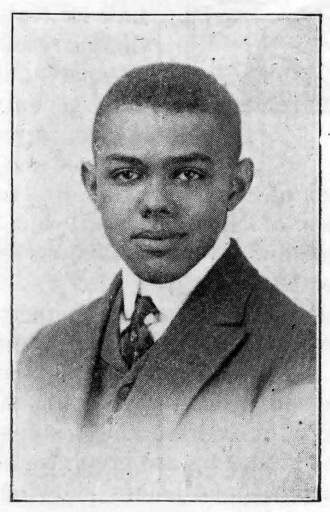
Charles Francis Tilghman Jr., in 1916 or 1917

Charles Francis Tilghman Jr. (March 11, 1897 – December 2, 1985) was an American printer, and the son of social activist Hettie B. Tilghman. His publishing company, Tilghman Press, was the leading West Coast black-owned publishing company from the 1930s to the 1960s.
