= California State Federation of Colored Women's Clubs =

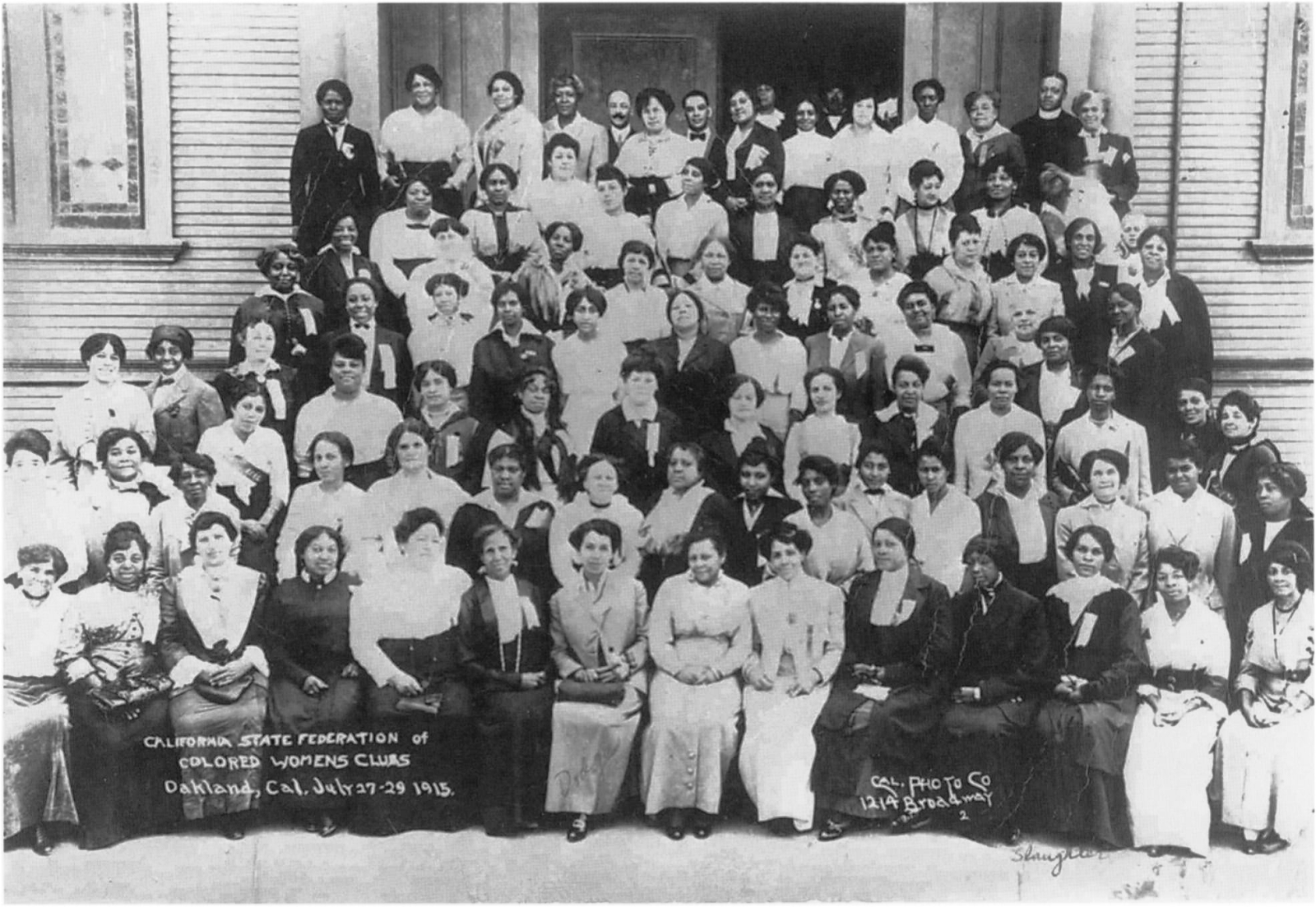
- California State Federation of Colored Women's Clubs meeting in Oakland, California in July 1915.
- Formation: 1906; 120 years ago
- Founder: Eliza Warner
- Founded at: Oakland, California, U.S.
- Type: Woman's club

The California State Federation of Colored Women's Clubs Inc. (CSACWC), was a woman's club formed in 1906 with the mission of serving the needs of California's African-American women and children.

== History ==
In 1906, the California State Federation of Colored Women's Clubs was formed by Mrs. Eliza Warner It was located the 15th Street A.M.E. Church in Oakland, California. Mrs. Warner was the first president. The California State Association of Colored Women's Clubs, Inc., joined the National Association of Colored Women's Clubs (NACWC), in 1908.

The club's motto was "Deeds Not Words". The club's mission was to improve the welfare of African Americans and of providing service to the African-American community. In 1937 the Youth Affiliates was added to the organization.

The CSACWC developed different areas of service, including International Peace and World Affairs, Forestry, and Prison & Parole. The CSACWC also created district associations to oversee the local associates, for example the Northern District included the clubs in the Bay Area of California.

In 1910, Bertha L. Turner of Pasadena, California collected recipes and edited, The Federation Cookbook: A Collection of Tested Recipes Compiled by the Colored Women of the State of California, a cookbook to preserve black culinary identity and celebrate the culinary success of local housewives, with many of the recipes from members of the National Federation of Colored Women.

In 1921, Irene Bell Ruggles, the then president of the California State Federation of Colored Women's Clubs opened the Madame C.J. Walker Home for Girls and Women in San Francisco. The Walker Home was a charitable, community and social services organization for single African American woman new to San Francisco, who were not eligible to use the YWCA.
