= Arthur Pierce Butler =

American school administrator (1866–1953)

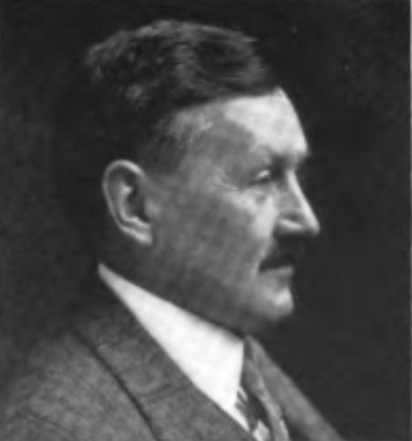
- Born: April 21, 1866; Boston, Massachusetts, US
- Died: December 23, 1953 (aged 87); Southwest Harbor, Maine, US
- Education: Harvard University
- Occupations: Headmaster and teacher
- Employer: Morristown School

Arthur Pierce Butler ( April 21, 1866 – December 23, 1953) was an American educator and school administrator. Butler co-founded the Morristown School (now the Morristown Beard School) in Morristown, New Jersey.

== Early life ==
Butler was born on April 21, 1886 in Boston, Massachusetts. His parents were Frances Elizabeth Lewis (née Pierce) and Edward Knowles Butler. He graduated from the Roxbury Latin School in West Roxbury, Massachusetts, in 1884.

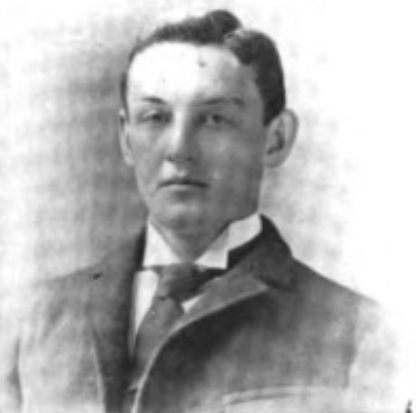
Arthur Pierce Butler at Harvard University, 1888

Butler then received an A.B. degree from Harvard University in 1888. While at Harvard, he was a member of Delta Kappa Epsilon (aka The Dickey Club) and Alpha Delta Phi. He was also elected to the class committee.

== Career ==
Following college, Butler began working for the Boston Woven Hose and Rubber Company in 1888. He was a manager of its branches in San Francisco and in Chicago. After a decline in his health, he went abroad from 1894 to 1896.

Butler began his teaching career as an instructor at St. Bartholomew's School in Morristown, New Jersey in 1898. When the school failed in 1899, Butler and former Harvard University classmates Francis Woodman and Thomas Quincy Brown Jr. purchased the school and reorganized it as the Morristown School (now the Morristown Beard School) as a liberal and progressive preparatory school. He served as the school's associate headmaster and taught history and manual training from 1898 to 1917. He wrote an article "Class Equipment for Teacing History". Butler replaced Woodman as Morristown School's headmaster around 1919 and continued in this capacity until his retirement on July 1, 1926.

Butler served with the Morristown Battalion of the New Jersey Militia Reserve. During World War I, he chaired the organization in Monroe, New Jersey that facilitated the Liberty Loans, war bonds that supported military expenditures. He belonged to the American Historical Association, the History Teachers Association of the Middle States and Maryland, and the Schoolmasters' Association.

== Personal life ==
Butler married Lydia Raquet Farnham of Cambridge, Massachusetts on August 8, 1906. They had two children: Arthur Pierce Butler Jr. and Edwin Farnham Butler.

Butler was a member of the Boston Club, the Harvard Club of Boston, the Harvard Club of New York City, and the New Jersey Club. In Morristown, he belonged to the Shakespeare Club and the Friday Evening Club. He was an honorary member of the Northeast Harbor Fleet. Butler was a Unitarian.

Butler died on December 25, 1953, at the Mt. Desert Hospital in Southwest Harbor, Maine.
