= Morris M. Feuerlicht =

Morris Marcus Feuerlicht (January 15, 1879 – November 30, 1959) was a Hungarian-born American rabbi who mainly ministered in Indianapolis, Indiana.

== Life ==
Feuerlicht was born on January 15, 1879, in Tokaj, Hungary, the son of Jacob Feuerlicht and Kate Deutsch. He immigrated with his parents to America in 1880 and grew up in Chicago and Boston. His father was a rabbi who served as superintendent of the Jewish Home for the Friendless in Chicago.

Feuerlicht attended the Brimmer School in Boston, the University of Cincinnati, and Hebrew Union College in Cincinnati. He was ordained a rabbi from the latter in 1901. He initially served as rabbi of Temple Israel in Lafayette, Indiana. In 1904, he was named associate rabbi of Indianapolis Hebrew Congregation in Indianapolis, under Rabbi Mayer Messing. When Messing retired in 1907, he became the congregation's main rabbi. Shortly after becoming rabbi at Lafayette, he began post-graduate studies on Semitics in the University of Chicago under Emil G. Hirsch. He stopped his studies in 1906, before he began his doctoral thesis, due to the death of the university's president William Rainey Harper and the mounting requirements of his Indianapolis pulpit.

Feuerlicht served as president of the Children's Aid Association of Indianapolis from 1905 to 1922. A member of the Central Conference of American Rabbis, he was its secretary from 1911 to 1913. Following the Great Flood of 1913, he served on the flood relief committee and the committee for the unemployed. During World War I, he was a member of the religious and moral committee of the Council of Defense and the executive committee of the Indianapolis Red Cross, chairman of the local Jewish Welfare Board, a speaker in the seventh national district for the Liberty Loan and Red Cross drives, active in United War Work and War Relief drives, and took charge of activities among Jewish soldiers in Fort Benjamin Harrison, Speedway, and Deaf Mute Institute. He served as president of the State Conference of Charities and Corrections from 1921 to 1922. He edited Chicago paper The Jewish Conservator from 1904 to 1906 and The Indiana Jewish Chronicle from 1921 to 1922. He also wrote "Jewish Charity in Europe" for Charles R. Henderson's "Modern Methods of Charity," "Social Conditions of the Eighth Century, B.C.," and "Isaac M. Wise-Commander."

Feuerlicht was a founder of the Marion County chapter of the American Red Cross as well as the founder and first director of the Indianapolis Family Welfare Society. He served multiple terms as president of the Indiana Library and Historical Board. In 1927, he was a founder of the National Conference of Christians and Jews (later renamed the National Conference for Community and Justice). He was a member of the American Oriental Society, a contributor to the Universal Jewish Encyclopedia, and author of Judaism's Contribution to the Founding of the Republic.

Feuerlicht and Judge George W. Stubbs promoted the Juvenile Justice system throughout Indiana, one of the first in the country. He served on the County Board of Welfare, and was on the State Board of Charities and Corrections from 1920 to 1931, making him the first Jew to serve on the latter. He co-founded the Jewish Federation of Indianapolis in 1904. In the 1920s, he was the Jewish community's main spokesman against the Ku Klux Klan. He debated Clarence Darrow in 1928 and 1929 before large audiences. In 1935, he publicly condemned Nazi Germany and asked the Indiana Pastors’ Conference to oppose Nazi propaganda. He led Jewish services in army camps during World War II. After the war, he was a staunch anti-Zionist. He taught Semitics at the Butler University School of Religion from 1926 to 1951. He retired as rabbi of the Indianapolis Hebrew Congregation in 1946.

Feuerlicht was president of the Indiana State Conference of Social Work in 1926, an executive board member of the Union of American Hebrew Congregations, president of the Hebrew Union College Alumni Association from 1926 to 1928, and a member of the American Institute of Archaeology, the American Sociological Society, and the American Academy for Jewish Studies. In 1909, he married Mildred J. Mayerstein. Their children were Maurice M. J. and Katherine (wife of Mark S. Cohen). Mildred's father Maurice Mayerstein was publisher of the Lafayette Daily Courier.

Feuerlicht died on November 30, 1959. His funeral was held at the Indianapolis Hebrew Congregation. He was buried in the Indianapolis Hebrew Congregation Cemetery.
