= Mary Fink =

American civil servant (1916–2000)

Mary Fink (January 1, 1916 – March 29, 2000) was an American civil servant and activist for Jewish causes.

== Early years ==
Born on New Year's Day 1916, Mary Emajen Lapinska was the first child of Dr. Lawrence Weill Lapinska, a successful dentist, and Mrs. Mary Edythe Lapinska. Fink's younger sister, Betty Mae, was born in 1919. Fink described her childhood as being happy, though not perfect. She confided in her journal that her parents argued frequently. She also wrote about her desire to win the approval of her mother:

I often wonder just how mother really feels about me. God knows I love her as my own and try to do just what she wants but so often little things meet with such discouragement that I hate to try again. I know I'm not the model daughter but when I kind of look around, I don't see any other daughters (real daughters, too) do what I try to do for Mother. Just little things mothers usually appreciate. Gee, how good it would feel to have Mother put her arm around me or give me a little kiss! ... But I guess we are just too different.

— April 18, 1935

Faith was an important aspect of Fink's life. She and her family attended the Indianapolis Hebrew Congregation. Even at an early age, Fink felt strongly about the reverence of going to Temple. On Rosh Hashanah 1934, Fink wrote in her journal "Granny was mad because I would not go [to Temple]. It is funny but I really don't care about going to Temple only as a place to go to show off one's new clothes."

== Education ==
Fink graduated from Shortridge High School in the spring of 1934. After high school, she went on to take courses at Indiana Business College and later attended Westminster College. As a young woman, Fink enjoyed going to dances and attending other social events. She met Lou Fink in March 1935 and the two began dating exclusively shortly thereafter. Mary became Mrs. Louis Fink on July 16, 1937. Louis later owned and operated the Concession Equipment & Supply Company.

== Family ==
The Finks had one child together, a daughter named Lee Ann, born April 8, 1947. Lee Ann graduated from Broad Ripple High School in 1965. She went on to Bradley University in Peoria, Illinois, where she majored in secondary English education. There Lee Ann met and fell in love with David Runkle. The two were married on June 2, 1974.

== Community service ==
Fink took an interest in her community early on, but it was not until after the birth of her daughter that she became a full-time volunteer. Over the span of her life, Fink dedicated more than 50 years to volunteer service and social activism. On those rare occasions when Fink was not volunteering, she enjoyed working in her garden and playing bridge. She died on March 29, 2000, at the age of 84.

== Volunteer work ==
Fink described herself as a "professional volunteer." She was deeply committed to supporting causes that helped build the Jewish community and promoted an atmosphere of social justice. One of the primary organizations Fink was involved with was the Indianapolis Section of the National Council of Jewish Women Inc. She served as president of the organization from 1962 to 1964. Even after her presidency, Fink was deeply involved in the Council. She headed the NCJW Thrift Shop for many years. This was a tremendous responsibility, as the thrift shop is the organization's only means of income. In later years, Fink worked as a historian with the council.

== Opportunity ==
Fink was invited to travel to Washington, D.C., in 1968 as part of a NCJW delegation of 300 women from across the country. Fink was one of four women selected to represent the state of Indiana. On the first day of their three-day trip, the women were briefed on a number of legislative issues, including education and social welfare, by a committee of congressmen – including Indiana's own Senator Birch Bayh. The women also attended a gala tea and luncheon given by first lady Mrs. Claudia Lady Bird Johnson, which was also attended by a number of "Cabinet wives" and other prominent women. Mrs. Johnson spoke to each of the 300 women individually over the course of the event. The highlight of the afternoon was an address by Senator Robert F. Kennedy. Fink told a correspondent for the Indiana Jewish Post:

I was impressed with our meeting in general – but especially with the high caliber of women who attended from all over the country. It was a wonderful opportunity to be briefed in the current issues of which Council is interested and be on the Hill and speak to our legislators and either enlist their help or make them conscious of the issues the Council stands for.

== Religion ==
Fink was also involved with the Jewish Welfare Federation. She was elected as president of the Women's Division of the organization in 1969. Fink was also very instrumental in the creation of the Indiana Jewish Historical Society. She even served as president of the organization in its early years. The JWF Report referred to her as "one of our community's most committed and dedicated workers" in their April 1973 issue. Other organizations to which she donated her time, talents, and resources include:

- Auxiliary of the Bornstein Home for the Aged
- B'nai B'rith Women
- Brandeis Women's Committee
- Children's Asthma Research Institute and Hospital
- Community Service Council of Metropolitan Indianapolis
- Hadassah: The Women's Zionist Organization of America Inc.
- Hoosier Capitol Girl Scout Council (Girl Scouts of the USA)
- Hooverwood Indianapolis Jewish Home Inc.
- Indianapolis Chapter Marion County Assn. of Mental Health
- Indianapolis Hebrew Congregation Temple Sisterhood
- Indianapolis Parent Teacher Association
- Indianapolis Women's Division for Project HOPE
- Israel Bond Committee
- Jewish Community Center Women's Service League
- Jewish Community Relations Council
- League of Women Voters
- The Mayor's Task Force on Aging
- "Meals on Wheels"
- The Urban League
- The Ways and Means Committee
- Women's Committee of Clowes Hall
- Women in Community Service
- The YWCA USA Board

== Awards ==
Her commitment to community service was acknowledged by the many awards Mary Fink received throughout her lifetime. These awards include:

1972 – "Those Special People" Award: Given by the Professional Chapter of Theta Sigma Phi fraternity for outstanding volunteer service to the community.

1973 – David M. Cook Memorial Award: This award honors the memory of the prominent attorney and human rights leader David M. Cook. The recipient of this award is chosen annually by a committee of Jewish Welfare Federation. On receiving the award, Fink said "There are others who have done so much more than I have. I never even gave it a thought ... I'm really thrilled. I looked up to Dave. He was a wonderful person and a friend." She received the award at the annual JCRC meeting on May 16, 1973.

1976 – The Isadore Feibleman Woman of the Year Award: Established in memoriam of Isadore Feibleman, civic leader and past president of the B'nai B'rith organization. Fink was presented with the award at the 20th Annual Awards Dinner at the Indianapolis Lodge #58 of B'nai B'rith.

1976 – Hannah G. Solomon Award: Created in 1965, this award honors Hannah Solomon, the founding member of the National Council of Jewish Women. The award is presented annually to one woman, distinguished for her service in advancing the goals of the NCJW.

1983 – Jr. & Sr. NCJW Award for 50 years of Service

1984 – Liebert J. Mossler Community Service Award

1987 – Josh Chalfie Award for Distinguished Service to the Jewish Family & Children's Services

== Legacy ==
The National Council of Jewish Women created the Mary Fink Merit Scholarship as the organization's highest merit scholarship in her honor. The scholarship is awarded annually to a single senior who is Jewish and displays a "commitment to Jewish values through civic involvement, character, leadership, and scholastic achievement" and plans to enroll as a full-time student in an Indiana college or university.

The Mary L. Fink Trust was established in 2001, naming the Temple Sisterhood of the Indianapolis Hebrew Congregation as beneficiary. The trust is used to help support the organization's volunteer outreach. The Sisterhood in turn honors Fink at the open of their season with the Annual Mary Fink Opening Luncheon. "Mary's memory and commitment to the Women of Reform Judaism lives on through her extraordinary generosity and legacy of volunteerism."
