= Indianapolis Hebrew Congregation =

Reform synagogue in Indianapolis, Indiana, United States

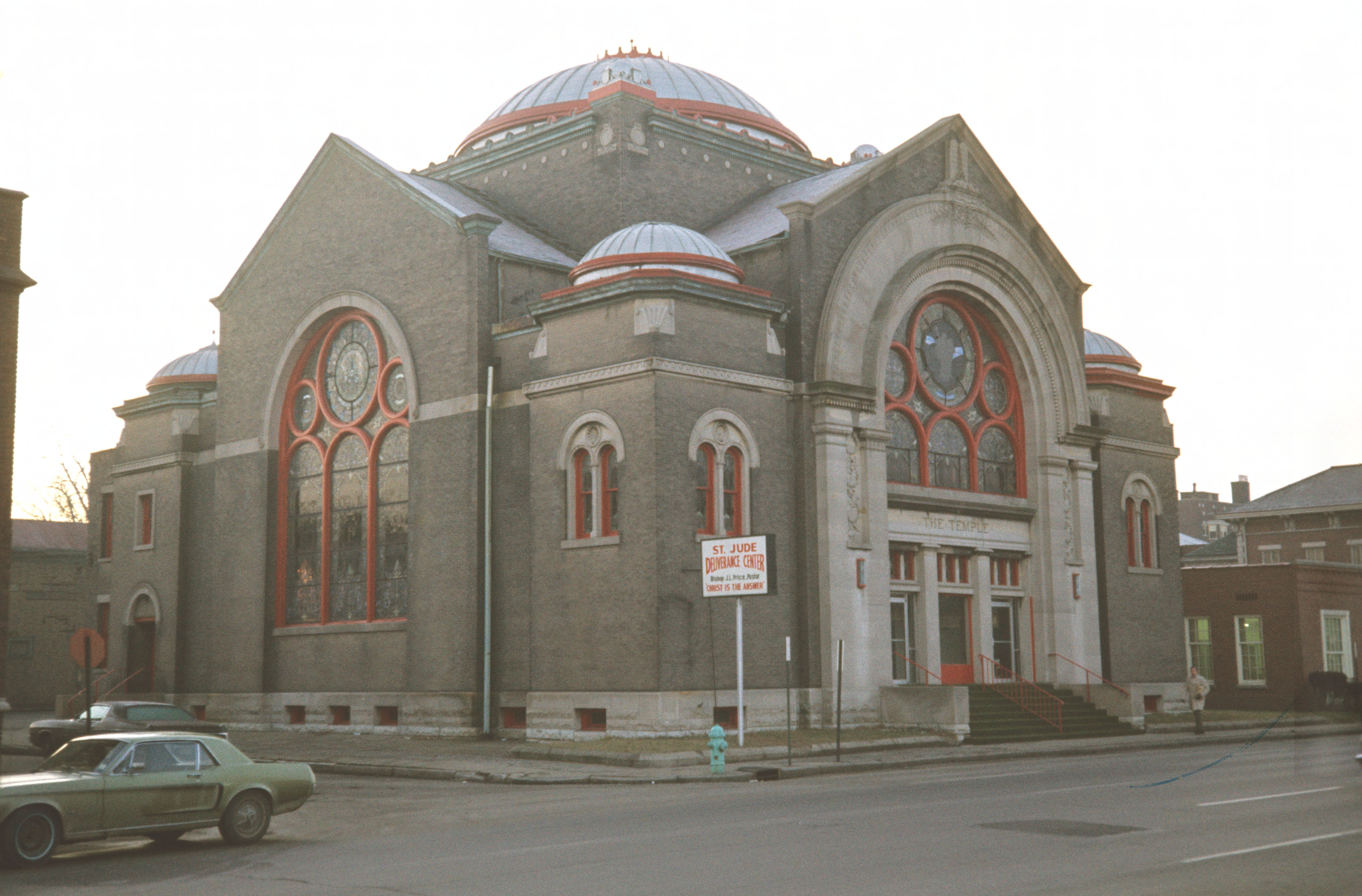

- Location on the northern boundary of Indianapolis, Indiana

Religion
- Affiliation: Reform Judaism
- Ecclesiastical or organizational status: Synagogue
- Leadership: Rabbi Brett Krichiver: Cantor Aviva Marer; Rabbi Jordana Chernow-Reader (Associate); Rabbi Roxanne Shapiro (Education)
- Status: Active

Location
- Location: 6501 North Meridian Street, Indianapolis, Indiana
- Municipality: Indianapolis
- State: Indiana
- Country: United States
- Interactive map of Indianapolis Hebrew Congregation
- Coordinates: 39°52′34″N 86°09′24″W

Architecture
- Architect: Vonnegut & Bohn (1899)
- Type: Synagogue
- Style: Neoclassical (1899); Modernist (1958)
- Established: 1856(as a congregation)
- Completed: 1858 (E. Washington St.); 1868 (E. Market St.); 1899 (Tenth St.); 1958 (Meridian St.)
- Demolished: 1975 (Tenth St.)

Website
- ihcindy.org

The Indianapolis Hebrew Congregation is a Reform Jewish congregation and synagogue located at 6501 North Meridian Street, in Indianapolis, Indiana, in the United States. It is the oldest synagogue in Indianapolis.

== History ==
The congregation was founded in 1856 and erected its first synagogue building in 1858 "in Judah’s Block (East Washington Street), opposite the Court House." This early building was replaced with the building at 435 East Market Street in 1868, and the Tenth Street Temple in 1899. The Tenth Street Temple, designed by Vonnegut & Bohn, architects, was a domed building in an eclectic Neoclassical style, which was burned and demolished in 1975. Rabbi Isaac Meyer Wise led the congregation at that time. The congregation's current building at 6501 North Meridian Street was completed in 1958, in the Modernist style and was renovated in 2011.

== Rabbinical leaders ==
Mayer Messing served as Rabbi from 1869 to his retirement in 1907. Morris M. Feuerlicht was associate of the congregation from 1904 to 1907 and senior rabbi from 1907 to 1946. Rabbi Maurice Davis was known for his work in the Civil Rights Movement. Rabbi Murray Saltzman (1967 to 1978) was also known for his work in the Civil Rights Movement. Rabbi Jonathan Stein, who was Senior Rabbi at the synagogue, is now Senior Rabbi at Temple Shaaray Tefila on New York City's Upper East Side. Rabbi Brett Krichiver is the current Senior Rabbi.

== Notable members ==
- Mary Fink
- Frederick Knefler
- Marc Summers
