= Temple Israel (Lafayette, Indiana) =

Former Reform synagogue and now church, in Lafayette, Indiana, United States

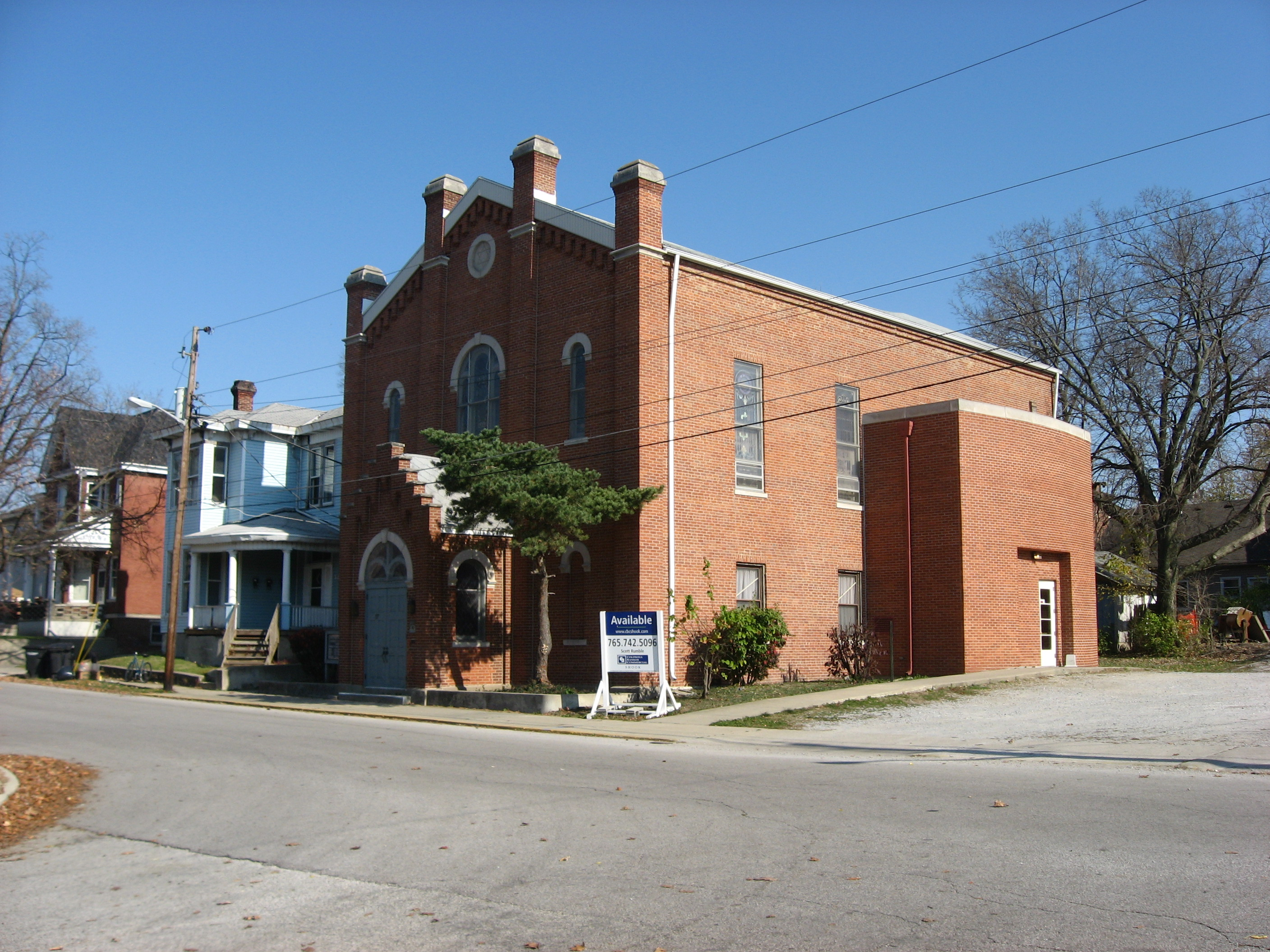
- The former synagogue and church, in 2009

- Location of the former synagogue, now church, in Tippecanoe County, Indiana

Religion
- Affiliation: Reform Judaism (former); Red Cross (former); Unitarianism (former)
- Ecclesiastical or organizational status: Synagogue (1867–1969); Humanitarian (1969–1976); Church (1976–2007)
- Status: Closed (as a synagogue); Repurposed and abandoned

Location
- Location: 17 South 7th Street, Lafayette, Indiana
- Country: United States
- Interactive map of Temple Israel
- Coordinates: 40°25′0″N 86°53′16″W

Architecture
- Type: Synagogue architecture
- Style: Rundbogenstil; Romanesque Revival
- Founder: Ahavas Achim Congregation
- General contractor: Jacob Welschbillig
- Established: 1849 (as a congregation)
- Completed: 1867
- Temple Israel
- U.S. National Register of Historic Places
- Area: less than one acre
- NRHP reference No.: 82000080
- Added to NRHP: February 19, 1982

Temple Israel is a historic former Reform Jewish synagogue, located at Lafayette, Indiana, in the United States. Its 1867 building is one of the oldest synagogue buildings in the United States. Deconsecrated as a synagogue in 1969, the most recent use of the building was as a Unitarian church.

== History ==
The congregation, called Ahavas Achim Congregation, was formed on April 27, 1849, the second Jewish congregation organized in Indiana. In 1874 it became a founding member of the Union of American Hebrew Congregations. The congregation moved to its third and present location on Cumberland Avenue in West Lafayette.

The Temple Israel building of 1866–1867, located at 17 South 7th Street, was renamed as Temple Israel in 1919. It is a two-story Rundbogenstil structure. The building was dedicated by Rabbi Isaac Mayer Wise.

Morris M. Feuerlicht was rabbi of Temple Israel from 1901 to 1904.

The building was placed on the National Register of Historic Places in 1982.

In 1969 the building was sold to the American National Red Cross and was purchased in 1976 by the Unitarian Universalist Fellowship of Greater Lafayette. The UU congregation vacated this location in October 2007.
