= 3rd Liberty Loan Act =

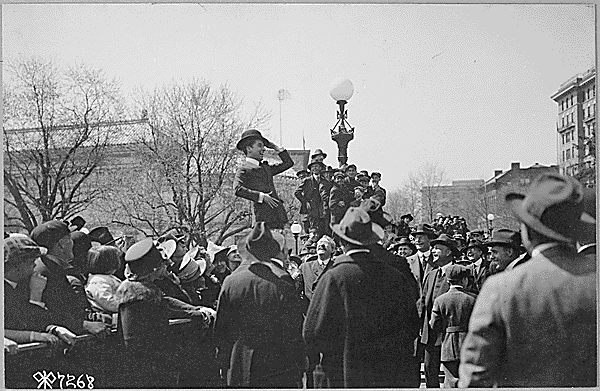
Charlie Chaplin giving a speech in 1918 for the Third Liberty Loan

The Third Liberty Loan Act (Pub. L. 65–120) was a liberty bond sold during World War I that helped cover the war expenses of the United States. In effect, the bonds were loans from citizens to the US Government which would be repaid with interest in the future. There were two previous loan acts, The Liberty Loan Act and The Second Liberty Loan Act, each providing additional money to the US Government to fund the war. The Third Liberty Loan Act was enacted on April 5, 1918. The third act specifically allowed the US government to issue $3 billion worth of war bonds at a rate of 4.5% interest for up to 10 years with an individual aggregate limit of $45,000. The bonds produced by the Third Liberty Loan Act were not redeemable until September 15, 1928.

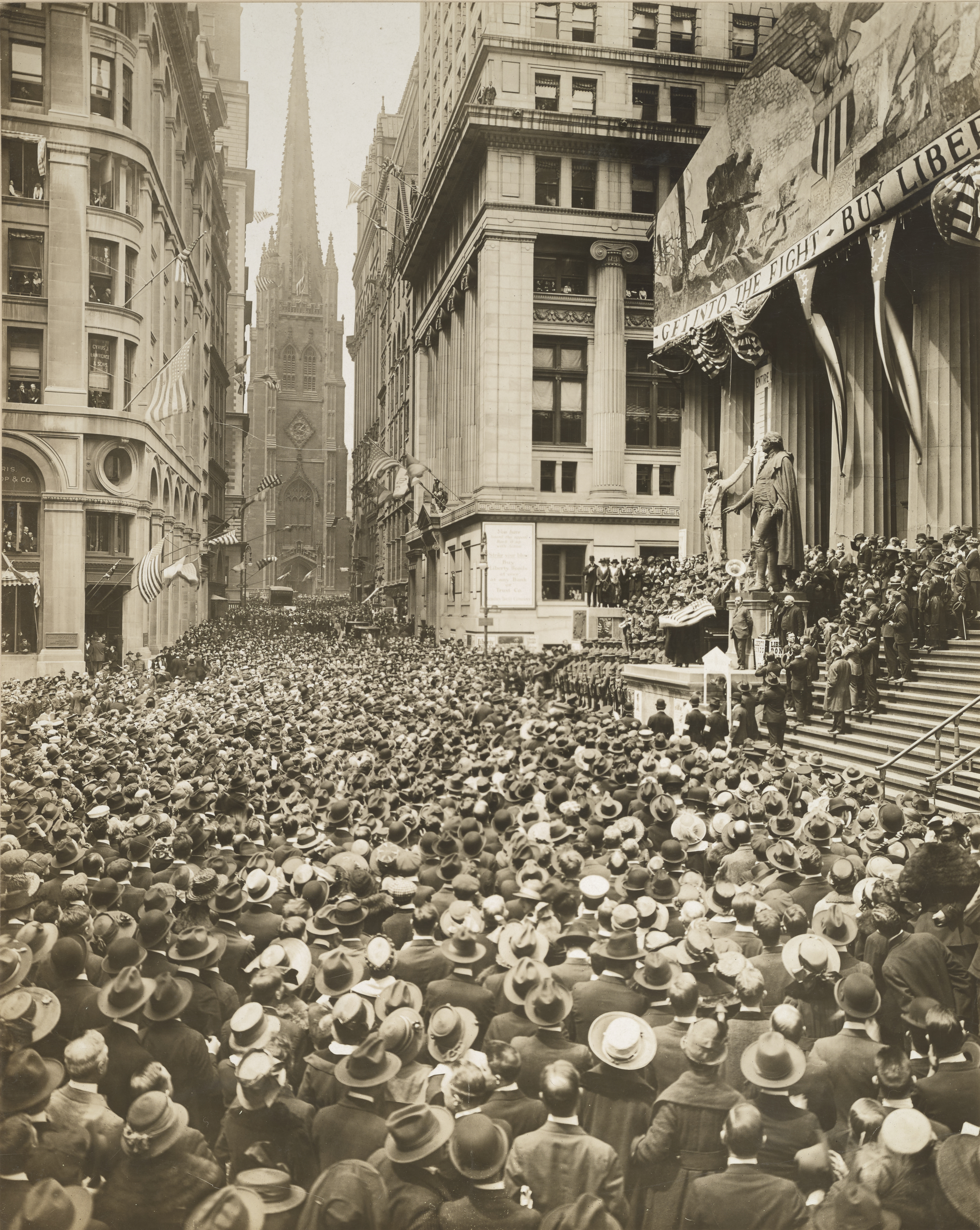
Opera singer Ernestine Schumann-Heink for the Third Liberty Loan Campaign, April 1918 in New York City

The Third Liberty Loan Act was an amendment to the previous two Liberty Loan acts. The first Liberty Loan have been enacted on April 24, 1917, and issued $5 billion in bonds at a 3.5 percent interest rate. However, this loan was not sufficient to support the United States presence in the war. The second act was put into place on October 1, 1917, only a few months after the first. This time the loan allowed for an additional $3 billion in bonds at a 4 percent interest rate. The third loan was still insufficient and a fourth act was created on September 28, 1918, which allowed for an even higher amount - $6 billion at 4.25 percent interest rate.

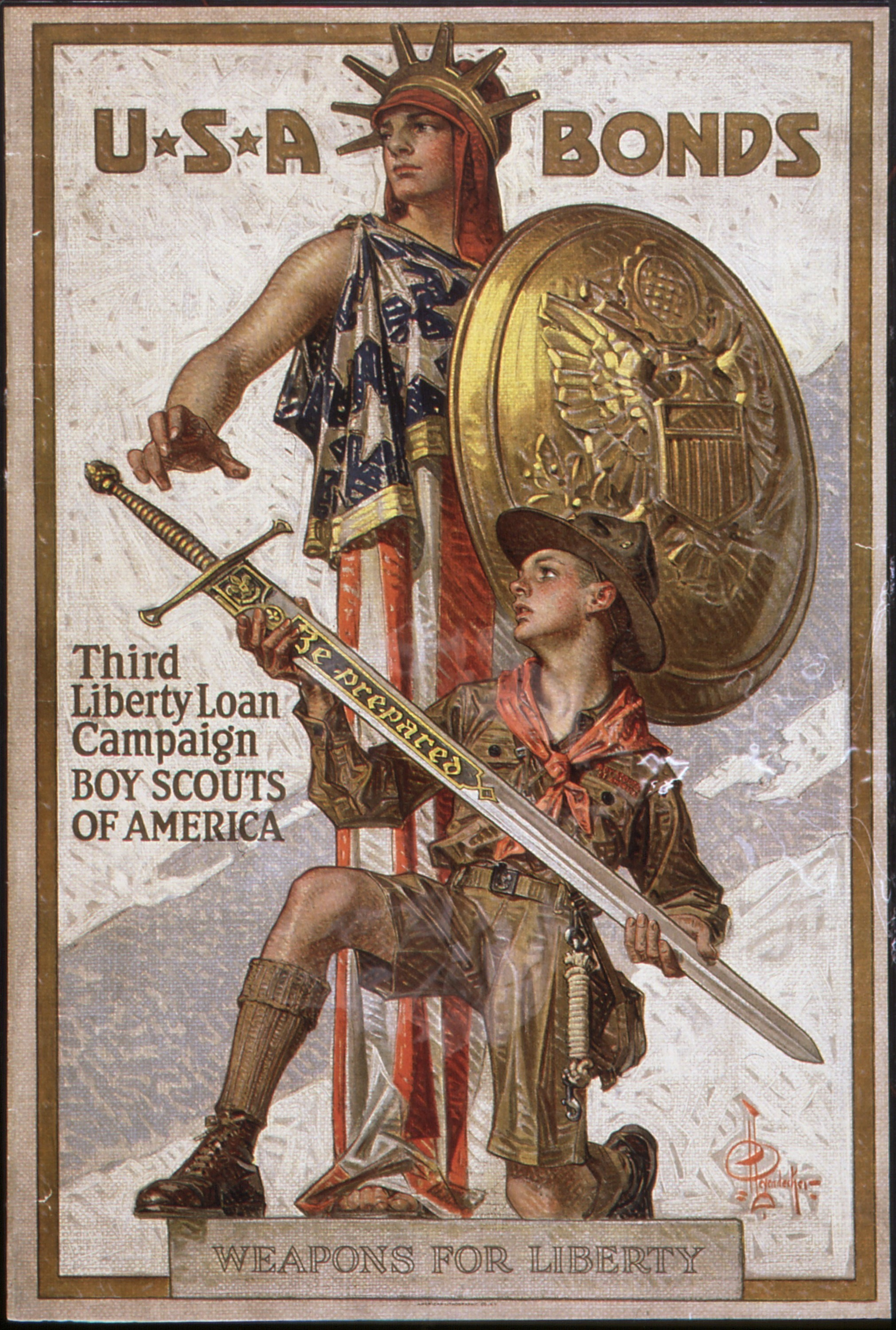
Weapons For Liberty

These bonds were sold primarily by the boy and girl scouts. The most famous of bonds poster depicted a boy scout handing a sword to Lady Liberty that is suited for battle. The scouts ended up selling 2,328,308 liberty bonds between 1917 and 1918. This totaled $354,859,262 that the government owed to the people of the United States and $43,043,698 allocated to the Allied forces.

The expenses covered by these loans included weaponry, medical and surgical supplies, and vehicles.

Though the liberty loans were to be used only to fund the war they are still used to this day to fund matters of extreme cost. The most recent use was in 2001 to offset the cost of rebuilding the areas affected by the terrorist attacks.

== See also ==
- Cost of War
- List of combat vehicles of World War I
- List of infantry weapons of World War I
- Scouting
- War bond
