= Liberty bond =

American war bond sold in World War I

First Liberty Bond Act
- Other short titles: Emergency Loan Act; Liberty Loan Act
- Long title: An Act To authorize an issue of bonds to meet expenditures for the national security and defense, and, for the purpose of assisting in the prosecution of the war, to extend credit to foreign governments, and for other purposes
- Enacted by: the 65th United States Congress
- Effective: April 24, 1917

Citations
- Public law: Public Law 65-3
- Statutes at Large: 40 Stat. 35

Legislative history
- Introduced in the House of Representatives as H.R. 2762 by Claude Kitchin (D‑NC) on April 11, 1917; Committee consideration by House Committee on Ways and Means; Passed the House of Representatives on April 14, 1917 (390–0); Passed the Senate on April 17, 1917 (84–0); Reported by the joint conference committee on April 18 – April 20, 1917; agreed to by the House of Representatives on April 21, 1917 (Voice vote) and by the Senate on April 23, 1917 (Voice vote); Signed into law by President Woodrow Wilson on April 24, 1917

Major amendments
- Second Liberty Bond Act (40 Stat. 288)

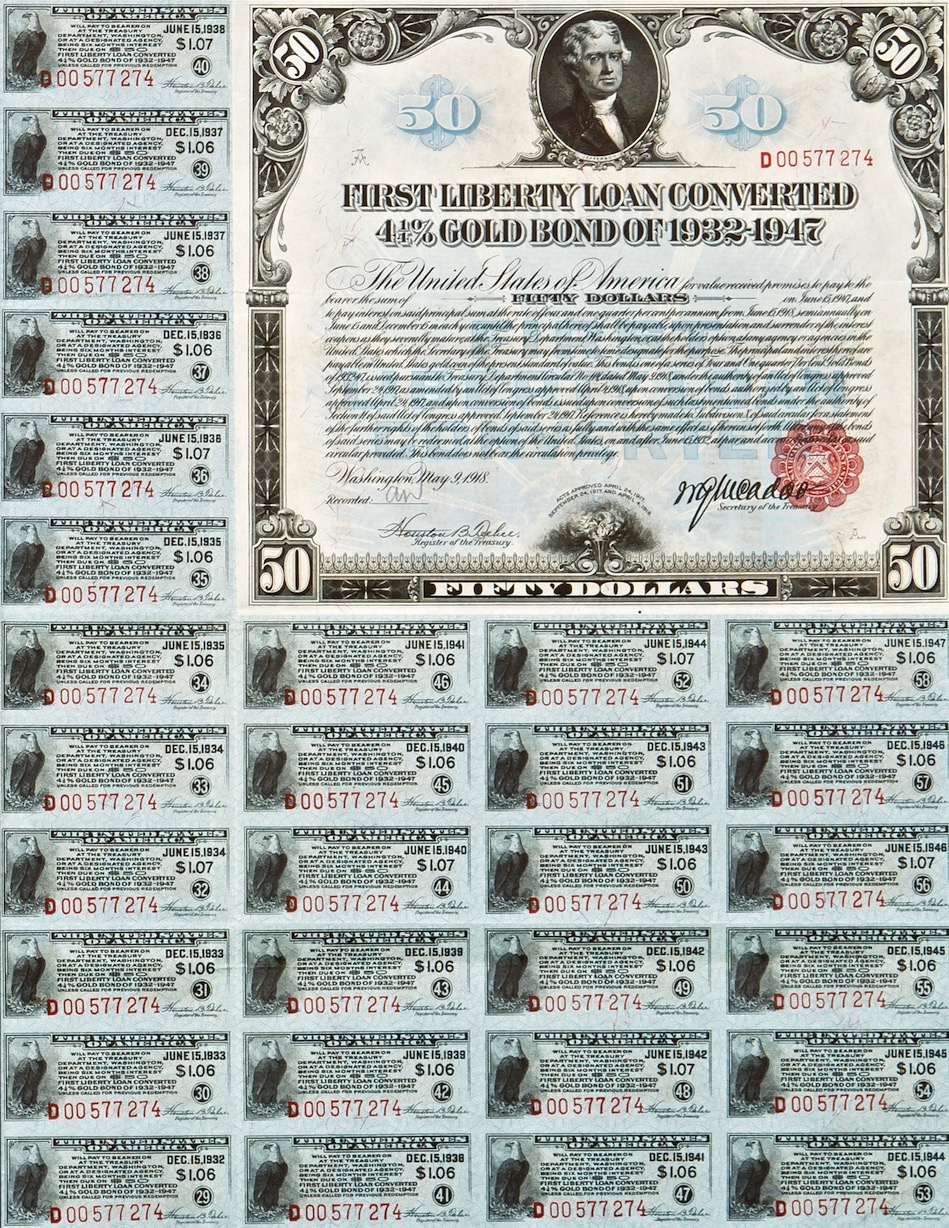
1918 $50 4.25% First Liberty Loan

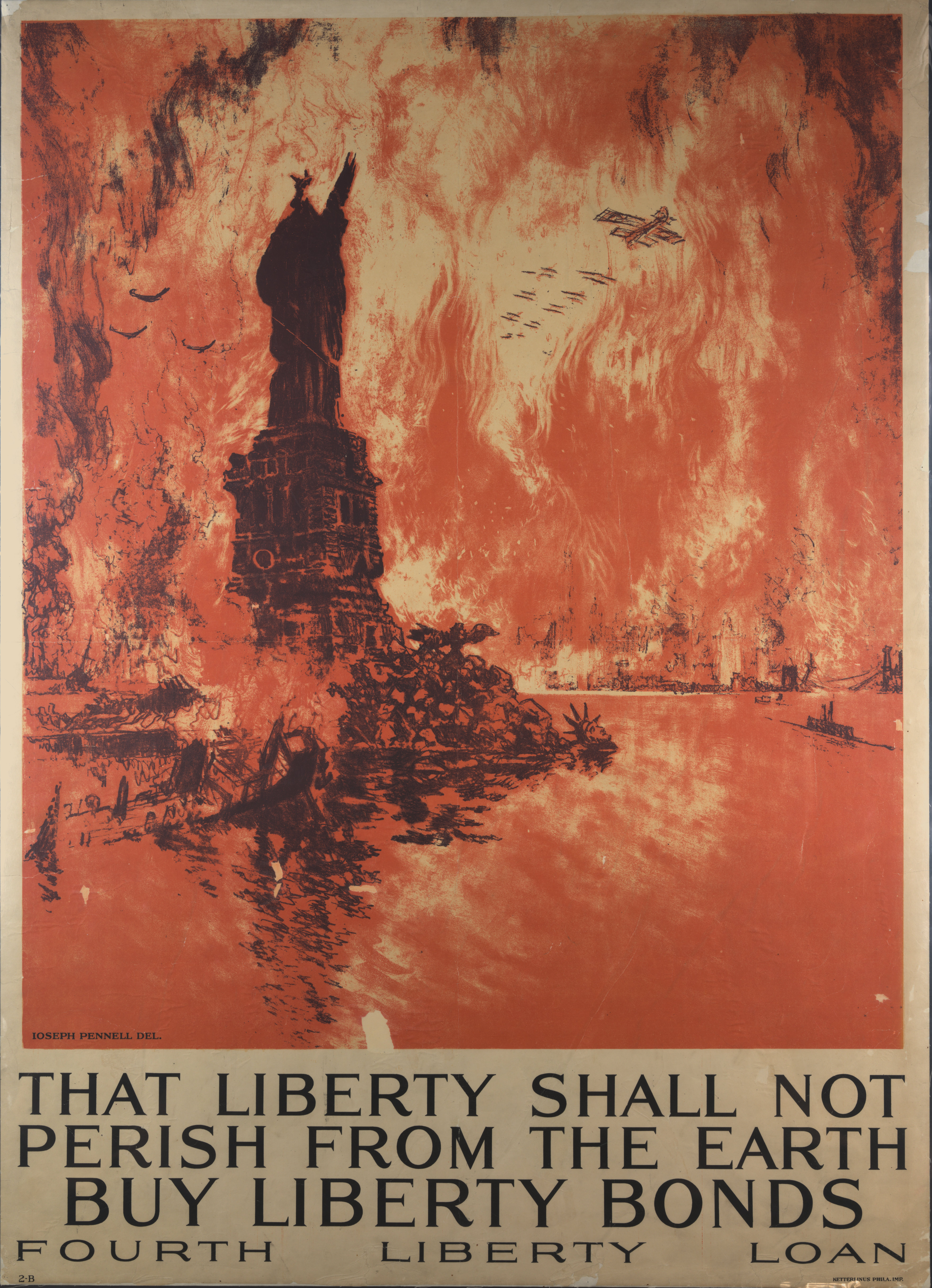
Joseph Pennell's poster That Liberty Shall Not Perish from the Earth (1918)

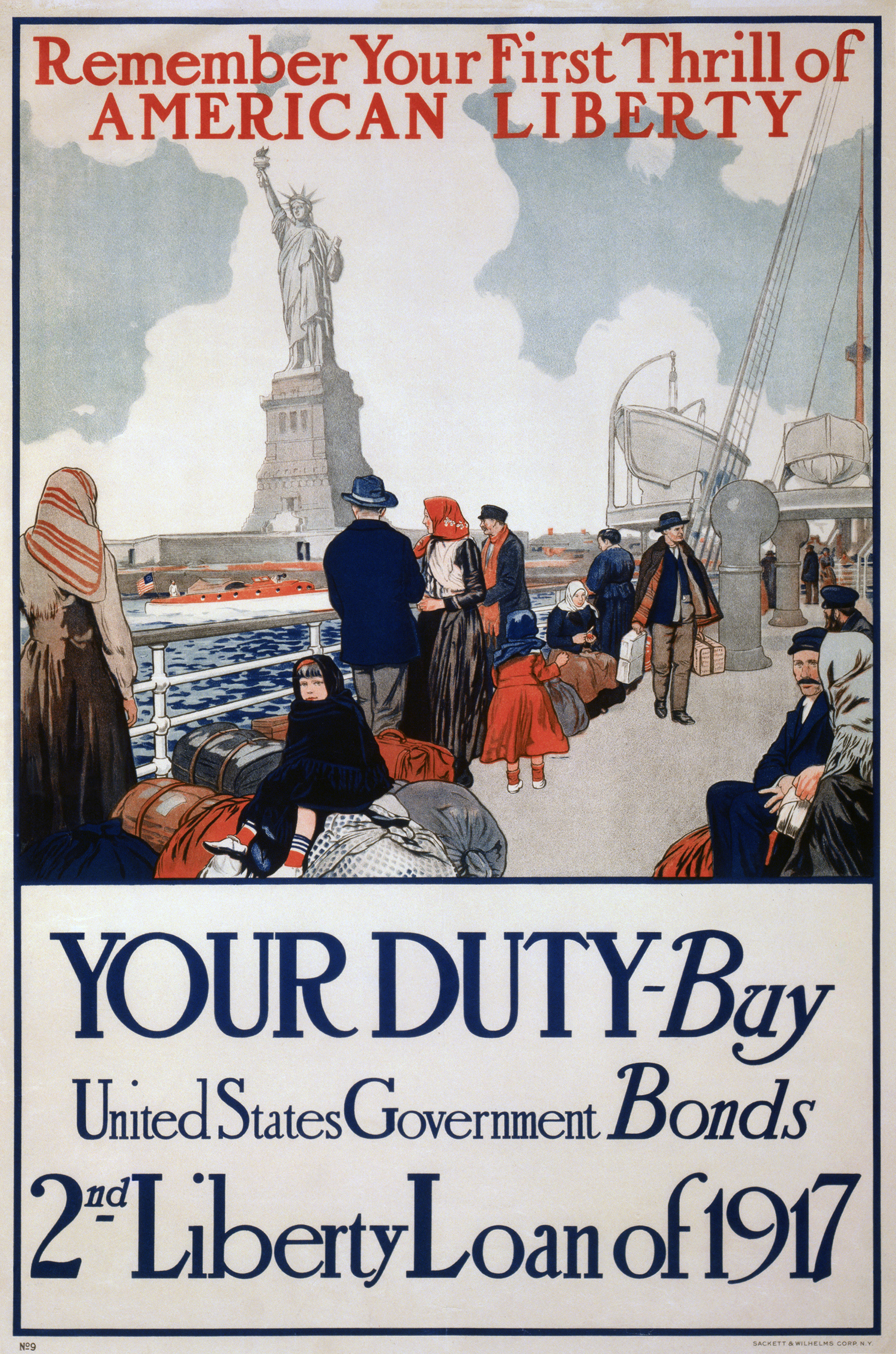
1917 poster using the Statue of Liberty to promote the purchase of bonds

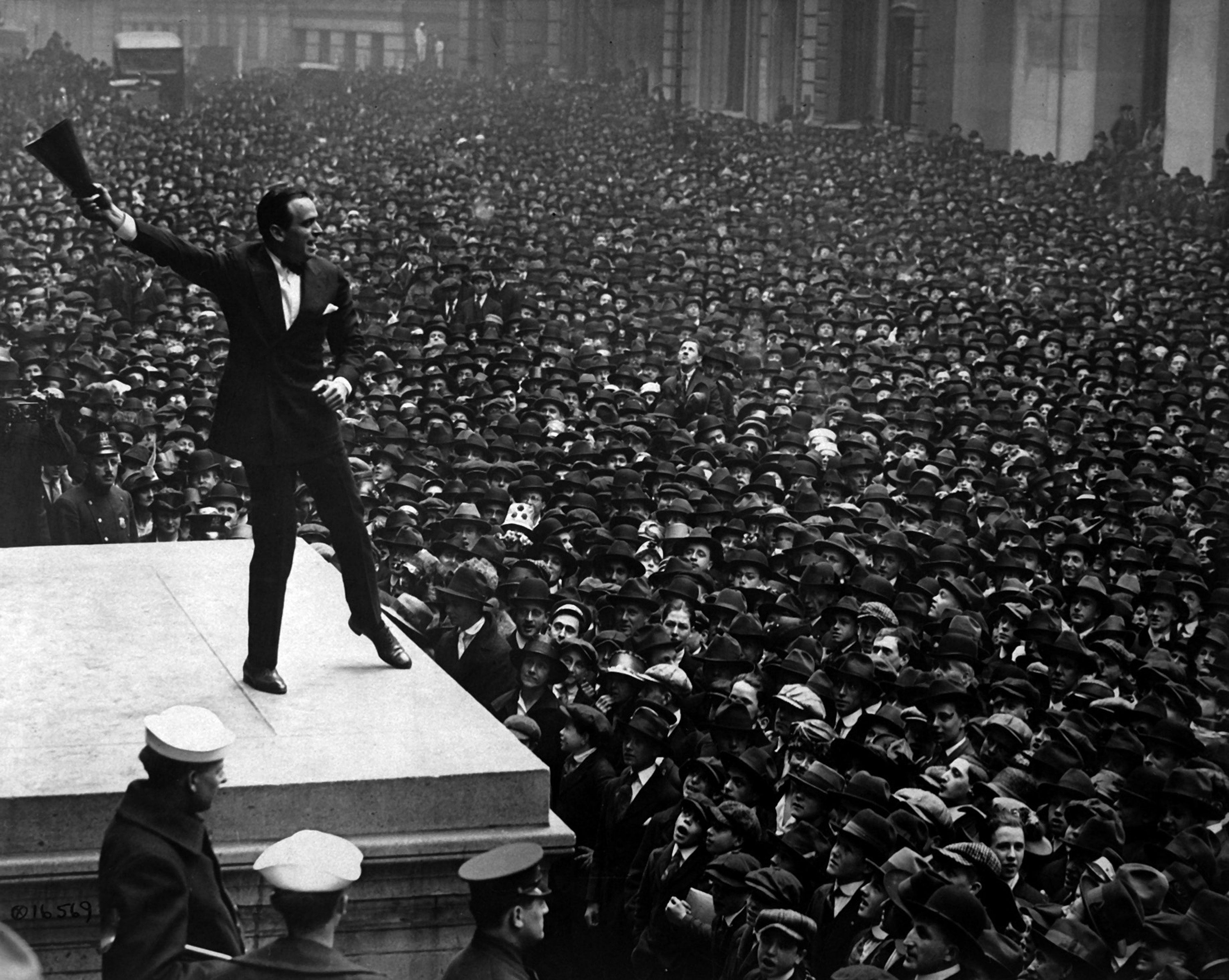
Douglas Fairbanks, movie star, speaking to a large crowd in front of the Sub-Treasury building, New York City, to aid the third Liberty Loan, in April 1918

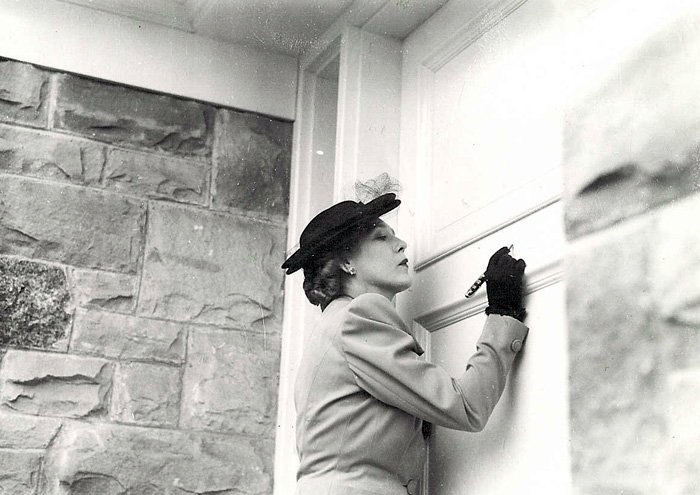
Mary Pickford signing the entrance to the Mary Pickford War Funds bungalow in East York, Canada.

A liberty bond or liberty loan was a war bond that was sold in the United States to support the Allied cause in World War I. Subscribing to the bonds became a symbol of patriotic duty in the United States and introduced the idea of financial securities to many citizens for the first time.

== Liberty Bond issues 1917–1918 ==
There were four issues of Liberty Bonds:

- April 24, 1917: Emergency Loan Act (Pub. L. 65–3) authorizes issue of $1.9 billion in bonds at 3.5 percent.
- October 1, 1917: Second Liberty Loan offers $3.8 billion in bonds at 4 percent
- April 5, 1918: Third Liberty Loan offers $4.1 billion in bonds at 4.15 percent.
- September 28, 1918: Fourth Liberty Loan offers $6.9 billion in bonds at 4.25 percent.

Interest on up to $30,000 in the bonds was tax exempt only for the First Liberty Bond.

	First	Second	Third	Fourth	Victory
Duration	30-year	25-year	10-year	20-year	4-year
Coupon	3 1/2%	4%	4 1/4%		3 3/4 or 4 3/4
Dated	June 15, 1917	Nov 15, 1917	May 9, 1918	Oct 24, 1918	May 20, 1919
First Call Date	June 15, 1932	Nov 15, 1927	not callable	Oct 15, 1933	Jun 15, 1922
Maturity	Jun 15, 1947	Nov 15, 1942	Sep 15, 1928	Oct 15, 1938	May 20, 1923
Subscription	May 14-Jun 15, 1917	Oct 1-27, 1917	Apr 6-May 4, 1918	Sep 28-Oct 19, 1918	Apr 21-May 10, 1919
in billions of dollars
Offered	2.0	3.0	3.0	6.0	4.5
Subscribed	3.0	4.6	4.2	7.0	5.2
Sold	2.0	3.8	4.2	7.0	4.5

== First Liberty Bond Act ==
The Emergency Loan Act established a $5 billion aggregate limit on the amount of government bonds issued at 30 years at 3.5% interest, redeemable by the government after 15 years. It raised $2 billion with 5.5 million people purchasing bonds.

== Second Liberty Bond Act ==
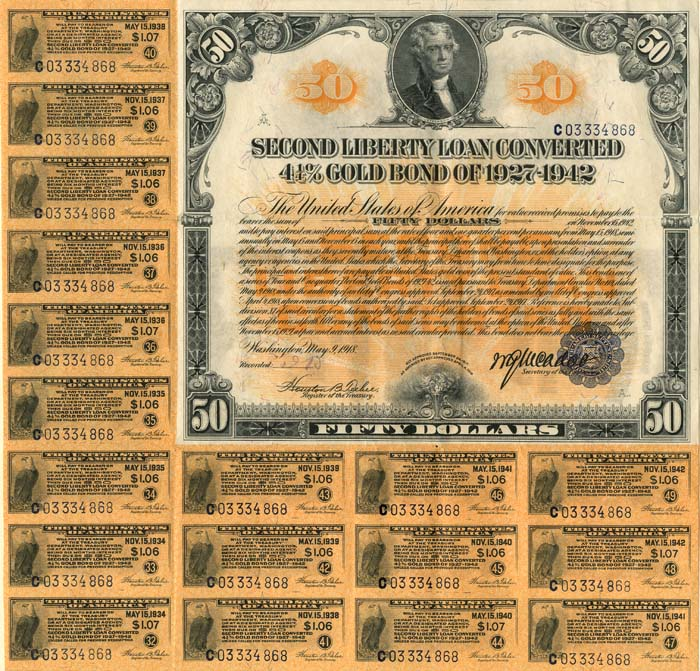
1918 $50 4.25% Second Liberty Loan

The 2nd Liberty Loan Act established a $15 billion aggregate limit on the amount of government bonds issued, therefore allowing $3 billion more offered at 25 years at 4% interest, redeemable after 10 years. The amount of the loan totaled $3.8 billion with 9.4 million people purchasing bonds.

== Sales difficulties and the subsequent campaign ==
The response to the first Liberty Bond was unenthusiastic and although the $2 billion issue reportedly sold out, it probably had to be done below par because the notes traded consistently below par. Various explanations were offered for the weakness of the bonds ranging from German sabotage to the rich not buying the bonds because it would give an appearance of tax dodging (the bonds were exempt from some taxes).

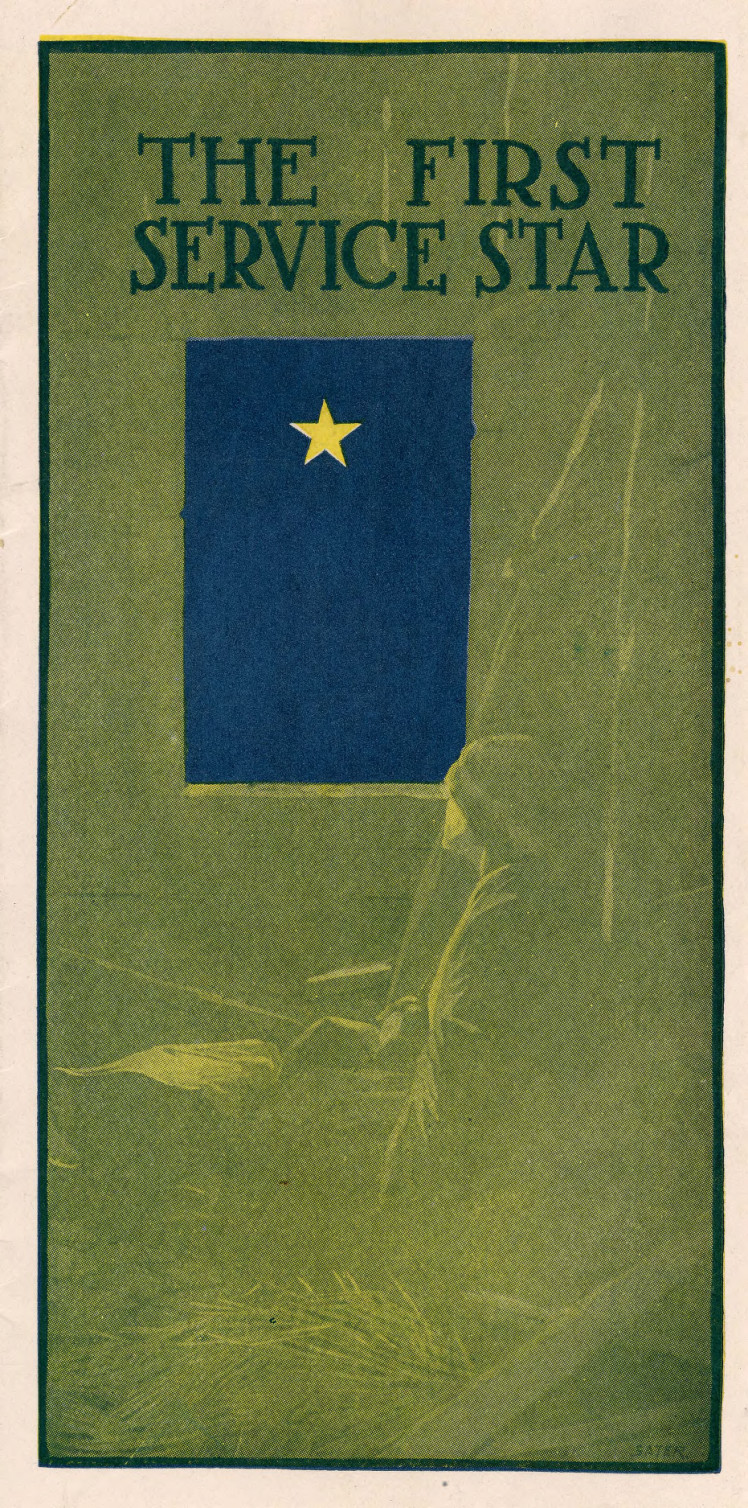
First Service Star pamphlet

A common consensus was that more needed to be done to sell the bonds to small investors and the common man, rather than large concerns. The poor reception of the first issue resulted in a convertible re-issue five months later at the higher interest rate of 4% and with more favorable tax terms. When the new issue arrived it also sold below par, although The New York Times noted that "no Government bonds can sell at par except temporarily and by accident." The subsequent 4.25% bond priced as low as 94 cents upon arrival.

Secretary of the Treasury William Gibbs McAdoo reacted to the sales problems by creating an aggressive campaign to popularize the bonds. The government used a division of the Committee on Public Information called the Four Minute Men to help sell Liberty Bonds and Thrift Stamps. Famous artists helped to make posters and movie and stage stars hosted bond rallies. Harry Lauder, Al Jolson, Elsie Janis, Mary Pickford, Theda Bara, Ethel Barrymore, Marie Dressler, Lillian Gish, Fatty Arbuckle, Mabel Normand, Douglas Fairbanks, and Charlie Chaplin were among the celebrities that made public appearances promoting the idea that purchasing a liberty bond was "the patriotic thing to do" during the era. Chaplin also made a short film, The Bond, at his own expense for the drive. The Boy Scouts and Girl Scouts sold the bonds, using the slogan "Every Scout to Save a Soldier".

Beyond these effective efforts, in 1917 the Aviation Section of the U.S. Army Signal Corps established an elite group of Army pilots assigned to the Liberty Bond campaign. The plan for selling bonds was for the pilots to crisscross the country in their Curtiss JN-4 "Jenny" training aircraft in flights of 3 to 5 aircraft. When they arrived over a town, they would perform aerobatic stunts, and put on mock dog fights for the populace.

After performing their air show, they would land on a road, a golf course, or a pasture nearby. By the time they shut down their engines, most of the townspeople, attracted by their performance, would have gathered. At that point, most people had never seen an airplane, nor ridden in one. Routinely each pilot stood in the rear cockpit of his craft and told the assemblage that every person who purchased a Liberty Bond would be taken for a ride in one of the airplanes. The program raised a substantial amount of money. The methodology developed and practiced by the Army was later followed by numerous entrepreneurial flyers known as barnstormers, who purchased war surplus Jenny airplanes and flew across the country selling airplane rides.

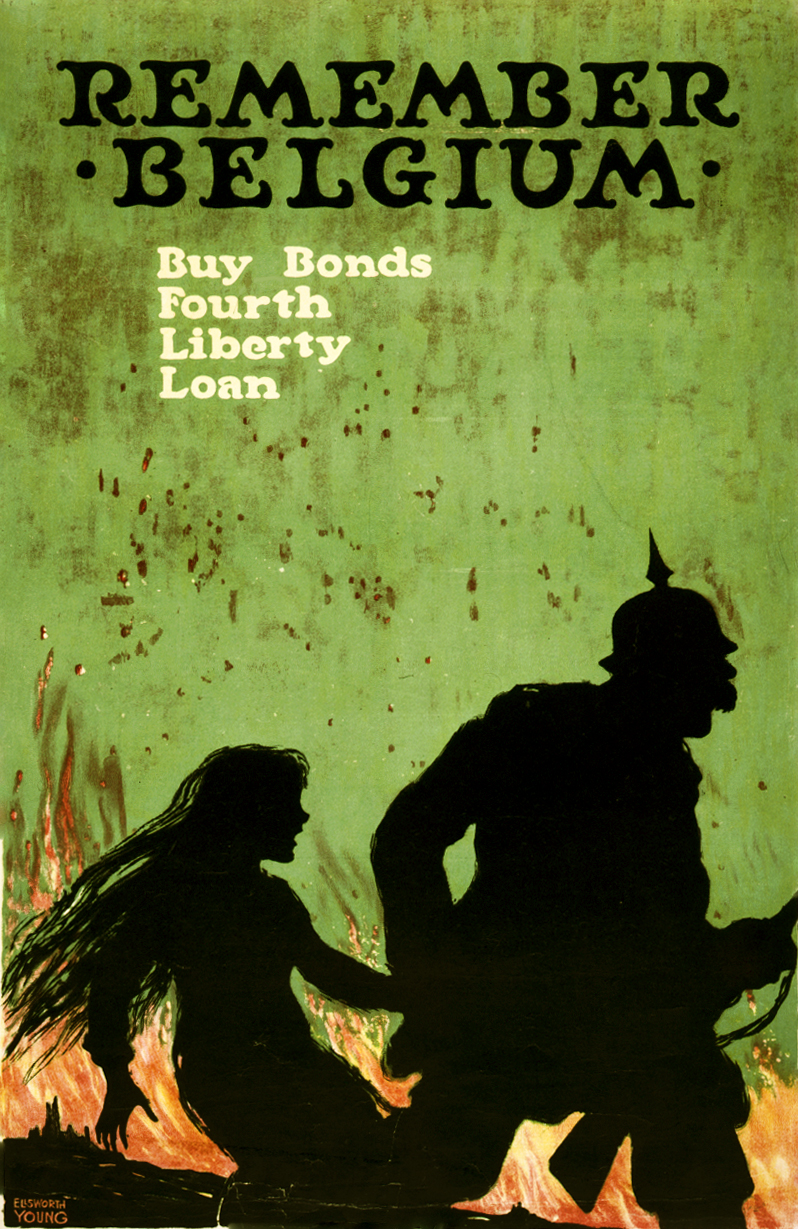
World War I poster. "Remember Belgium--Buy bonds--Fourth Liberty Loan" – During World War I, Allied Nations relied for propaganda on images and accounts of German atrocities to motivate their citizens to participate in the war effort. In this scene, the silhouetted German soldier wearing his Picklehaub drags a young girl away whilst the ruins of the city burn in the background.

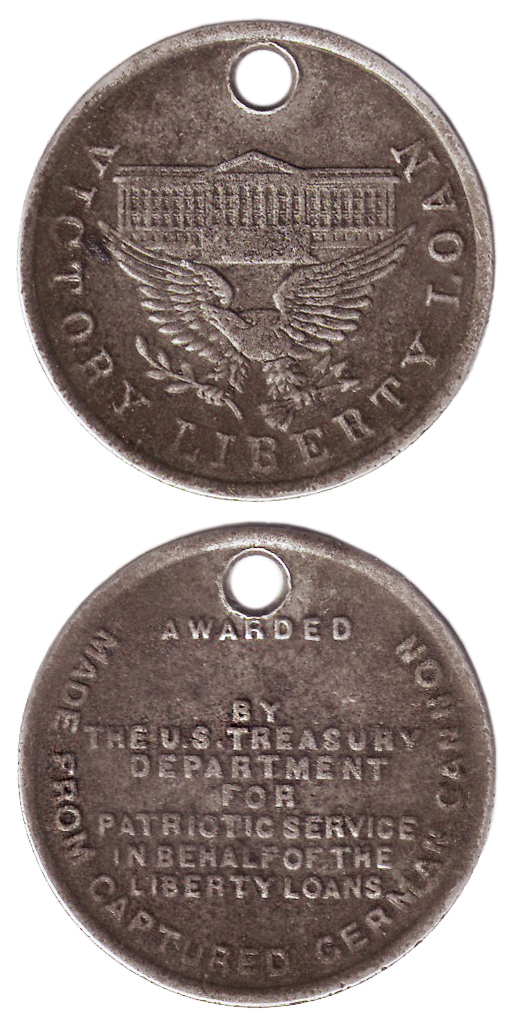
1919 Victory Liberty Loan drive steel medallion made from "captured German cannon".

Vast amounts of promotional materials were manufactured. For example, for the third Liberty Loan nine million posters, five million window stickers and 10 million buttons were produced and distributed. The campaign spurred community efforts across the country and resulted in glowing, patriotically tinged reports on the "success" of the bonds. For the fifth and final loan drive (the Victory Loan) in 1919 the Treasury Department produced steel medallions made from melted down German cannon that had been captured by American troops at Château-Thierry in NW France. The inch-and-a-quarter wide medallions suspended from a red, white, and blue ribbon were awarded by the Department to Victory Liberty Loan campaign volunteers in appreciation of their service in the drive.

Despite all these measures, a 2015 research paper has shown that patriotic motives played only a minor role in investors' decisions to buy these bonds.

Through the selling of "Liberty bonds", the government raised around $17 billion for the war effort. Considering that there were approximately 100 million Americans at the time, each American, on average, raised $170 on Liberty bonds.

According to the Massachusetts Historical Society, "Because the first World War cost the federal government more than $30 billion (by way of comparison, total federal expenditures in 1913 were only $970 million), these programs became vital as a way to raise funds".

Peak US indebtedness was in August 1919 at a value of $25,596,000,000 for Liberty Bonds, Victory Notes, War Savings Certificates, and other government securities. As early as 1922 the possibility that the war debt could not be paid in full within the expected schedule was raised, and that debt rescheduling may be needed. In 1921 the Treasury Department began issuing short term notes maturing in three to five years to repay the Victory Loan.

=== Federal Reserve’s role ===
The Federal Reserve also took an active role in promoting war bonds to commercial banks and the general public. The Federal Reserve provided loans at preferential rates for banks to purchase war bonds, which generated significant profits for member banks, led to a massive increase in the Fed’s balance sheet, and caused inflation rates ranging from 13 to 20%.

== Victory Liberty Loan ==
A fifth bond issue relating to World War I was released on April 21, 1919. Consisting of $4.5 billion of gold notes at 4.75% interest, they matured after four years but could be redeemed by the government after three. Exempt from all income taxes, they were called at the time "the last of the series of five Liberty Loans." However they were also called the "Victory Liberty Loan", and appear this way on posters of the period.

== Repayment ==
The first three bonds and the Victory Loan were partially retired during the course of the 1920s, but the majority of these bonds were simply re-financed through other government securities. The Victory Loan, which was to mature in May 1923, was retired with money raised by short term treasury notes which matured after three to five years and issued at 90-day intervals until sufficient funds were raised in 1921. The likelihood of successfully retiring all of the war debt (within the amount of time) was noted as early as 1921. In 1927, the 2nd and 3rd, together worth five billion dollars (25% of all government debt at the time), were called for redemption and refunded through the issuance of other government securities through the Treasury Department. Some of the principal was retired. For example, of the 3.1 billion dollars owed on the 2nd Liberty Bond, 575 million in principal was retired and the rest refinanced. At this same time, the 1st Liberty Bond still had 1.9 billion dollars outstanding in 1927 with a call date for 1932 while the fourth Liberty Bond, with six billion dollars, had a call date for 1932 as well.

== Default of the Fourth Liberty Bond ==
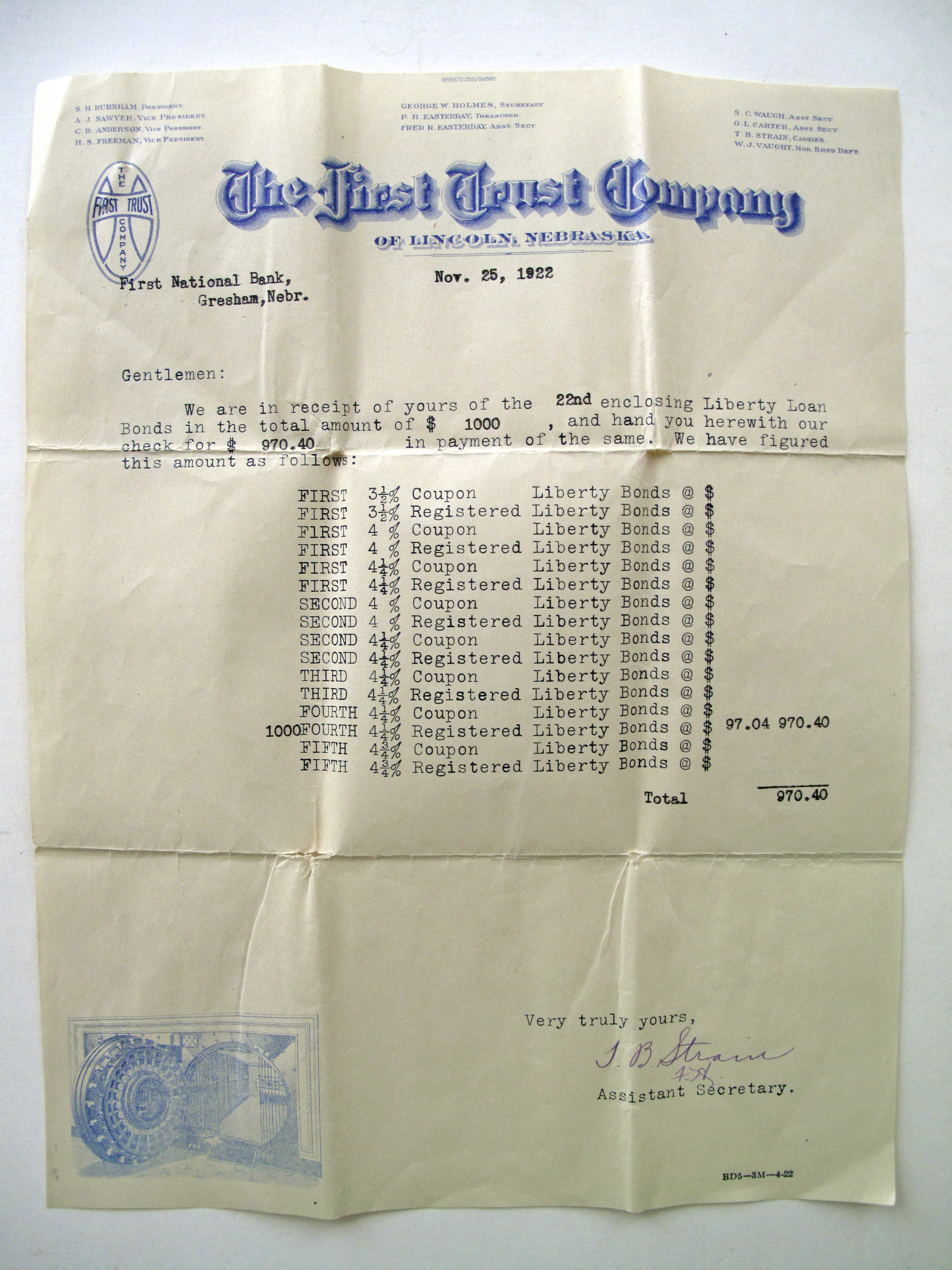
Liberty bond redemption letter 1922

The first three Liberty bonds, and the Victory Loan, were retired during the course of the 1920s. However, because the terms of the bonds allowed them to be traded for the later bonds which had superior terms, most of the debt from the first, second, and third Liberty bonds was rolled into the fourth issue.

The fourth Liberty Bond had the following terms:

- Date of Bond: October 24, 1918
- Coupon Rate: 4.25%
- Callable Starting: October 15, 1933
- Maturity Date: October 15, 1938
- Amount Originally Tendered: $6 billion
- Amount Sold: $7 billion

The terms of the bond included: "The principal and interest hereof are payable in United States gold coin of the present standard of value." This type of "gold clause" was common in both public and private contracts of the time, and was intended to guarantee that bond-holders would not be harmed by a devaluation of the currency.

However, when the US Treasury called the fourth bond on April 15, 1934, it defaulted on this term by refusing to redeem the bond in gold, and neither did it account for the devaluation of the dollar from $20.67 per troy ounce of gold (the 1918 standard of value) to $35 per ounce. The 21 million bond holders therefore lost 139 million troy ounces of gold, or approximately 41% of the bond's principal.

The legal basis for the refusal of the US Treasury to redeem in gold was the gold clause resolution (Pub. Res. 73–10), dated June 5, 1933. The Supreme Court later held the gold clause resolution to be unconstitutional under section 4 of the Fourteenth Amendment:

We conclude that the Joint Resolution of June 5, 1933, insofar as it attempted to override the obligation created by the bond in suit, went beyond the congressional power.

— Chief Justice Charles Evans Hughes, Perry v. United States, 294 U.S. 330, 354 (1935)

However, due to President Franklin D. Roosevelt's elimination of the open gold market with the signing of Executive Order 6102 on April 5, 1933, the Court ruled that the bond-holders' loss was unquantifiable, and that to repay them in dollars according to the 1918 standard of value would be an "unjustified enrichment". The ruling therefore had little practical effect.

== Political affiliation ==
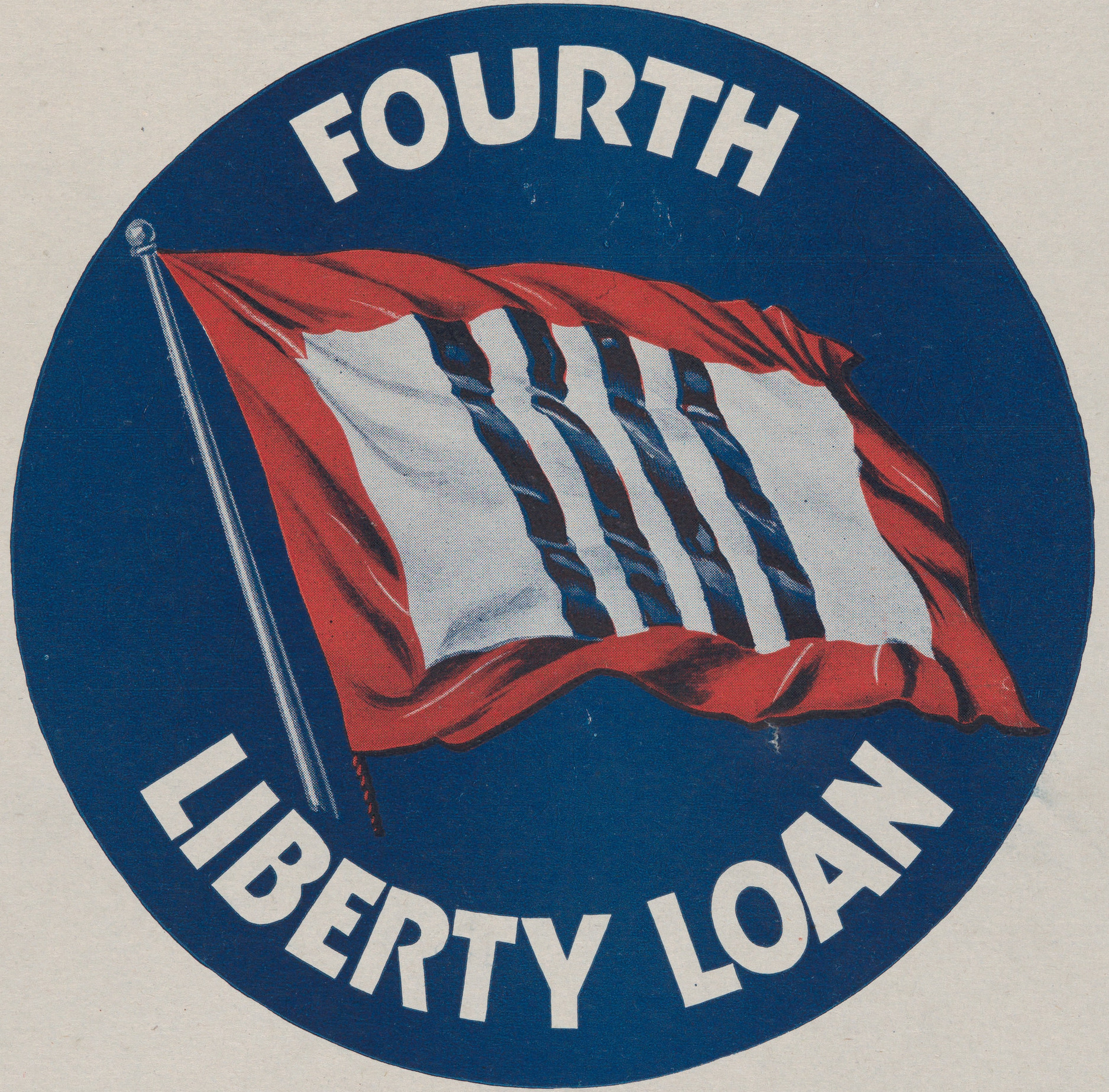
A logo for the Fourth Liberty Loan; its successor would be the last one issued.

According to a 2020 study, "counties with higher liberty bond ownership rates turned against the Democratic Party in the presidential elections of 1920 and 1924. This was a reaction to the depreciation of the bonds prior to the 1920 election (when the Democrats held the presidency) and the appreciation of the bonds in the early 1920s (under a Republican president), as the Federal Reserve raised and then subsequently lowered interest rates."

== Market impact ==
A bond trader came under investigation and was attacked as "unpatriotic" for selling below par. The Board of Governors of the New York Stock Exchange conducted an investigation of brokerage firms who sold below par to determine if "pro-German influences" were at work. The board forced one such broker to buy the bonds back at par and make a $100,000 donation to the Red Cross.

The government at times had to discourage use of the bonds as quasi-money in the purchase of merchandise, as this was defeating the purpose of the bonds to promote thrift and to make labor and materials available to the government. This circulation of bonds was also seen as stimulating the sale of bonds on the secondary market for cash, which would have depressed the bond price and this would have made further government bond sales more difficult, as the interest on new bonds would then have to increase to achieve a competitive yield.

== Selected Liberty Loan poster artists, designers, cartoonists, and illustrators ==
- Fernando Amorsolo y Cueto (1892–1972)
- Edmund Marion Ashe (1867–1941)
- Cyrus Leroy Baldridge (1889–1977)
- Gerrit Albertus Beneker (1882–1934), Sure! We'll Finish the Job.
- Oscar Edward Cesare (1883–1948)
- Howard Chandler Christy (1873–1952), illustrator whose Liberty Loan posters included a woman standing before an American flag, raising a laurel garland above a scroll listing purchasers of government bonds.
- Richard Edward Devney (1868–1949), Cleveland printer and publisher, designed the door-hanger poster Ring Me Again, encouraging households to purchase Liberty Bonds.
- Frank Vincent DuMond (1865–1951) – designed Liberty Loan posters.
- Harvey Thomas Dunn (1884–1952) – produced several Liberty Loan posters, including battlefield-themed works.
- Walter Hunt Everett (1880–1946), illustrator who designed several Liberty Loan posters featuring allegorical and patriotic themes.
- James Montgomery Flagg (1877–1960) – designed Liberty Loan posters in addition to the famous I Want YOU recruiting poster.
- Harrison Fisher (1875–1934) – created Liberty Loan posters featuring female patriotic figures.
- Victor Clyde Forsythe (1885–1962)
- Florentine Harriet Hayden (1859–1943), Connecticut artist and daughter of Waterbury inventor and artist Hiram Hayden, designed a Liberty Loan poster featuring portraits of George Washington, the Marquis de Lafayette, Abraham Lincoln, and Woodrow Wilson surrounding a stars-and-stripes shield and eagle.
- Lawrence Stewart Harris (1885–1970)
- Paul Austin Ickes (1895–1950)
- Joseph Christian Leyendecker (1874–1951)
- Charles Waldo Love (1881–1967)
- Vincent Lynel, Ammunition! And Remember—Bonds Buy Bullets, illustrated a soldier firing a machine gun and reaching back [for ammunition] (Ketterlinus Lithographic Manufacturing Company, Philadelphia).
- Charles Raymond Macauley (1871–1934), illustrated the Statue of Liberty with the caption You Buy a Liberty Bond Lest I Perish, one of the best-known Liberty Loan posters.
- Zenas Winsor McCay (1869–1934)
- John Warner Norton (1876–1934), designed a Third Liberty Loan poster featuring the Liberty Bell as its central image.
- Herbert Andrew Paus (1860–1946)
- Edward Penfield (1866–1925) – contributed Liberty Loan poster designs.
- Joseph Pennell (1857–1926), designed the dramatic poster That Liberty Shall Not Perish from the Earth, depicting a devastated New York City under aerial bombardment to emphasize the consequences of military defeat.
- Robert Hunter Porteous (1865–1939)
- Louis Raemaekers (1869–1956), cartoonist.
- Henry Patrick Raleigh (1880–1944), illustrated Liberty Loan posters including Halt the Hun and Buy More Liberty Bonds.
- Sidney Harry Riesenberg (1885–1971), illustrated patriotic posters including Over the Top for You, showing an American soldier carrying the U.S. flag, and Lend As They Fight, depicting advancing riflemen.
- Charles Nicolas Sarka (1879–1960), Lend Him a Hand, Buy Liberty Bonds
- Leon Alaric Shafer (1866–1940), illustrated the poster They Kept the Sea Lanes Open, depicting a surfaced Allied submarine and destroyer escorting a merchant convoy through heavy seas.
- James Allen St. John (1872–1957)
- Frederick Strothmann (1872–1958), designed Beat Back the Hun with Liberty Bonds, portraying a menacing German soldier to encourage public support for the Liberty Loan campaign.
- Walter Whitehead (1874–1936), designed the 1918 poster Come On! Buy More Liberty Bonds, depicting an American soldier advancing over a fallen enemy.
- Newell Convers Wyeth (1882–1945) – designed Liberty Loan and Red Cross posters.
- Ellsworth Young (1866–1952), illustrator who designed several Liberty Loan and Victory Loan posters.

=== Liberty Bond posters ===
Selection of posters promoting the purchase of Liberty Bonds
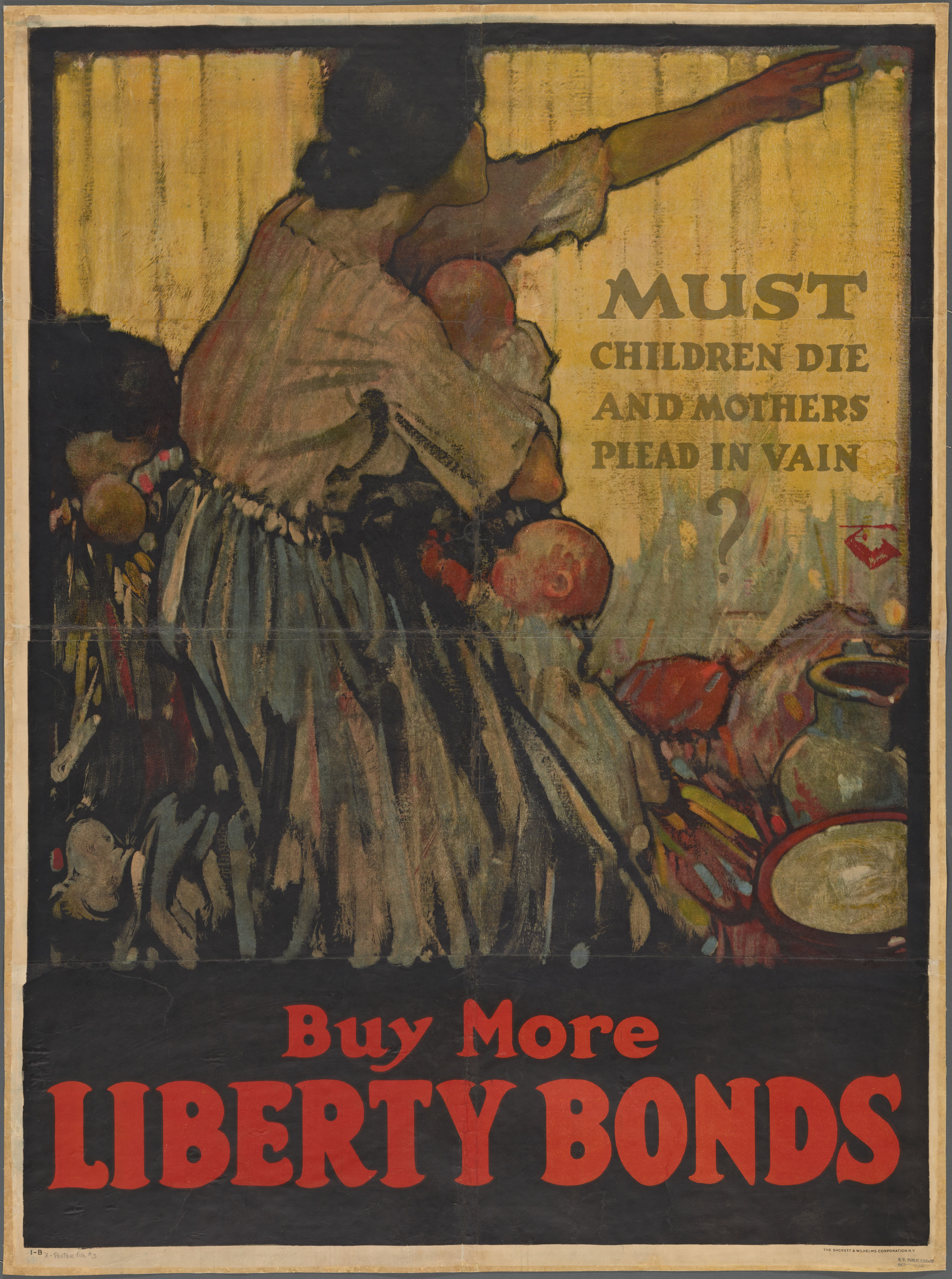
a

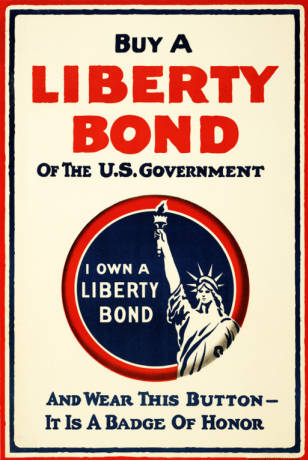
1

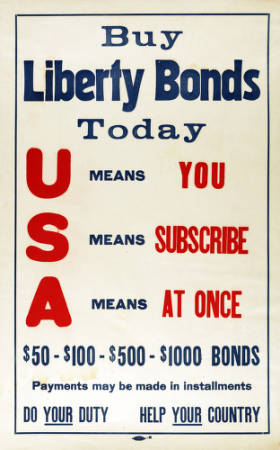
2

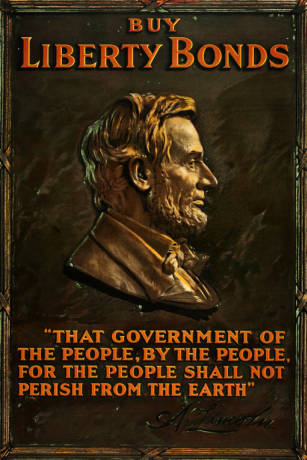
3

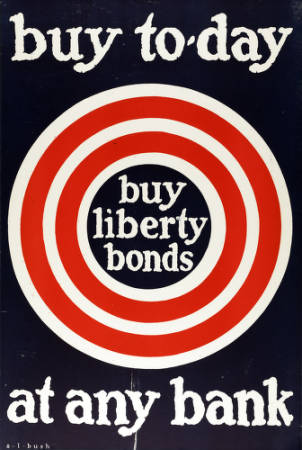
4

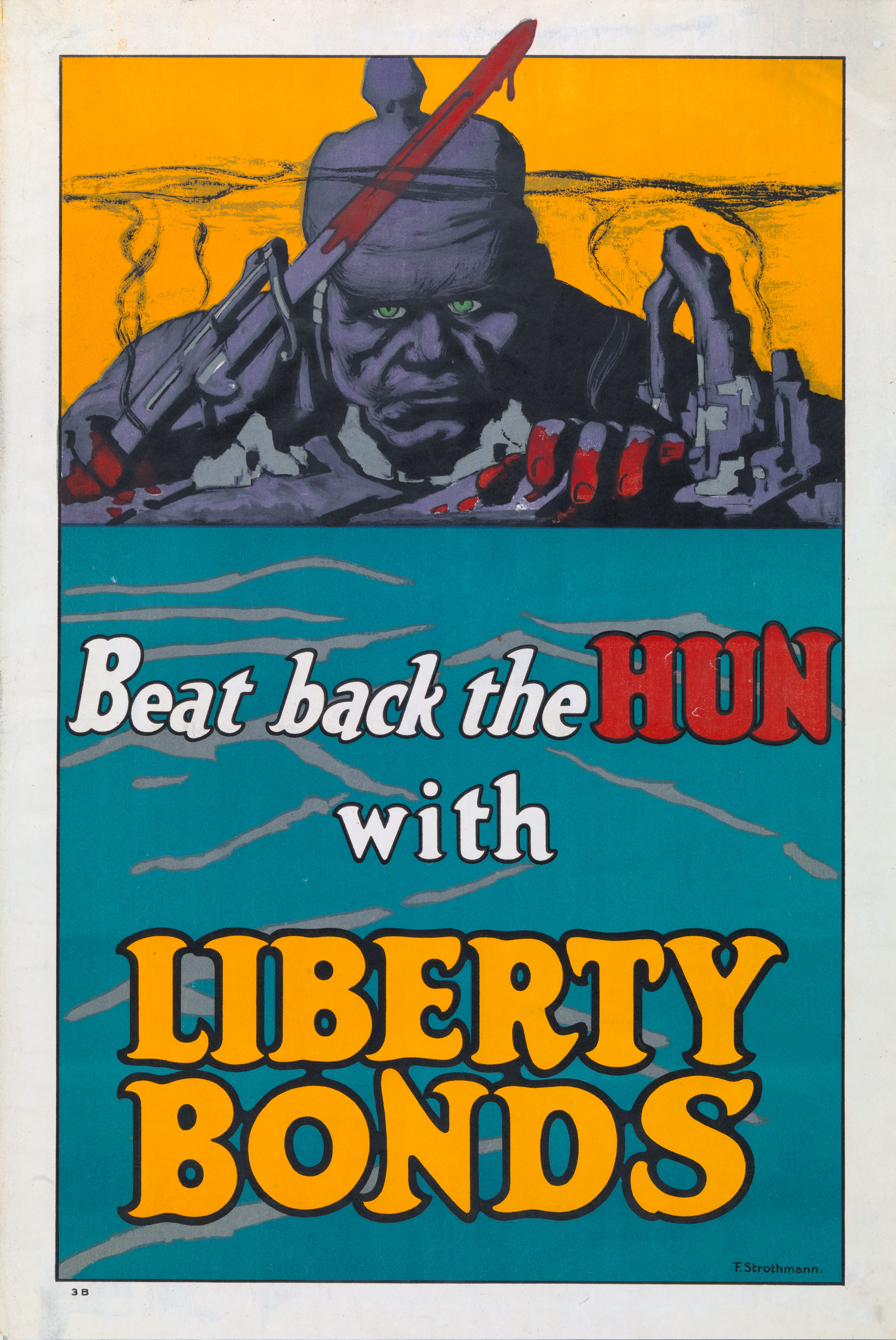
5

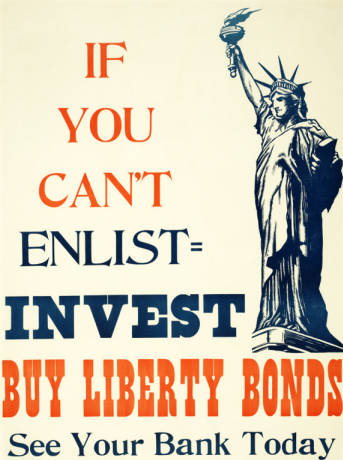
8

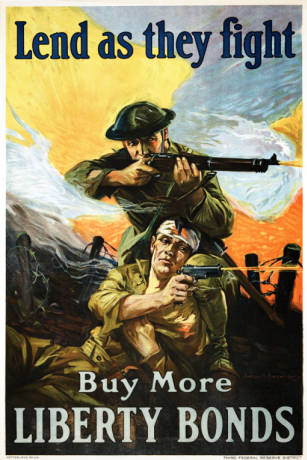
9

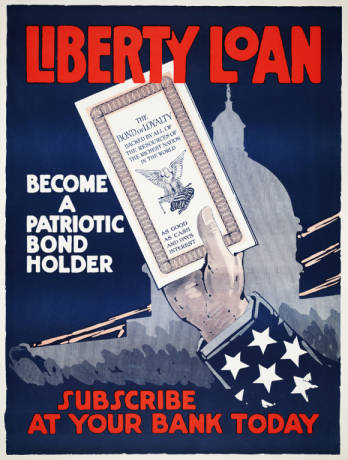
10
First Liberty Loan
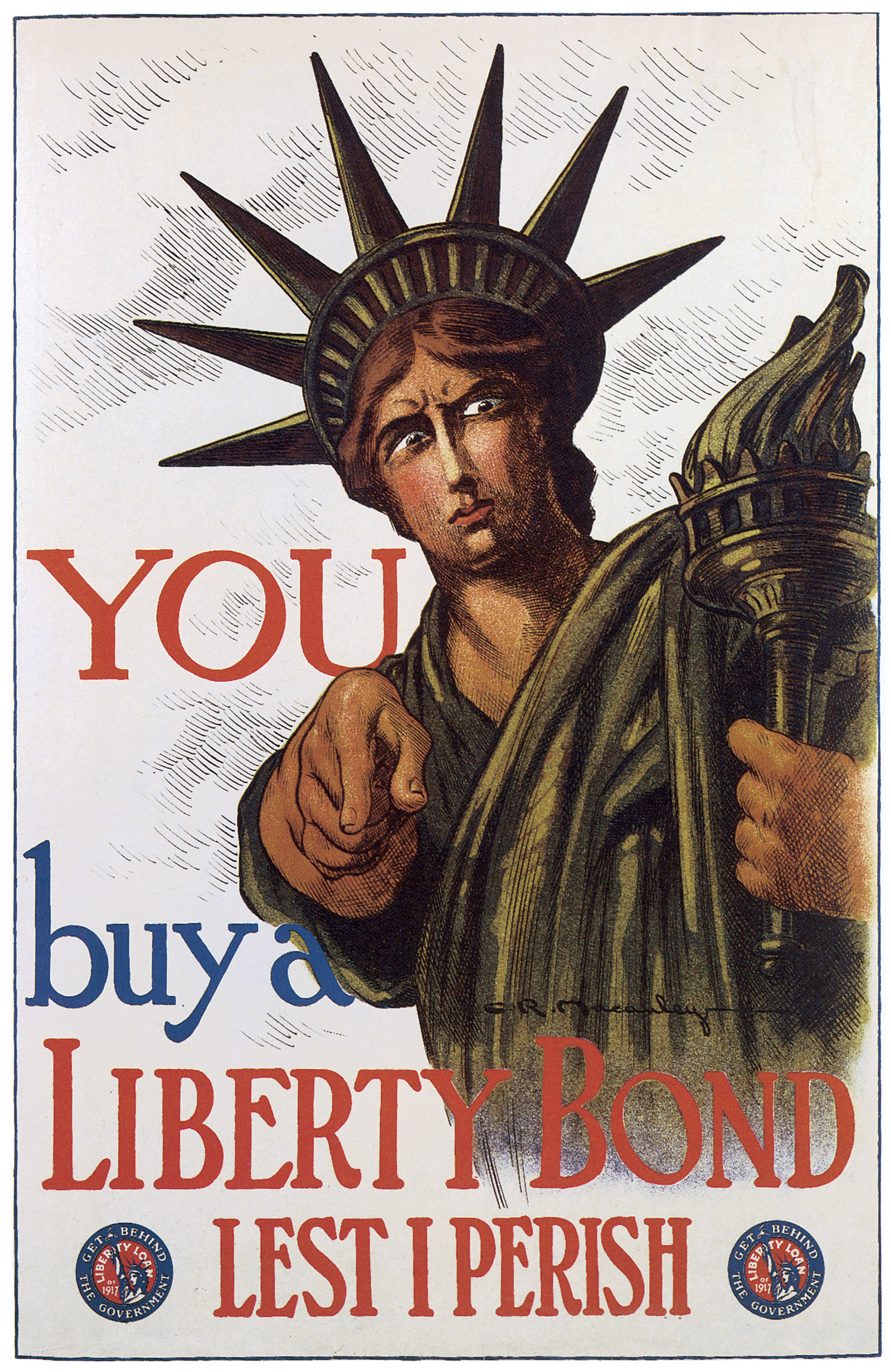
Second Liberty Loan
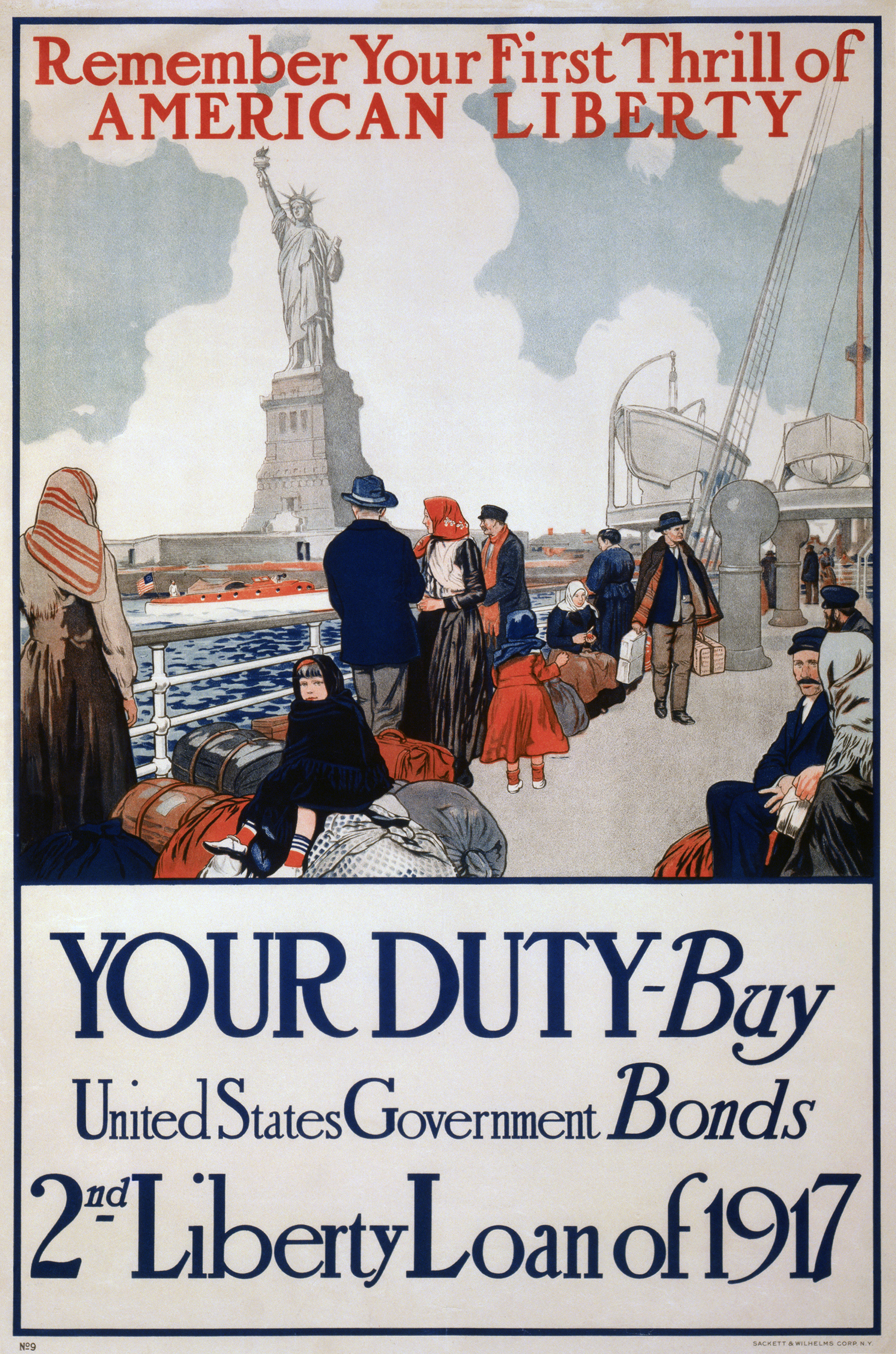

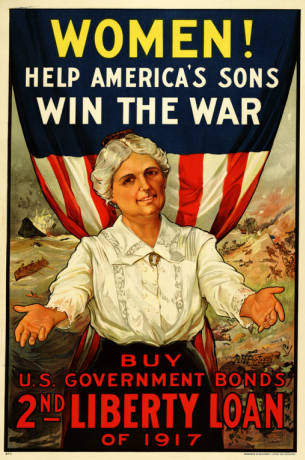

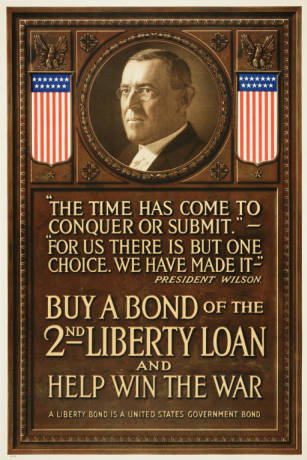
6

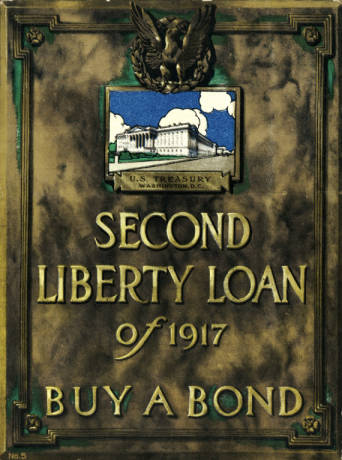
14
Third Liberty Loan
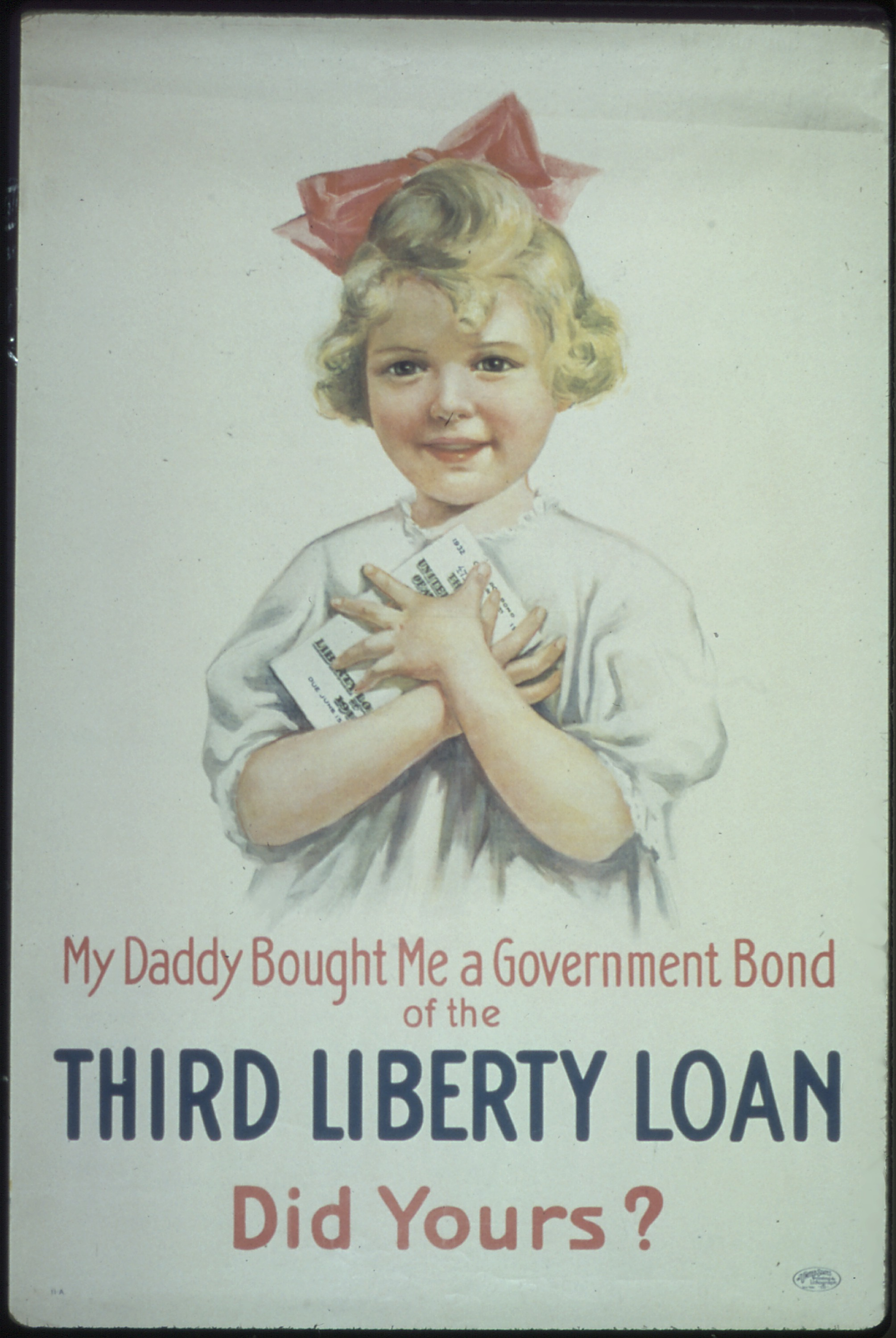

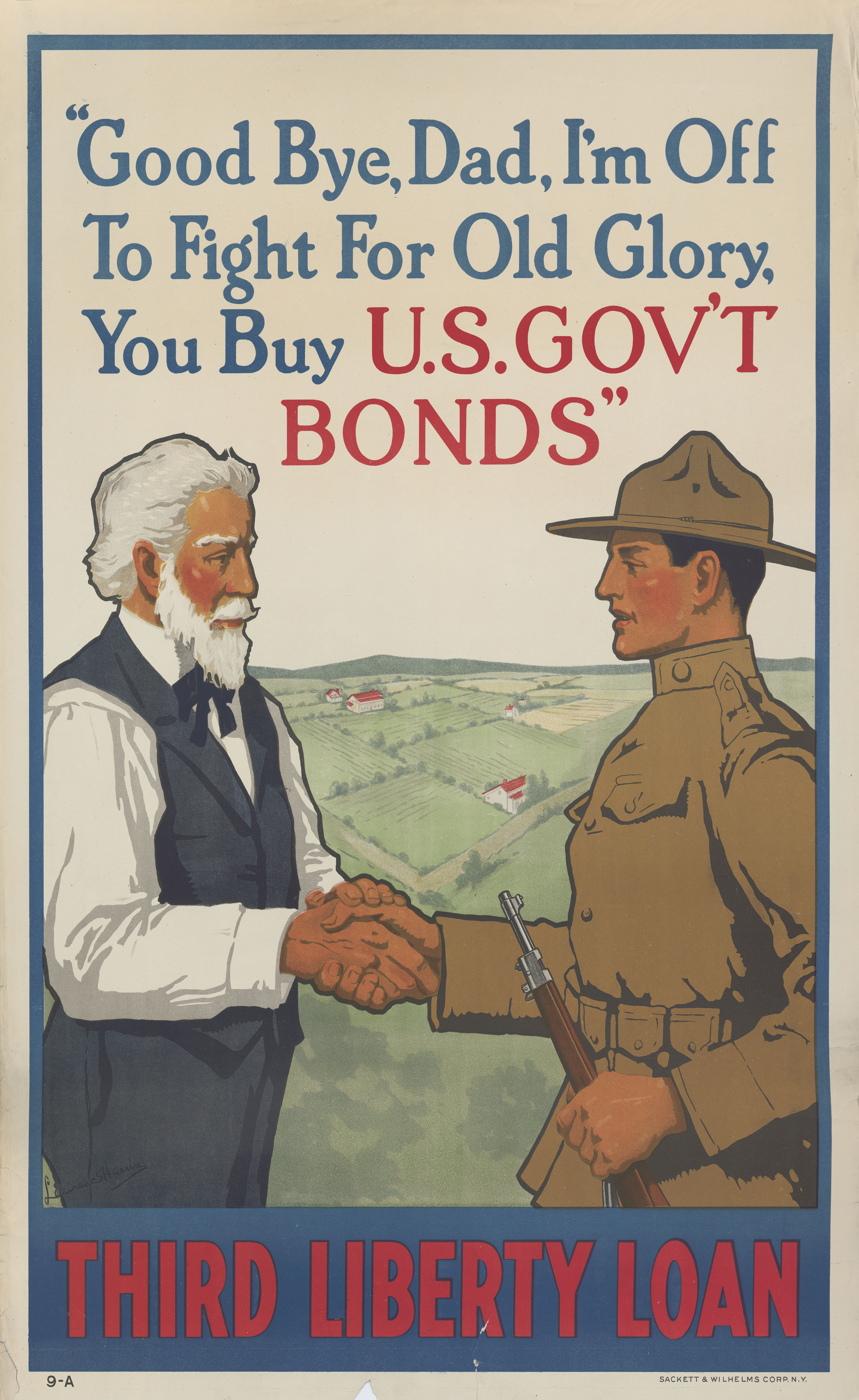

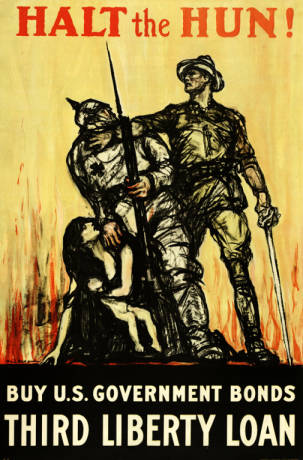
7

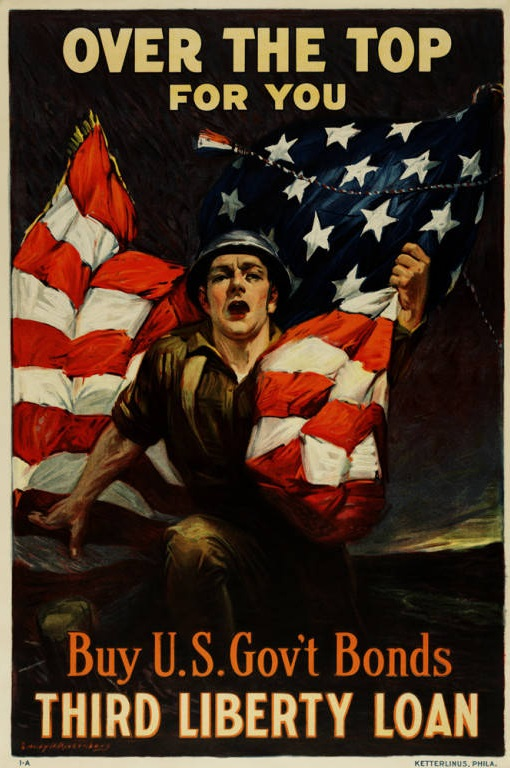
12

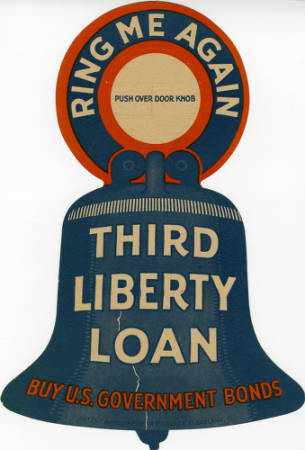
13

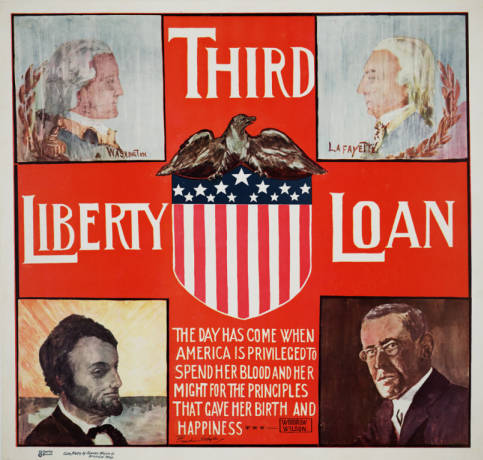
15

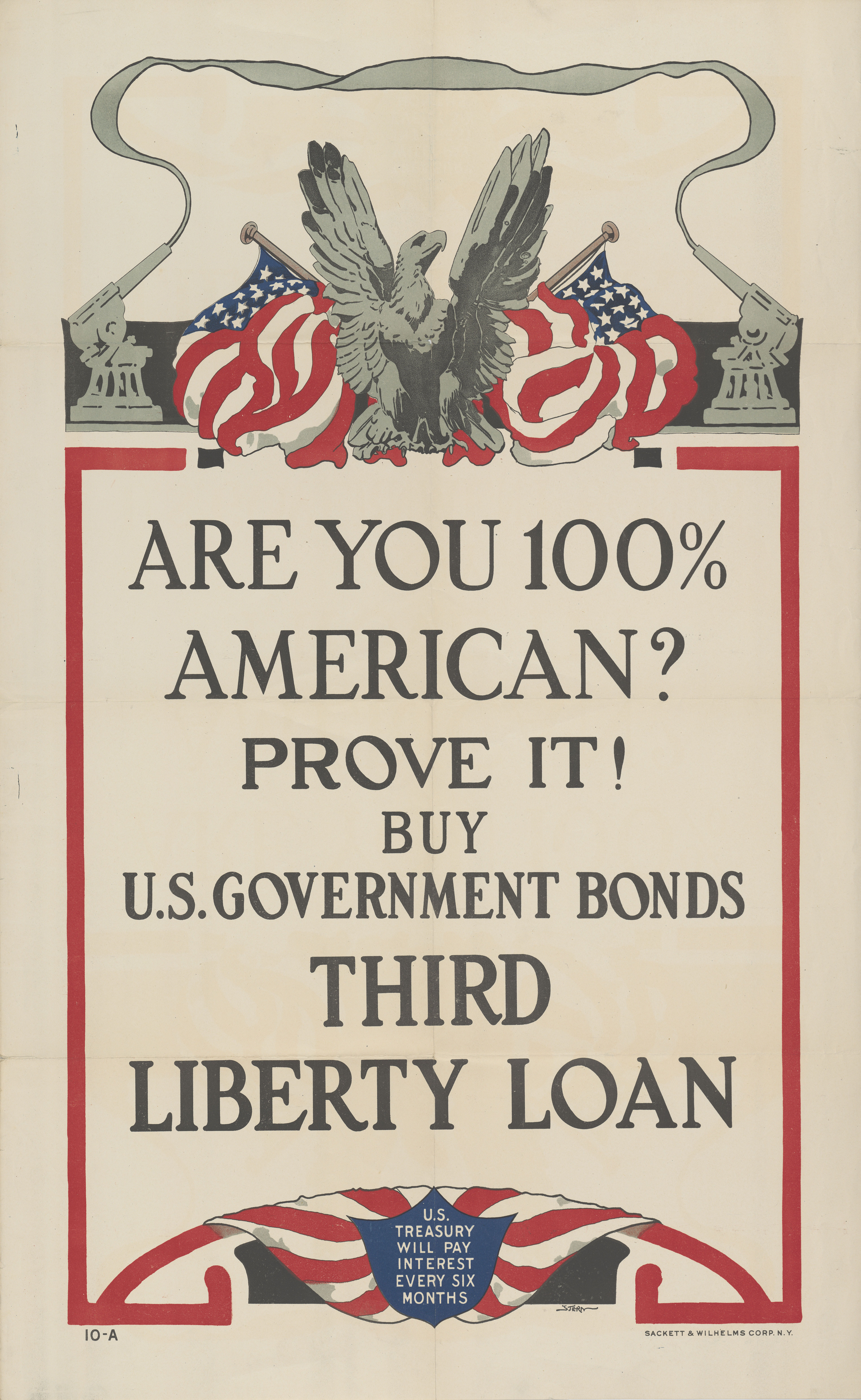
18
Fourth Liberty Loan
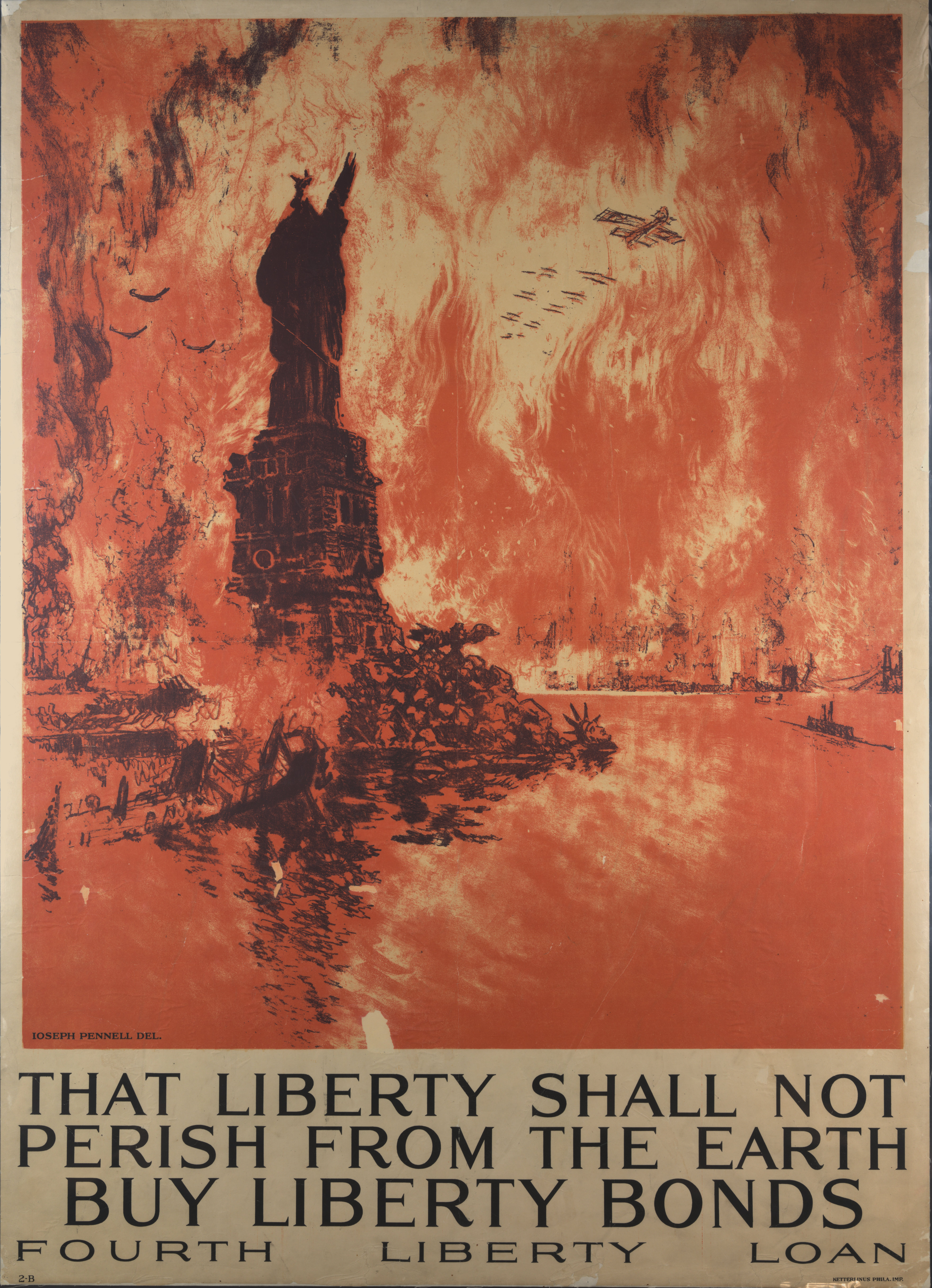

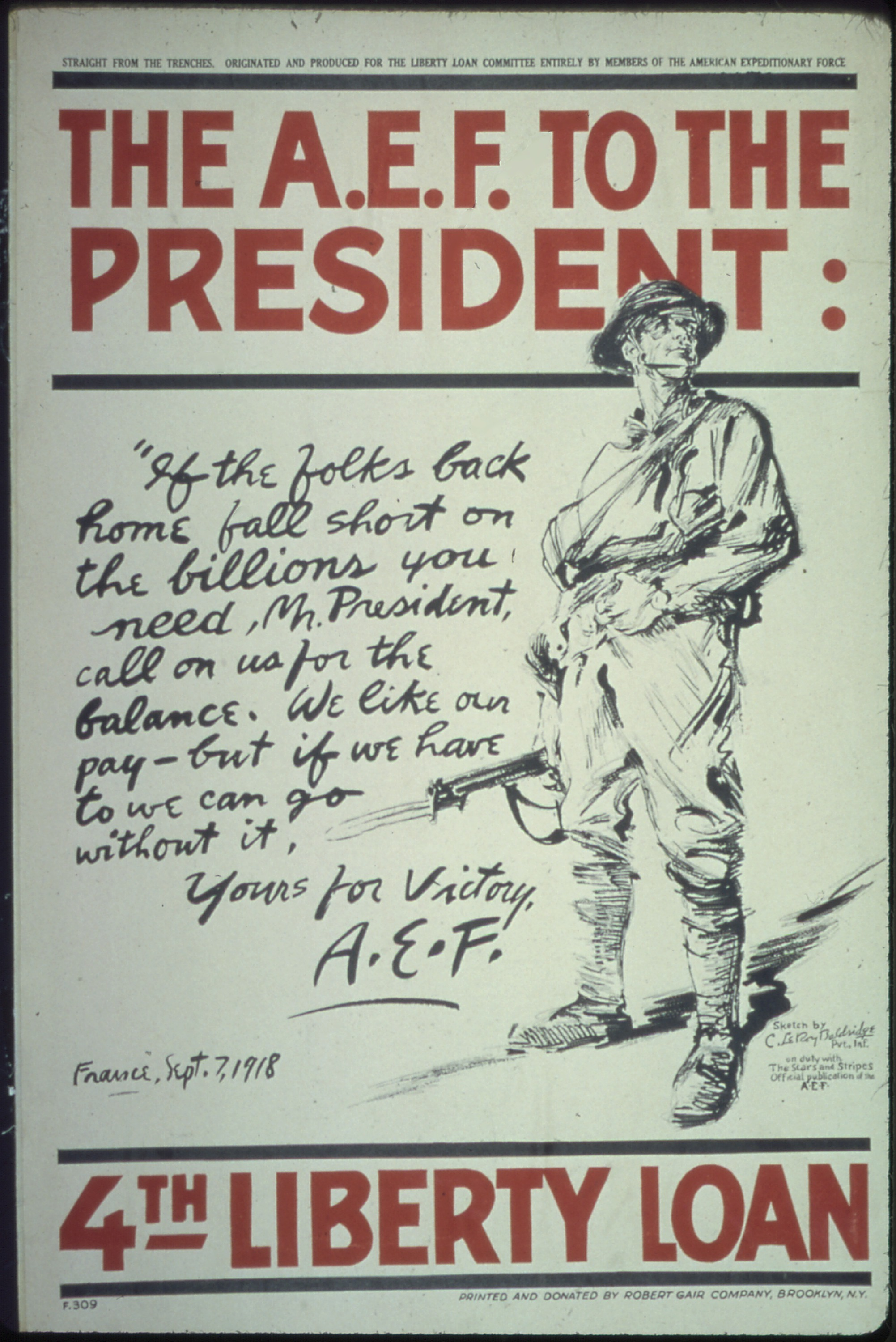

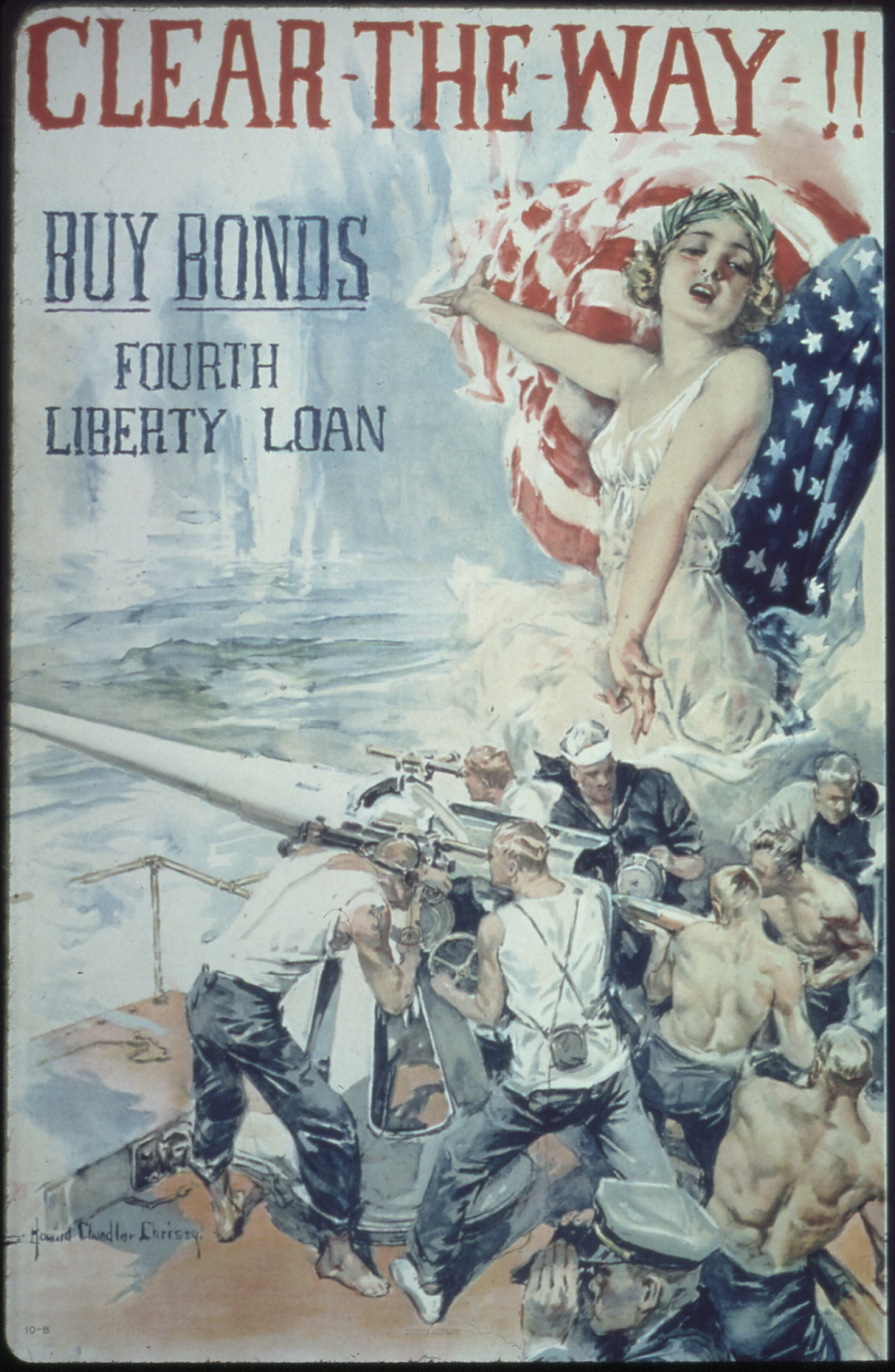

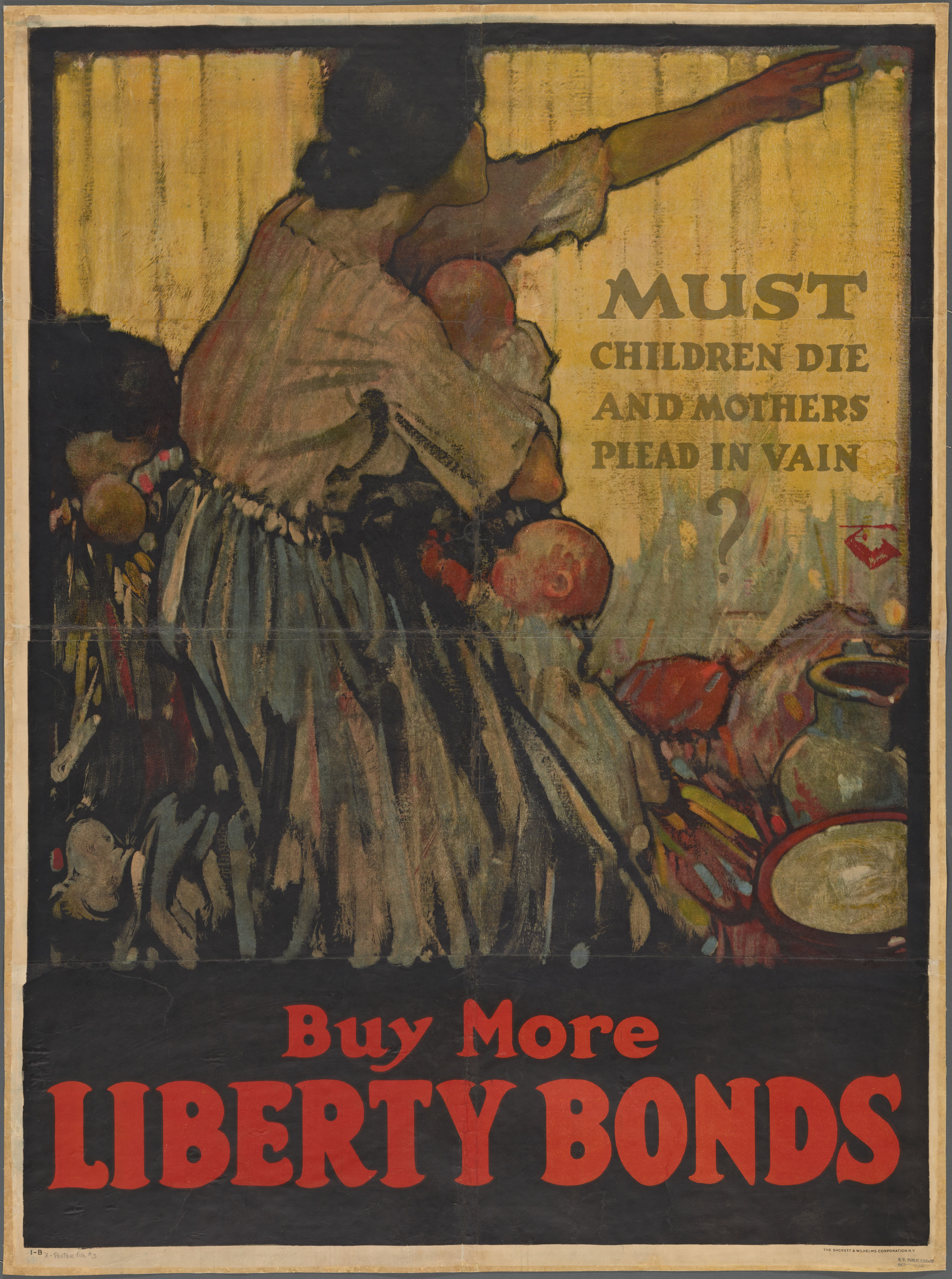
Victory Liberty Loan
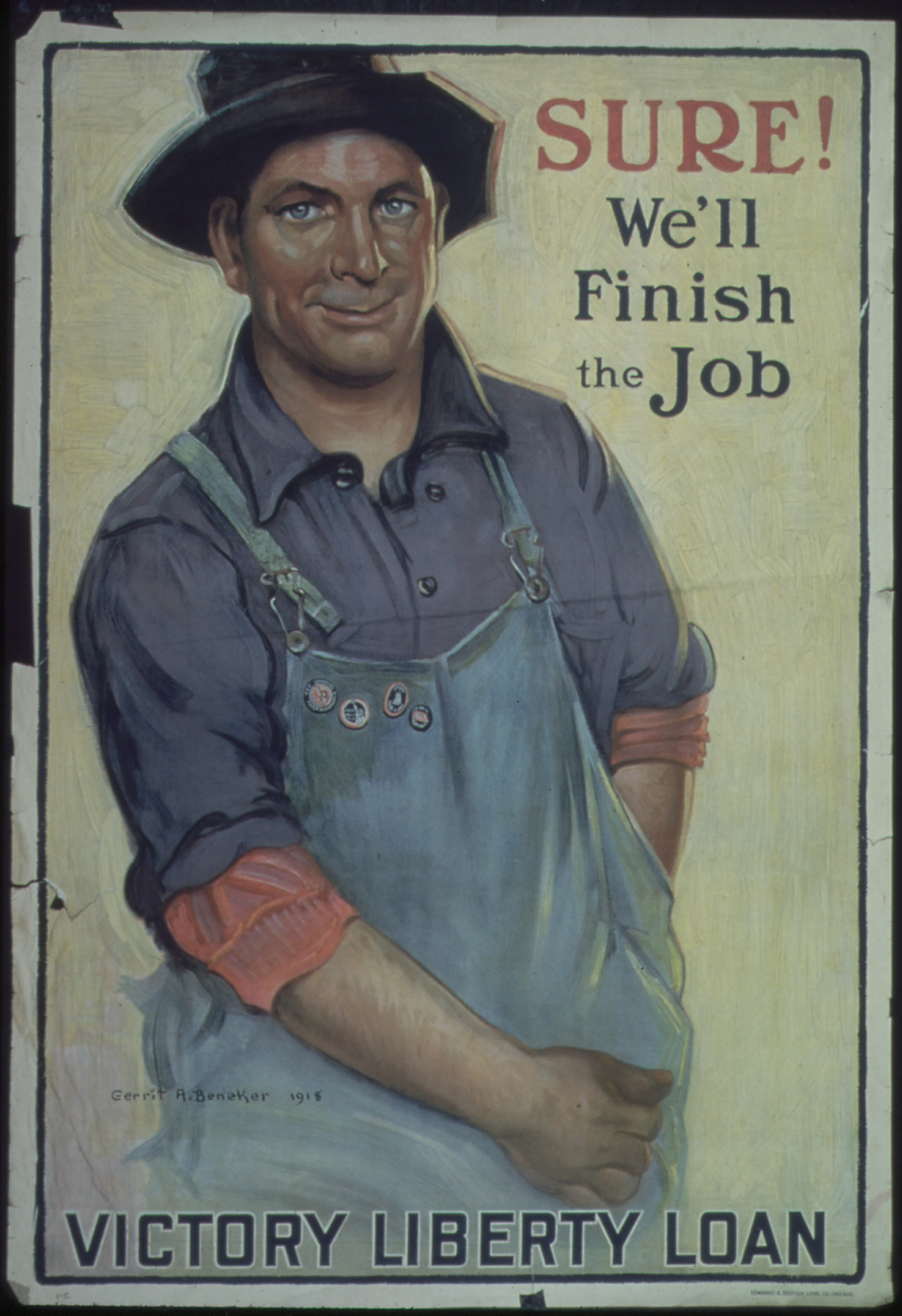
Gerrit Albertus Beneker
(1882–1934)

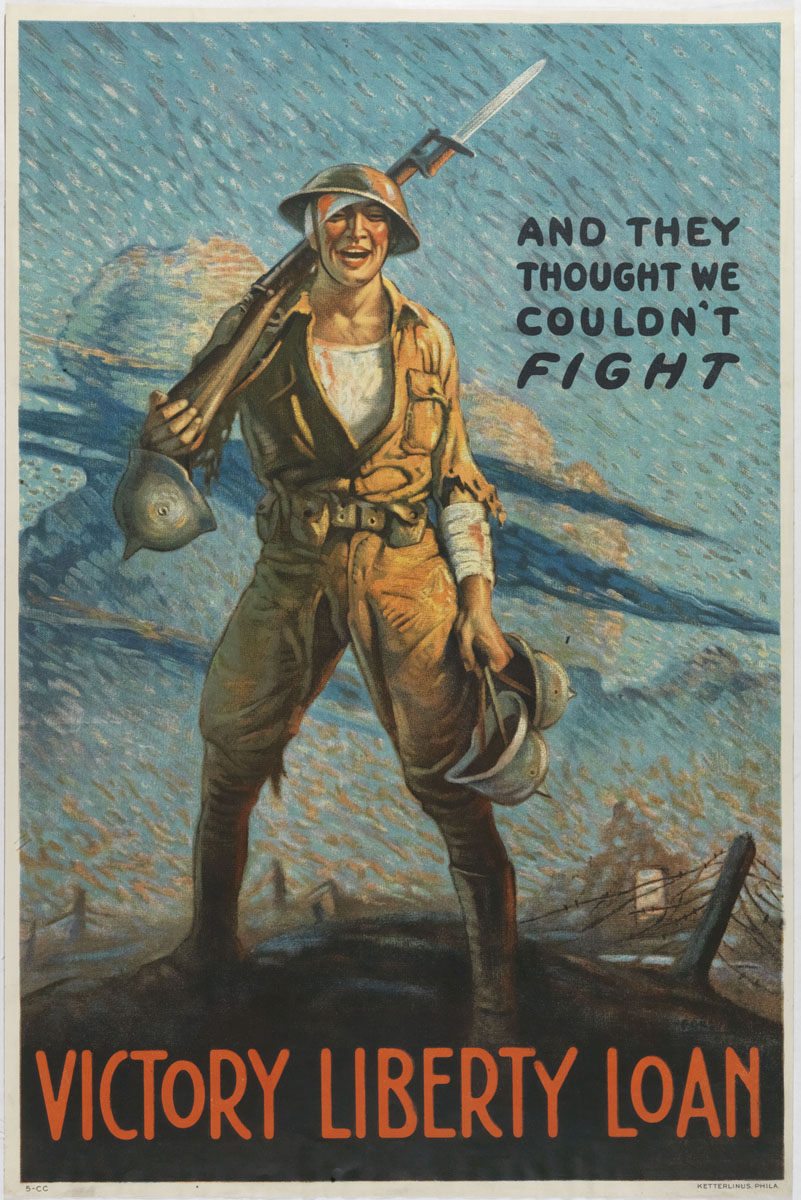

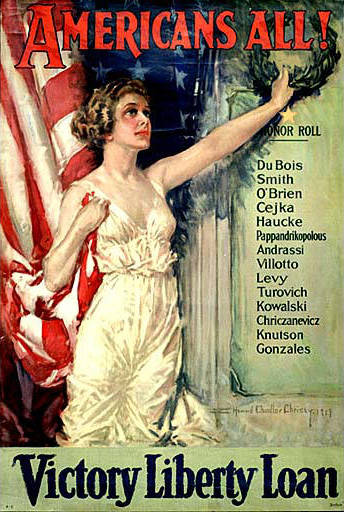

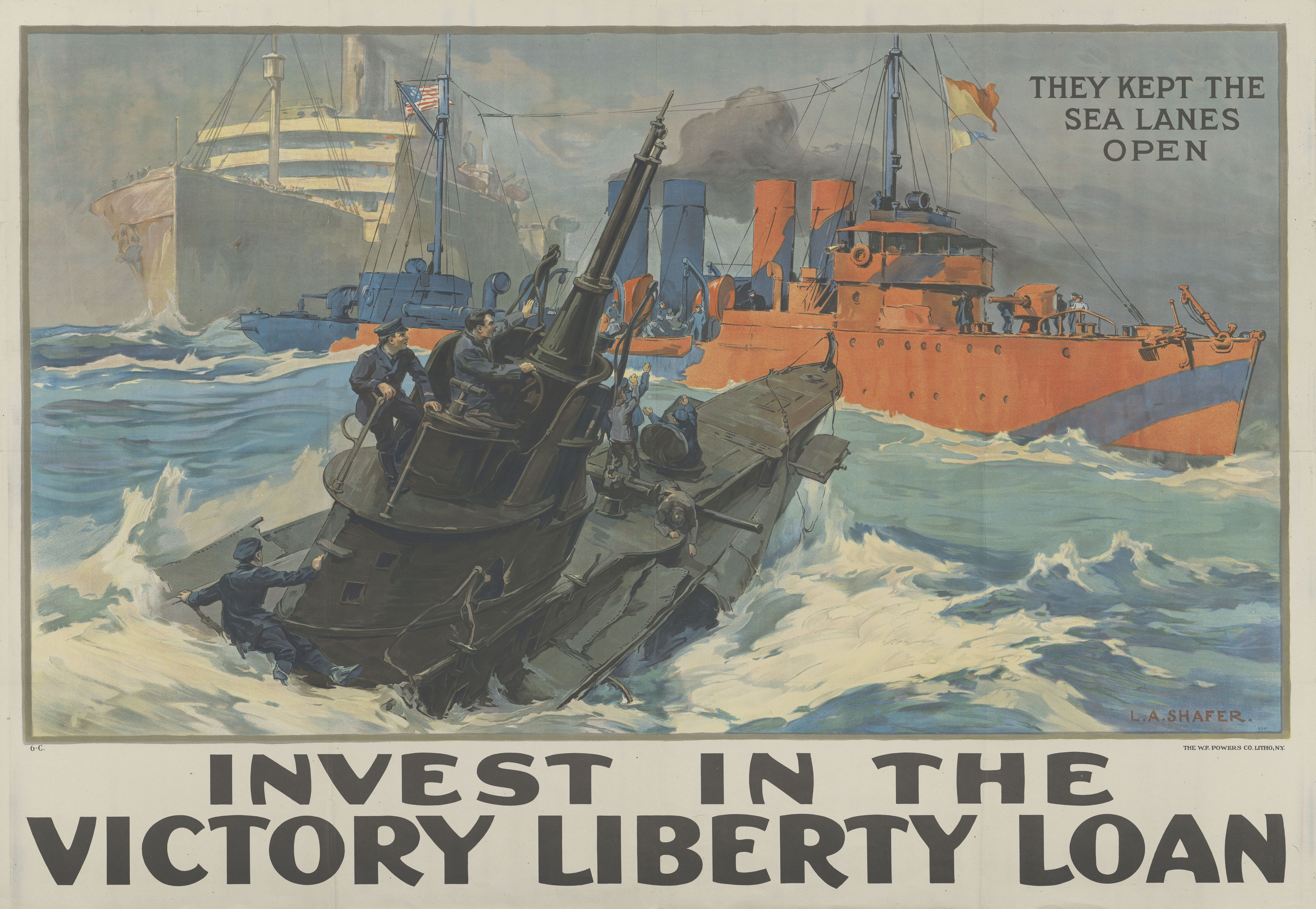
17

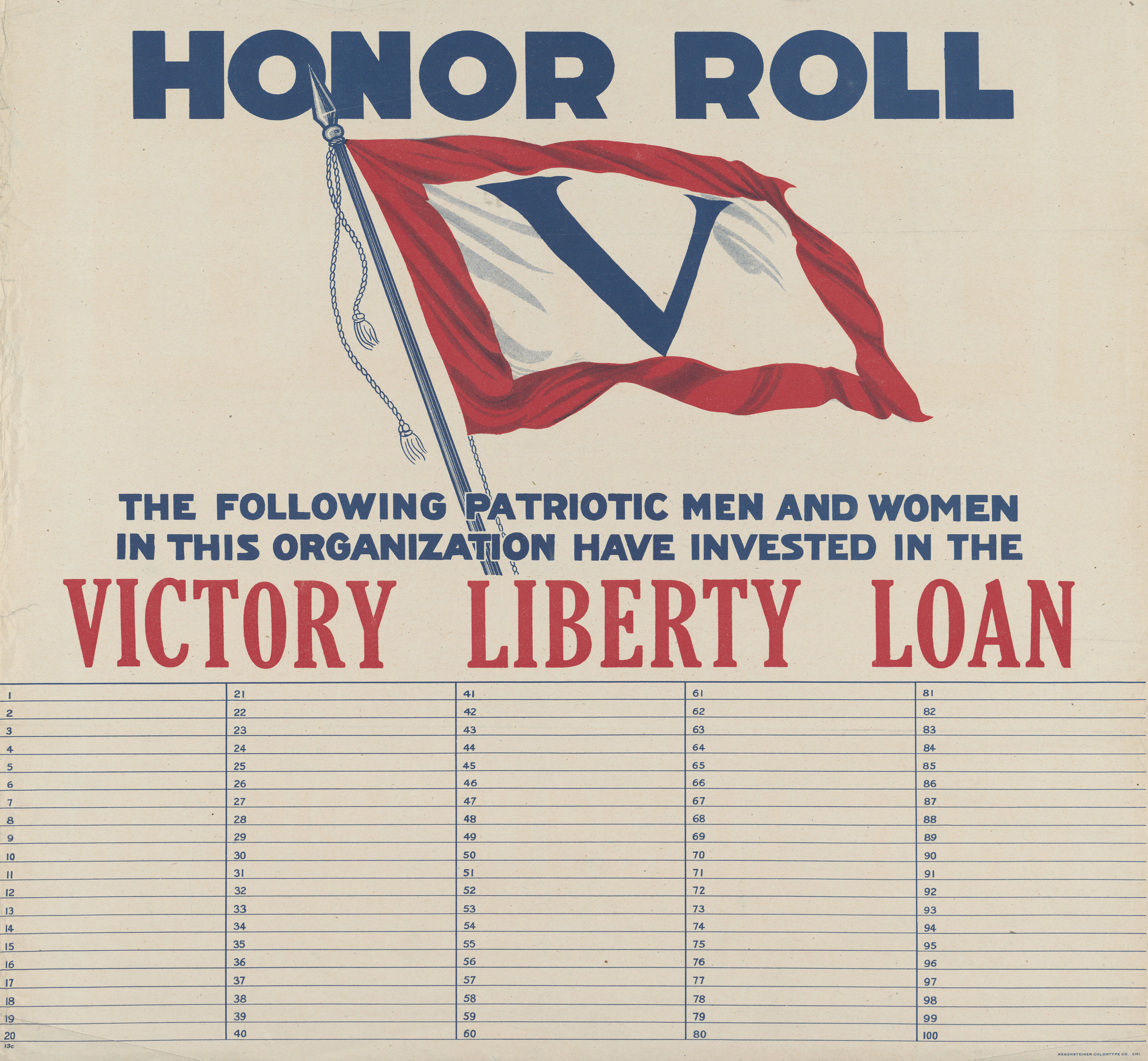
19

== See also ==
- Economic history of the United States#World War I
- Economic history of World War I
- National debt of the United States
- Philadelphia Liberty Loans Parade
- United States home front during World War I
- War bond (World War II)

== Bibliography ==
=== Secondary sources ===
- Chase, Philip M. (2008). William Gibbs McAdoo: The Last Progressive, (1863--1941). p. 130ff. ISBN 9780549982326.
- Childs, C. Frederick. "United States Government Bonds." Annals of the American Academy of Political and Social Science 88 (1920): 43–50. in JSTOR
- Financier (The) (June 23, 1917). "Man Who Sold Liberty Bonds Cheap, Repentant". Vol. 109, New Series 1718. p. 1741.
1. Via HathiTrust (University of Michigan).
2. Via Google Books (University of Michigan).
- Garbade, Kenneth D. (2012). Birth of a Market: The U.S. Treasury Securities Market from the Great War to the Great Depression. MIT Press. pp. 69ff, ch. 5. ISBN 9780262016377.
- Hart Jr, Henry M. "The Gold Clause in United States Bonds" Harvard Law Review 48 (1934): 1057.
- Hollihan, Thomas A. "Propagandizing in the interest of war: A rhetorical study of the committee on public information." Southern Journal of Communication 49.3 (1984): 241–257.
- Kang, Sung Won, and Hugh Rockoff. "Capitalizing Patriotism: The Liberty Loans of World War I" (Paper No. w11919. National Bureau of Economic Research, 2006)
- Kimble, James J. Mobilizing the home front: war bonds and domestic propaganda (Texas A&M University Press, 2006)

=== Primary sources ===
- Browne, Porter Emerson (1918). A Liberty Loan Primer. New York: Liberty Loan Committee, Second Federal Reserve District. OCLC 2315245.
- Lee, Higginson & Co. (1920). Liberty Bonds: A Handbook. London: Higginson & Co. OCLC 318644142.
