= Eberstadt (disambiguation) =

Eberstadt is a municipality in Baden-Württemberg, Germany

Eberstadt may also refer to:

== Places ==
- a borough in Darmstadt-Eberstadt, Germany
- a borough in Buchen, Germany
- Eberstedt, a municipality in Thuringia, Germany

== Persons ==
- Otto Eberstadt, a strongman and circus performer
- a member of the Eberstadt-Kahn family:
  - Ferdinand Eberstadt (mayor)
  - Rudolph Eberstadt, economist and urban planner
  - Otto Hermann Kahn, investment banker and philanthropist
  - Roger Wolfe Kahn, musician and composer
- a member of the Eberstadt-Nash family:
  - Ferdinand Eberstadt (policy advisor), lawyer, investment banker and policy advisor
  - Ogden Nash, poet
  - Frederick Eberstadt, photographer and father of Fernanda Eberstadt and Nicholas Eberstadt
  - Esther Eberstadt Brooke
  - Fernanda Eberstadt, writer
  - Nicholas Eberstadt, demographer and political economist
  - Mary Eberstadt, writer

== Other ==
- Eberstadt Report
