= Ferdinand Eberstadt =

Ferdinand Eberstadt may refer to:

- Ferdinand Eberstadt (mayor) (1808–1888), first Jewish mayor in Germany
- Ferdinand Eberstadt (policy advisor) (1890–1969), American policy advisor
