= Men Without Work =

Men Without Work may refer to:

- Men Without Work (film), a 1929 German silent action film
- Men Without Work (book), a 2016 book by Nicholas Eberstadt
