= Dulles–Jackson–Correa Report =

The Dulles–Jackson–Correa Report (also known as Intelligence Survey Group (ISG) and the Dulles Report) was one of the most influential evaluations of the functioning of the United States Intelligence Community, and in particular, the Central Intelligence Agency (CIA). The report focused primarily on the coordination and organization of the CIA and offered suggestions that refined the US intelligence effort in the early stages of the Cold War.

== History ==
=== National Security Act of 1947 ===
As World War II ended, the United States had to decide what to do with regard to its Intelligence structure. Not wanting to relive another Pearl Harbor, and with the growing threat of the Cold War, the United States decided to establish an Intelligence agency that operated continually rather than only during times of war and conflict. The National Security Act of 1947 (signed by President Harry S. Truman on July 26, 1947) implemented a permanent, non-military, Intelligence agency called the Central Intelligence Agency, an agency that evolved out of the Office of Strategic Services (OSS). The CIA was not to be part of the military command structure, nor was it to have a domestic role or police power and was to be under the control of the newly established position of Director of Central Intelligence. In addition to creating the Central Intelligence Agency (CIA), the National Security Act of 1947 established the United States National Security Council (NSC). The National Security Council was composed of the President, Vice President, Secretary of State, Secretary of Defense, Director of the Central Intelligence Agency (now titled, Director of Central Intelligence), and other key members to advise the President on national security and foreign policy matters.

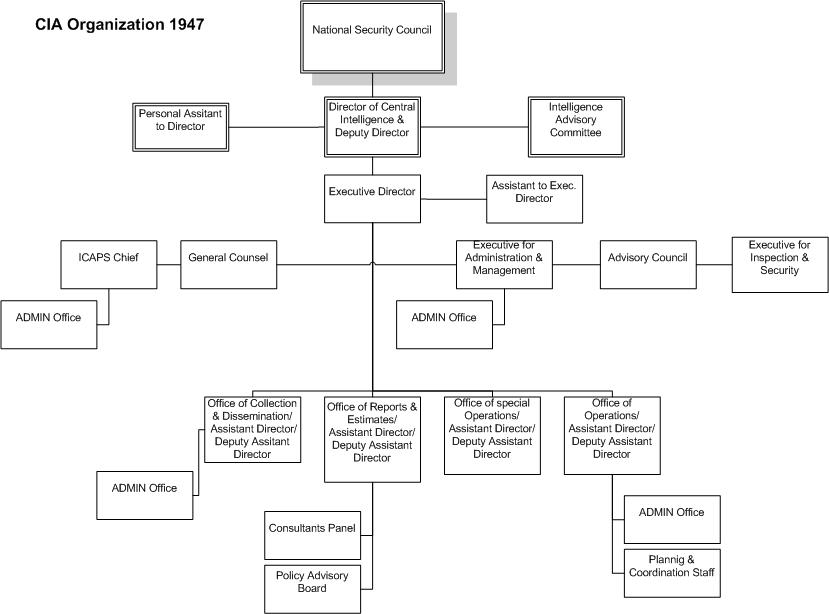
CIA organizational chart, 1947

The National Security Act of 1947 also modified the structure of the United States military. The Act created the Department of the Air Force from the existing United States Army Air Forces as a response to the emerging significance of air power. In addition, the National Security Act merged the War Department and the Navy Department under one department known as the Department of Defense. Although Admiral James Forrestal and the Navy were originally opposed to having a unified Department of Defense, integration allowed for top-level coordination efforts between all three branches and provided a continuing voice for the military as the Secretaries of the three military branches were permanent members on the National Security Council.

=== The First Hoover Commission ===
The First Hoover Commission is also known as the Eberstadt Report and the Task Force on National Security Organization of the First Hoover Commission. Between 1948 and 1949 the U.S. government conducted two investigations into the national intelligence effort as a response to the changing role of the U.S. federal government. Congress passed the first investigation, the First Hoover Commission, unanimously while the second, the Dulles–Jackson–Correa Report, was conducted through the NSC per President Truman's request.

Former President Herbert Hoover was chairman of the 12-member bipartisan Congressional Commission on Organization of the Executive Branch, which was established prior to the passage of the National Security Act of 1947. As part of the commission, the Task Force on National Security Organization (led by Ferdinand Eberstadt) examined the effectiveness of the intelligence agencies and reviewed federal bureaucracy. After a series of hearings, the Hoover Commission submitted a 121-page report written by Eberstadt's task force on January 13, 1949. The Eberstadt Report found that the National Security Act of 1947 soundly constructed the national security organization; however there remained organizational and qualitative inadequacies in national intelligence and the Central Intelligence Agency. The report's biggest criticism concerned the lack of coordination efforts between the CIA, the military, and the State Department that resulted in duplication efforts, and subjective and biased intelligence estimates.

Other key findings of the Eberstadt Report were:

- The CIA must be the central organization of the national intelligence system.
- Within the CIA, at the top echelon, a board should be created with the responsibility of conducting intelligence evaluation.
- A civilian DCI with a long office term is favorable.
- All clandestine operations should be integrated into one CIA office under NSC supervision.
- During times of war, clandestine operations should be the responsibility of the Joint Chiefs of Staff (JCS).
- The CIA's internal structure and personnel system was not organized properly and that departmental responsibilities should be clearer and proper personnel selection and training systems must be established.
- Supported secrecy of the CIA budget to provide administrative flexibility and anonymity.
- Rejected the possibility of handing the FBI's counterintelligence responsibilities over to the CIA.
- An increase in medical and scientific intelligence is necessary.

Despite the efforts of the Eberstadt Report to modify the national intelligence organization, the Dulles–Jackson–Correa Report, submitted to the NSC on January 1, 1949, overshadowed the Task Force on National Security Organization's findings.

== Purpose of the Dulles-Jackson-Correa Report ==
The purpose of the Dulles Report was to "evaluate the CIA's effort and its relationship with other agencies." NSC officials and DCI Roscoe H. Hillenkoetter thought that it was important to review the development of the intelligence system since World War II in order to determine how the NSC should exercise its routine oversight of the CIA. With the development of the industrial war machine and the emergence of a Cold War, America was vulnerable to potentially catastrophic attacks. With the realization that intelligence would serve as the first line of defense, the NSC thought it was necessary that the newly formed CIA's performance was as efficient as possible.

== Membership ==
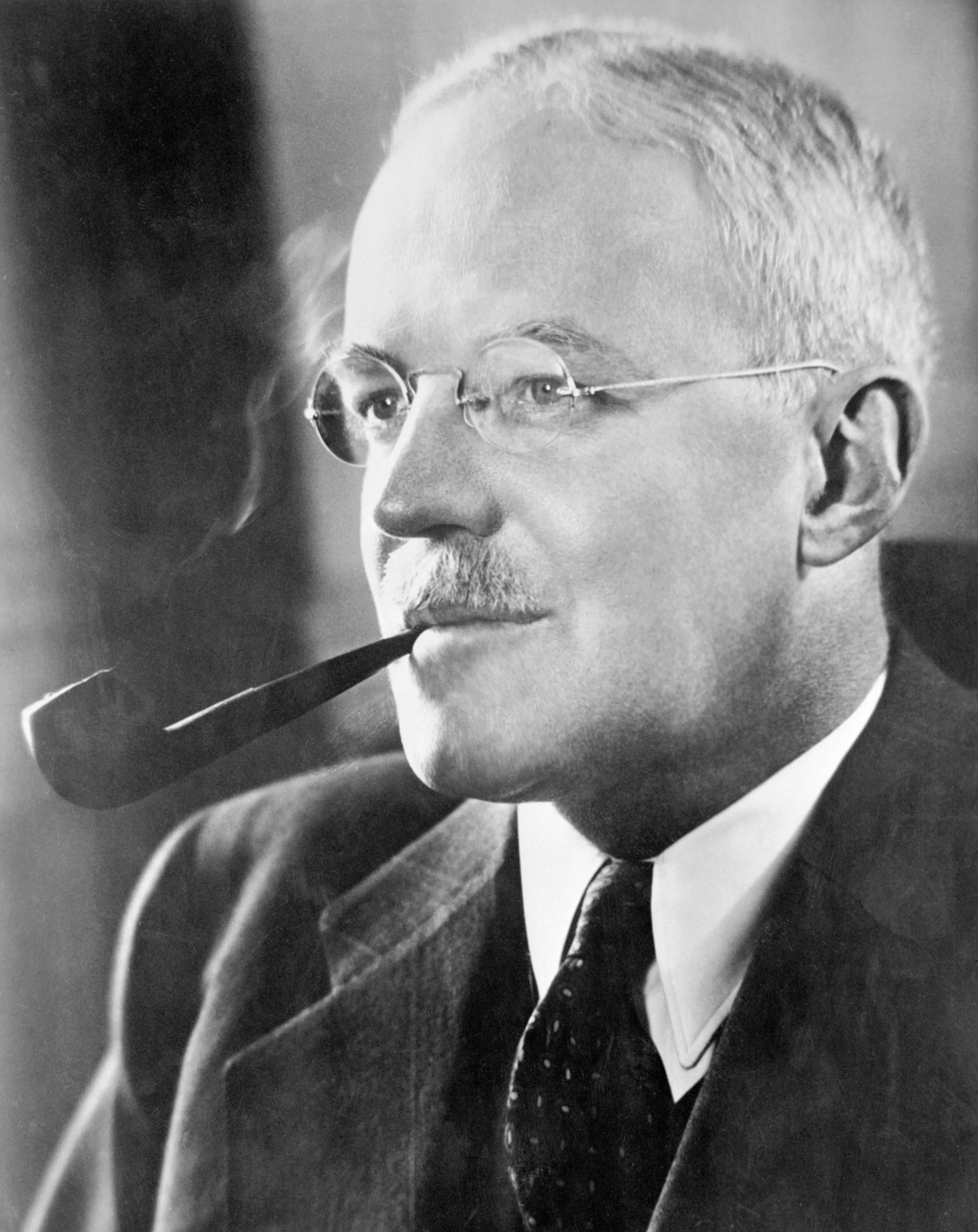
Allen Welsh Dulles

- Allen Welsh Dulles
  - April 7, 1893 – January 28, 1969
  - Princeton University, B.A. 1914, M.A. 1916
  - George Washington University, LL.B. 1926
  - US Diplomatic Service, Department of State, 1916–26
  - Head of Office of Strategic Services (OSS) post in Bern, Switzerland, 1942–45
  - Deputy Director for Plans, CIA, January 4, 1951, to August 23, 1951
  - Deputy DCI August 23, 1951 to February 26, 1953
  - Acting DCI February 9–26, 1953
  - DCI February 26, 1953 – November 29, 1961
  - Member of President's Commission on the Assassination of President Kennedy, 1963–1964
- William Harding Jackson
  - March 25, 1901 – September 28, 1971
  - Princeton University, B.A. 1924
  - Harvard University, LL.B. 1928
  - New York Lawyer and Investment banker
  - US Army, 1942–1945
  - Intelligence staff of General Omar Bradley, 1944
  - Deputy DCI October 7, 1950 to August 3, 1951
  - Part-time special assistant and senior consultant to DCI, Aug 1951- Feb 1956
  - Special Assistant to President Dwight D. Eisenhower, various assignments in national security field, 1956–57
- Mathias Correa
  - US District Attorney for the Southern District of New York, 1941- 1943
  - Former assistant to James V. Forrestal when Forrestal served as the Secretary of the Navy during World War II

== Objectives ==
The objective of the Dulles Report was to report discrepancies with the organization and procedure of the CIA and make appropriate recommendations. In addition, the Dulles Report was to examine other government departments and agencies with activities that relate to national security, and make recommendations that would increase operation and overall coordination between agencies and departments (something that the Eberstadt Report did not do).

== Findings ==
Dulles, Jackson, and Correa submitted their findings to the NSC on January 1, 1949, in a 193-page report. Echoing many of the shortcomings addressed in the Eberstadt Report, the Dulles report gave 56 recommendations and, in general, was mainly critical to the CIA and the DCI. It stated that the CIA was not effectively meeting the conditions for which the Agency was established.

The principal defect of the Central Intelligence Agency is that its direction, administrative organization and performance do not show sufficient appreciation of the Agency's assigned functions, particularly in the fields of intelligence coordination and the production of intelligence estimates. The result has been that the Central Intelligence Agency has tended to become just one more intelligence agency producing intelligence in competition with older established agencies of the Government departments.

Another finding was that the CIA was "the weak link in the system" due to shortcomings in direction from the DCI (Hillenkoetter). In essence, the Dulles Report was accusing Hillenkoetter of not effectively coordinating intelligence efforts among agencies and departments with national security interests. In addition to a lack of coordination efforts, the Dulles Report found that the CIA was failing with its production of national intelligence, and in particular, National Intelligence Estimates (NIE). To correct this problem, the report suggested creating an "Estimates Division" that would be composed of a select group of individuals with a high-level of experience that would review specialized intelligence to create the NIE. In addition, "all of the principle intelligence agencies were to participate in and approve them," making them the most authoritative and available to policymakers.

Covert operations was another focal point of the Report. With little open source information available from communist nations, the US would have to use clandestine operations to obtain vital information. The Dulles Report suggested the incorporation of covert and clandestine intelligence into one single office within the CIA, therefore the Office of Special Operations (OSO), responsible for clandestine intelligence collection, and the Office of Policy Coordination (OPC), responsible for covert actions, should integrate into a single division.

The personnel situation at the CIA was of concern to the Dulles Report as well. In particular, internal security, high turnover rates of employees, and a large number of military personnel were of concern. The Dulles Report suggested that the DCI should be of a civilian status and that military personnel should resign their positions in order to add to continuity and to maintain independence from other agencies

== Changes to the Intelligence Community ==
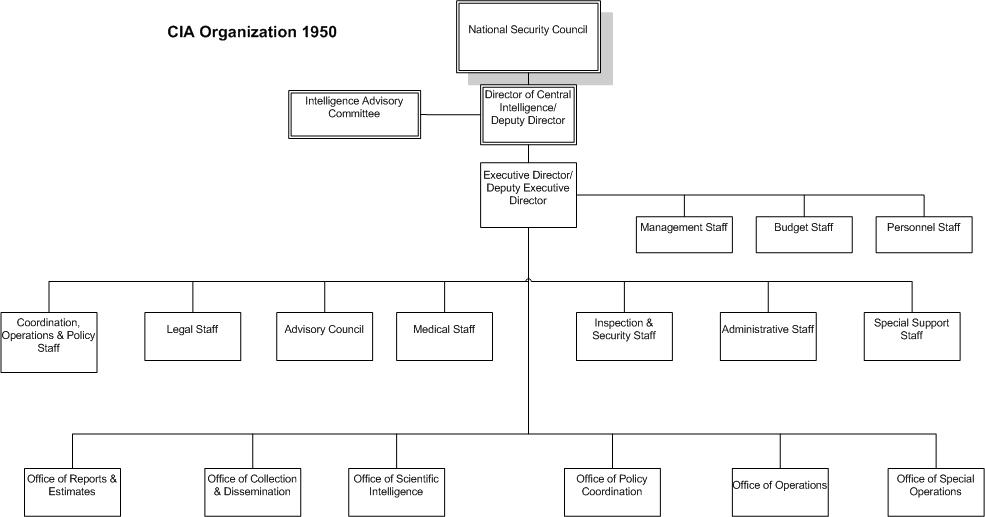
CIA organizational chart, 1950

The implementation of the Dulles–Jackson–Correa Report recommendations began in the late 1950s after President Truman forced DCI Hillenkoetter to resign due to the latter's failure to foresee the North Korean invasion of South Korea in June 1950. On October 7, 1950, President Truman appointed Lt. General Walter Bedell Smith ("Beetle Smith") as the new DCI who in turn hired William Harding Jackson as his deputy director of Central Intelligence (DDCI). Using recommendations from the Dulles Report, DCI Smith quickly reorganized the CIA's Office of Reports and Estimates (ORE) into three units. The first unit was to focus on national intelligence and became known as the Office of National Estimates. The second unit, the Office of Current Intelligence, had a current intelligence role, and produced the daily bulletin for the President. The Last unit, the Office of Research and Reports, was to conduct a basic intelligence function and focus on intelligence analysis that was more strategic in nature and beyond the scope of any of the established intelligence agencies. The reorganization greatly reduced confusion that had previously occurred regarding the analytic mission of the CIA.

DCI Smith demonstrated the type of leadership the Dulles Report required of that position. Smith's contribution to the Intelligence Community as DCI was praised because he used his latent authority to lead the intelligence establishment rather than go along with what other agencies had been doing. In essence, the Dulles Report's recommendations, and DCI Smith's execution of these recommendations became the blueprint for the future organization and the operation of the CIA.

== See also ==
- Central Intelligence Agency
- National Intelligence Estimate
- Director of Central Intelligence
- Allen Welsh Dulles
- William Harding Jackson
- Roscoe H. Hillenkoetter
- Walter Bedell Smith
- Armed Forces Security Agency
