= Frederick Eberstadt =

American photographer (1926–2023)

Frederick Eberstadt (July 24, 1926 – July 29, 2023) was an American fashion photographer and psychotherapist. He was the father of political economist Nicholas Eberstadt and novelist Fernanda Eberstadt.

Eberstadt was born in Huntington, New York on July 24, 1926. He first worked for Eberstadt & Company, his father’s firm. He then worked in television, and then became the assistant to Richard Avedon. He photographed the 1960s bohemian scene and wrote for Women’s Wear Daily. "[A]fter surviving a crippling major depressive disorder, [he] decided to leave behind a decades-long career as a fashion photographer and photojournalist to become a psychotherapist". He died on July 29, 2023, at the age of 97.
