= National Center for Medical Intelligence =

Military medical intelligence agency of the United States

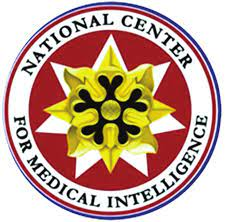
- Seal of the NCMI

Agency overview
- Formed: April 1, 1973; 53 years ago (as US Army Medical Intelligence and Information Agency (1973-82), Armed Forces Medical Intelligence Center (1982-2008), became National Center for Medical Intelligence in 2008)
- Preceding agencies: US Army Medical Information and Intelligence Agency (1956-early 1970s); Medical intelligence office under Army Surgeon General, multiple names (at least WWII-1956)
- Type: Component of departmental agency (since 1992)
- Jurisdiction: Federal agency operating in US, but analyzing foreign and domestic intelligence
- Headquarters: Fort Detrick, Frederick, Maryland, U.S.; 39°26′7″N 77°25′45″W
- Employees: 100-150
- Agency executives: Col. R. Shane Day, Director; Christopher M. Strub, Deputy Director
- Parent department: United States Department of Defense (DIA also member of USIC)
- Parent agency: Defense Intelligence Agency (DIA)

The National Center for Medical Intelligence (NCMI), formerly known as the Armed Forces Medical Intelligence Center, is a component of the United States Defense Intelligence Agency (DIA) responsible for the production of medical intelligence and all-source intelligence on foreign health threats and other medical issues to protect U.S. interests worldwide. Headquartered at Fort Detrick, Maryland, the center provides finished intelligence products to the Department of Defense, U.S. Intelligence Community, Five Eyes, NATO, allies and partners, as well as international health organizations and NGOs.

As of April 2020, NCMI is led by director Colonel R. Shane Day and deputy director Christopher M. Strub.

== History ==
The NCMI traces its origins to the organization of a medical intelligence section in the Office of the Surgeon General of the United States Army during World War II. Prior to entry into the war, the surgeon general established medical intelligence to support planning for the administration of military governments in U.S. Army occupied territories occupied by providing detailed guides for civil public health and sanitation conditions. As the prospect of United States entry into the war increased, the need for a full-time staff of medical intelligence analysts became apparent. During the war, medical intelligence products were part of formal war planning with the incorporation of health and sanitary data into War Department Strategic Surveys. The history and organization of the medical intelligence program in 1951 is described in detail Special Text, ST 8039–1, 1951, used at the Army Medical Service School.

The US Army Medical Information and Intelligence Agency was organized at Walter Reed Army Medical Center (WRAMC) by WRAMC General Orders 62, 24 September 1956. It was created by transferring personnel and files from the Medical Intelligence Division and the Reference Library of the Office the Surgeon General of the United States Army. Although both were abbreviated MIIA, this Medical Information and Intelligence Agency should not be confused with the Medical Intelligence and Information Agency which was organized effective 1 April 1973.

According to a historical summary from the Armed Forces Medical Intelligence Center, the Medical Information and Intelligence Agency was absorbed by the Defense Intelligence Agency (DIA) in 1962. During the later Cold War, the medical intelligence division underwent several evolutions in size, structure and specific function. In the early 1970s, the division became victim of DoD downsizing initiatives after the Vietnam War.

On April 1, 1973, the Army surgeon general again took sole responsibility for the medical intelligence function in the form of the US Army Medical Intelligence and Information Agency (USAMIIA or MIIA). MIIA transferred to Fort Detrick in 1979 and was renamed as AFMIC in 1982 when it became a tri-service organization. Congress mandated the permanent transfer of AFMIC to DIA in 1992 under the DoD Authorization Act. As of January 1992, AFMIC became a DIA field production activity.

On July 2, 2008, AFMIC was formally redesignated as the NCMI in a ceremony at Ft. Detrick. In 2010, the center received a facility expansion that added workspaces, conference and training rooms, and additional parking.

== Organization ==
The NCMI is led by a director, Col. R. Shane Day of the United States Air Force as of April 2020. The director is assisted by a deputy director, as of April 2020, Christopher M. Strub. NCMI has a total of four major divisions, those being Infectious Disease, Environmental Health, Global Health Systems, and Medical Science and Technology. The NCMI is organized into a support division and two substantive divisions—the Epidemiology and Environmental Health Division and the Medical Capabilities Division. Each substantive division is made up of two teams, the duties of which include:

Environmental Health

- Identify and assess environmental risks that can degrade force health or effectiveness including chemical and microbial contamination of the environment, toxic industrial, chemical and radiation accidents, and environmental terrorism/warfare.
- Assess the impact of foreign environmental health issues and trends on environmental security and national policy.

Epidemiology

- Identify, assess, and report on infectious disease risks that can degrade mission effectiveness of deployed forces and/or cause long-term health implications.
- Alert operational and policy customers to foreign disease outbreaks that have implications for national security and policy formulation, including homeland defense and deliberately introduced versus naturally occurring disease outbreaks.

Life Sciences and Biotechnology

- Assess foreign basic and applied biomedical and biotechnological developments of military medical importance.
- Assess foreign civilian and military pharmaceutical industry capabilities.
- Assess foreign scientific and technological medical advances for defense against nuclear, biological and chemical warfare.
- Prevent technological surprise.
- Prevent proliferation of dual-use equipment and knowledge.

Medical Capabilities

- Assess foreign military and civilian medical capabilities, including treatment facilities, medical personnel, emergency and disaster response, logistics, and medical/pharmaceutical industries.
- Maintain and update an integrated data base on all medical treatment, training, pharmaceutical, and research and production facilities.

=== Director of NCMI ===
The directorship of NCMI was historically held "primarily by military officers;" only two civilians have ever occupied the position. Past directors include medical doctor, former undercover CIA officer, and Air Force colonel Dr. Anthony Rizzo, who held the position for eight years before retiring in 2013; and former Army doctor and NCMI infectious disease intelligence analyst Dr. Kathryn Morici, the center's first female and second civilian director, who took office in February 2014 but was, by at least April 2021, replaced by R. Shane Day.

There is also a deputy director of NCMI; Christopher M. Strub served or serves as Day's deputy.

==== Directors of NCMI starting 2005 ====
The following is an incomplete list of NCMI directors starting in 2005. NCMI had one civilian/non-military director prior to 2005 and every director pre-2014 was male.

Director	Term of office
Col. Dr. Anthony Rizzo	2005 – 2013
Dr. Kathryn Morici	February 2014 – Before April 2020
Col. Dr. R. Shane Day	Before April 2020 – Unknown

== Operations ==
A former NCMI director described its mission as "[predicting] what would be a threat to the United States;" the secretary of the Navy stated it as "to act as the focal point in the DoD for compiling, producing, and distributing finished intelligence on foreign military and civilian medical capabilities, medical intelligence products and assessments." Customers range from operational and tactical commanders, preventive medicine personnel, and medical planners and researchers to the policymakers in the United States Department of Defense, the White House staff and other federal agencies. The mission grew during Operation Enduring Freedom and Operation Iraqi Freedom.

News reports indicated that NCMI produces medical intelligence analysis using intelligence products from other intelligence community agencies with a heavy emphasis on open-source intelligence, such as foreign newspaper reports and social media posts. Former NCMI senior officer Denis Kaufman described the center's search through massive amounts of information as "like...looking for needles in a stack of needles." The NCMI does not collect any intelligence of its own and its products primarily serve the US military and commanders, policymakers, defense officials, and health officials such as the secretary of health and human services.

While the US Central Intelligence Agency also has a medical intelligence unit, the NCMI is the primary organization for classified COVID-19 pandemic information and analysis. The center is also the primary source of federal medical intelligence as a whole.

NCMI's director is charged with acting as "the Medical Intelligence consultant to the Army, Navy, and Air Force Surgeons General. [He or she] briefs at the White House, to Congress, to the Homeland Security Committee, to the Director of National Intelligence and to the Under Secretary of Defense for Intelligence".

In a 2013 edition of The Intelligencer, a journal published by the Association of Former Intelligence Officers (AFIO), Johnathan D. Clemente stated the NCMI had approximately 150 employees (counting on-site analysts from other intelligence agencies), the same number reported in 2008. In 2020, AP News estimated the NCMI employs "at least 100 epidemiologists, virologists, chemical engineers, toxicologists, biologists and military medical expert[s] — all schooled in intelligence trade craft;" also represented are "medical doctors, veterinarians and other experts with extensive operational medical experience from the military services".

== 2020-2021 COVID-19 Pandemic ==
In April 2020, ABC News reported that the White House was warned of the impending COVID-19 pandemic in Wuhan, China, through a National Center for Medical Intelligence Report. In a rare public statement to ABC News, the Center denied this:

"As a matter of practice the National Center for Medical Intelligence does not comment publicly on specific intelligence matters. However, in the interest of transparency during this current public health crisis, we can confirm that media reporting about the existence/release of a National Center for Medical Intelligence Coronavirus-related product/assessment in November 2019 is not correct. No such NCMI product exists."

The National Center for Medical Intelligence was thought to be part of the daily pandemic briefings of the White House:

"The value that NCMI brings is that it has access to information streams that the World Health Organization does not have, nor does the Centers for Disease Control or anyone else," said Denis Kaufman, a retired senior officer who worked at the NCMI. In normal times, the NCMI's primary customer is the U.S. military, which uses the information to monitor potential health threats to its forces abroad. But in the midst of a pandemic, NCMI analysis is likely a fixture in the president's daily intelligence briefing, officials say.

== See also ==
- Medical intelligence
- Defense Intelligence Agency
