= Varble =

Varble is a surname. Notable people with the surname include:

- Stephen Varble (1946–1984), American performance artist
- Wynn Varble, American singer-songwriter
