= Eberstadt Report =

1949 study on the United States intelligence community

The Eberstadt Report, officially known as the Task Force Report on National Security Organization, was a study conducted by the United States government which evaluated the structure and operations of the United States Department of Defense and United States Intelligence Community. The report was created by the Task Force on National Security Organization, chaired by Ferdinand Eberstadt, from 1948–49 under the Commission on Organization of the Executive Branch of the Government, also known as the First Hoover Commission. The most important findings of the report include recommendations for better cooperation within the US Intelligence Community, improvement in the internal structure and operations of the Central Intelligence Agency (CIA), and the growing need for the development of scientific intelligence in the background of the Cold War. Despite its submission to US Congress, the report was not widely read due to being overshadowed by the Intelligence Survey Group and its report, the Dulles Report.

== Background ==
=== The Eberstadt Report of 1945 ===
There was created in December 1944 a very active Committee which had provided a much-needed working link between the military and those responsible for foreign policy. Until the end of the war the existence of this committee, the State-War-Navy Coordinating Committee, has been a classified "congfidential" subject. By the end of the War, the "Eberstadt Report" proposed a post-war security organization which would include a National Security Council which would take over the functions performed by the SWNCC. This was the original "Eberstadt Report", a report to the Honorable James Forrestal on Unification of the War and Navy Departments and Postwar Organization for National Security.

=== The National Security Act of 1947 ===
As the U.S. emerged from World War II as a global power, it decided it needed a more permanent intelligence community. In 1945, both President Harry Truman and the Joint Chief of Staff believed the national defense and intelligence capabilities of the U.S. needed to be reorganized quickly. What resulted was the National Security Act of 1947, signed on July 26, 1947, which created the United States National Security Council (NSC), CIA and Director of Central Intelligence (DCI), and unified the Armed Services under the Department of Defense.

=== First Hoover Commission ===
Prior to the passage of the National Security Act of 1947, Congress created a 12-member, bi-partisan commission, the Commission on Organization of the Executive Branch of the Government, chaired by former President Herbert Hoover. The commission's purpose was to examine the organization and operations of various arms of the executive branch of the US government and make appropriate recommendations for improvement through various task forces. On May 21, 1948, Herbert Hoover announced the creation of the Task Force on the National Security Organization, which would be chaired by Ferdinand Eberstadt and produce the Eberstadt Report. From June 1948 through January 1949, Eberstadt's task force examined the workings of the country's entire national security and intelligence system, including extensive research on the US Department of Defense. On January 13, 1949, the Hoover Commission submitted a 121-page document outlining criticisms and recommendations for the nation's national security and intelligence organizations. Within the first few pages the Eberstadt report states that “the National Security Organization, established by the National Security Act of 1947, is, on the whole, soundly constructed, but is not yet working well."

==== Task force members ====
Ferdinand Eberstadt

- Ferdinand Eberstadt – Chairman
- Dr. Raymond B. Allen
- Thomas Archer
- Hanson W. Baldwin
- Chester I. Barnard
- Dr. Charles W. Cole
- John Cowles
- James Knowlson
- John J. McCloy
- Dr. Fredrick A. Middlebush
- Robert P. Patterson
- Lewis L. Strauss
- J. Carlton Ward Jr.
- Gen. Robert E. Wood

== Recommendations ==
=== Cooperation in the US intelligence community ===
The central concern of the task force was lack of cooperation within the US Intelligence Community. Specifically, it cited the poor relationship of the CIA to G-2 of the US Army, the Federal Bureau of Investigation (FBI), the Atomic Energy Commission, and the US State Department. According to the report, this poor relationship had caused an unsatisfactory number of “disparate intelligence estimates,” which “have often been subjective and biased.” Lastly, the report encouraged older entities in the US Intelligence Community to embrace the newly created CIA as a partner.

=== Central Intelligence Agency ===
==== Leadership in the community ====
The report expected that the CIA would become the “central organization of the national intelligence system” through creating a community-wide intelligence review board and leading covert activities. It recommended the CIA create “within the agency at the top echelon an evaluation board or section composed of competent and experienced personnel who would have no administrative responsibilities and whose duties would be confined solely to intelligence evaluation.” Eberstadt's task force felt this was necessary because the highest administrators within the CIA had little time to evaluate intelligence. This evaluation board would answer directly to the Director of Central Intelligence but would only have advisory status. Believing responsibility for covert activities should fall under one entity, the Eberstadt Report stated the CIA, under supervision of the National Security Council, should lead such operations, unless in time of war. In time of war, the report recommended responsibility for covert activities should switch to the control of the Joint Chief of Staff.

==== Internal structure and personnel ====
According to the report, “the Central Intelligence Agency is sound in principle, but improvement is needed in practice.” The report identified problems with departmental responsibilities, specifically that of the Office of Collection and Dissemination. According to the report, such offices and departments should be evaluated and appropriate changes implemented to make those components of the CIA more effective. The report also noted the CIA suffered from high numbers of inadequately trained and inexperienced personnel caused by quick expansion after its creation. However, the report acknowledged that these were internal problems that could only be solved with time and training. In the debate over who should become the DCI, the report recommended a civilian hold the position in order to bring “a broader background and greater versatility and diplomatic experience than is usually found in service personnel.”

==== Budget process ====
The report also supported a Congressional bill that would have set into law the procedures that maintained the secrecy of the intelligence budget process, specifically that of the CIA. According to the report, this would allow “administrative flexibility and anonymity that are essential to satisfactory intelligence.”

=== Other recommendations ===
==== Scientific intelligence ====
The report recognized that the nation's ability to collect and disseminate scientific intelligence was unsatisfactory. At the time of the task force's activities, the responsibility for scientific intelligence was scattered throughout the community. Some in the intelligence community such as the State Department and Defense Department were known for their territorialism over the responsibility. Another common problem for the CIA and the rest of the community was finding quality scientists willing to forgo a higher salary and name recognition to serve the scientific needs of the intelligence community. Due to these problems, the report encouraged the Central Intelligence Agency and the Research and Development Board to assign a specific entity “to collect, collate, and evaluate scientific and medical intelligence, in order that our present glaring deficiencies in this field be promptly eliminated.” This central authority for collecting and disseminating scientific intelligence would have included developing fields such as biological and chemical weapons, electronics, aerodynamics, and missile technology. While medical intelligence was relatively underdeveloped and responsibility was shared among several agencies, cooperation in that area between agencies was expected to increase. These recommendations were deemed necessary due to bureaucratic restraints which prevented the Scientific Branch of the CIA from effectively executing its function.

==== Professionalism ====
The report also questioned the quality of military intelligence professionals. Specifically, the report criticized the “somewhat haphazard method employed by the services in the selection of officers for important intelligence posts.” The report pointed out that in recent years, several chiefs of Army intelligence lacked previous experience. The committee also suggested that the military services should establish intelligence careers as an option for serviceman.

== Impact ==
An official CIA history suggests the recommendations and suggestions contained in the Eberstadt Report influenced very little in the national security structure or intelligence community. Although Congress authorized the First Hoover Commission and its national security task force, Congress did not initiate or enforce any of its recommendations. Also, at the same time Eberstadt's task force was completing its research and report for Congress, the Intelligence Survey Group was conducting similar research and produced its own report, the Dulles Report, which was submitted to Congress January 1, 1949. The Dulles Report became better known and forced the Eberstadt Report to be almost completely overlooked. While the CIA suggests at least some of the Eberstadt Report's ideas were used, it is unlikely the report was widely read or had any significant influence.

== See also ==
- Central Intelligence Agency
- Ferdinand Eberstadt
- Dulles-Jackson-Correa Report
- Joint Chief of Staff
