= Committee on Interior and Insular Affairs =

Committee on Interior and Insular Affairs may refer to:

- United States House Committee on Interior and Insular Affairs (1951–1991)
- United States Senate Committee on Interior and Insular Affairs (1948–1977)

== See also ==
- Homeland Security Committee (disambiguation)
