= Fernanda Eberstadt =

American writer

- Born: November 10, 1960 (age 66); New York City, U.S.
- Education: Magdalen College, Oxford (BA)
- Occupations: Novelist; essayist; critic
- Spouse: Alastair Meddon Oswald Bruton (m. 1993)
- Children: 2
- Relatives: Ferdinand Eberstadt (paternal grandfather), Ogden Nash (maternal grandfather), Esther Eberstadt Brooke (paternal grandaunt), Nick Eberstadt (brother), Mary Eberstadt (sister-in-law)
- Writing career
- Language: English
- Website: fernandaeberstadt.com

Fernanda "Nenna" Eberstadt (born 1960 in New York City) is an American writer living in France.

== Early life ==
Eberstadt is the daughter of two patrons of New York City's avant-garde, Frederick Eberstadt, a fashion photographer and psychotherapist, and Isabel Nash Eberstadt, a writer. Her paternal grandfather was Ferdinand Eberstadt, a Wall Street financier and adviser to presidents; her maternal grandfather was the poet Ogden Nash. One of her brothers, Nicholas Eberstadt, is a scholar at the American Enterprise Institute.

She went to the Brearley School in New York City. As a teenager, she worked at Andy Warhol's Factory and for Diana Vreeland at the Metropolitan Museum of Art. Her first published piece was a profile in Andy Warhol's Interview Magazine in 1979 of the travel writer Bruce Chatwin.

At age eighteen, Eberstadt moved to the United Kingdom, where she was one of the first women to attend Magdalen College, Oxford, from which she graduated in 1982.

== Writing career ==
In 1985, Alfred A. Knopf, Inc. published the 25-year-old Eberstadt's first novel, Low Tide, which told the story of Jezebel, daughter of an English art dealer and a mad Louisiana heiress, and her fatal love affair with two young brothers. It takes place in New York, Oxford, and Mexico. Praise for her work landed her an interview with intellectual William F. Buckley on his television program, Firing Line, where she appeared with Bret Easton Ellis, who had published Less than Zero the same year.

Her next novel, Isaac and His Devils, came in 1991 and was also widely acclaimed, described by Library Journal as a "rich novel, full of promise for the author's future". Set in rural New Hampshire, the novel is about Isaac Hooker, a half-deaf, half-blind, hugely fat and ambitious boy-genius and his struggle to fulfill his parents' blighted dreams.

Her third novel, published in 1997 and set in the late 1980s New York art world, was When the Sons of Heaven Meet the Daughters of the Earth. It recounted the rise and fall of the young painter, Isaac Hooker.

Eberstadt began writing essays and criticism for such publications as Commentary, The New Yorker, Vogue, The New York Times Magazine, and Vanity Fair. Her widely cited essay "The Palace and the City", about the Sicilian writer Giuseppe Tomasi di Lampedusa and the politics of urban restoration in Palermo, was published in the December 23, 1991, issue of The New Yorker. Writer Daniel Mendelsohn cited Eberstadt's essay as his all-time favorite piece in The New Yorker.

In more recent years, she has worked extensively for The New York Times Magazine, publishing profiles of the Nobel Prize-winning novelist Orhan Pamuk, of Moroccan-based Spanish writer Juan Goytisolo, and the Portuguese novelist José Saramago, as well as of indie-rock group CocoRosie. Her work also appeared in Architectural Digest, Granta, The European Review of Books.

Following her pattern of a six-year interval between novels, Eberstadt published The Furies in 2003. Praised by Kirkus Reviews, Booklist, Publishers Weekly, and The New York Times Book Review, fellow writer Bret Easton Ellis called it "spellbinding", and The New York Observer said "The Furies veers pretty close to genius."

John Updike, reviewing Little Money Street in The New Yorker, described Eberstadt as "ambitious, resourceful novelist".

In 2024, Eberstadt published with Europa Editions a cultural memoir called Bite Your Friends: Stories of the Body Militant. In it, she discusses, in relation to herself, people in the arts, including Stephen Varble, Pussy Riot, Petr Pavlensky, and Pier Paolo Pasolini.

== Life in France ==
In 1998, Eberstadt went to live on a vineyard in the French Pyrenees, outside the city of Perpignan. She became friends with a family of French gypsy musicians. Her first work of non-fiction, Little Money Street: In Search of Gypsies and Their Music in the South of France, which portrays that friendship, was released by Knopf in March 2006. Lucy Sante called the book "passionate, intimate, at once exhilarating and despairing, a rich and profound work of high nonfiction literature. A portrait of the Gypsies of southwestern France, it is also about family, about consumerism, and about the ruthlessness of a world in which there is no more open world."

Eberstadt and her husband, Alastair Meddon Oswald Bruton, a journalist whom she married on June 5, 1993, live in France; they have two children.

Eberstadt's sixth book, a novel called RAT, was published by Alfred A. Knopf in March 2010. RAT tells the story of a 15 year-old girl who set off on a journey from rural France to London, with her adopted brother in search of her birth father and a better life. Booklist called it "mythic, gritty and unforgettable". Cathleen Medwick in The New York Times Book Review praises Eberstadt's "shrewd and sensuous fifth novel." Medwick hails Eberstadt's preoccupation with "the footloose life of the wilfully dispossessed" and writes that "in her novels, idealists and fast trackers wrestle with thorny problems of love and social identity." *

== Works ==
- Low Tide, Alfred A. Knopf, 1985. ISBN 978-0394544298
- Isaac And His Devils. Alfred A. Knopf. 1991. ISBN 0394584961.
- When the Sons of Heaven Meet the Daughters of the Earth, Harvill Panther, 1997. ISBN 9781860464416
- The Furies: A Novel, Knopf Doubleday Publishing Group, 2003. ISBN 9780375412561
- Little Money Street: In Search of Gypsies and Their Music in the South of France, Random House LLC, 2006. ISBN 9780307487575
- Rat. Knopf Doubleday Publishing Group. 2009. ISBN 978-0-307-47239-7. Review
- Bite Your Friends: Stories of the Body Militant, Europa Editions, 2024. ISBN 979-8-88966-006-4. Review
