= US Army Medical Information and Intelligence Agency =

The US Army Medical Information and Intelligence Agency (MIIA) was small special-purpose intelligence agency assigned to the surgeon general of the United States Army. It was officially organized at Walter Reed Army Medical Center (WRAMC) by WRAMC GO 62, 1956.

== History ==
The agency was created by transferring personnel and files from the Medical Intelligence Division and the Reference Library of the Office the Surgeon General of the United States Army. Although both were abbreviated MIIA, this Medical Information and Intelligence Agency should not be confused with the Medical Intelligence and Information Agency which was organized in 1973.

Apparently the name of the agency was changed to the "US Army Medical Intelligence and Information Agency." According to a list of tenants of Arlington Hall Station, Virginia, in 1958, the "US Army Medical Information and Intelligence Agency" was relocated to Arlington Hall Station, Arlington, VA, on March 28, 1958.

According to a brief historical summary from the Armed Forces Medical Intelligence Center, the Medical Information and Intelligence Agency was absorbed by DIA in 1963.
