= Medical intelligence =

Military intelligence concerning medical information

Medical Intelligence (MEDINT) is defined by the United States Department of Defense as:

That category of intelligence resulting from collection, evaluation, analysis, and interpretation of foreign medical, bio-scientific, and environmental information that is of interest to strategic planning and to military medical planning and operations for the conservation of the fighting strength of friendly forces and the formation of assessments of foreign medical capabilities in both military and civilian sectors. Also called MEDINT.

== NCMI ==
The National Center for Medical Intelligence ("NCMI"), formerly the Armed Forces Medical Intelligence Center ("AFMIC") located at Fort Detrick, Maryland is a field production agency of the Defense Intelligence Agency. NCMI has primary responsibility for medical intelligence within the Department of Defense.

== External sources ==
- "The Literature of Intelligence: A Bibliography of Materials, with Essays, Reviews, and Comments"
- See also "AFMIC" by Lynn McNamee
