= Ferdinand Eberstadt (mayor) =

German businessman and politician

Ferdinand Falk Eberstadt (14 January 1808 – 9 February 1888) was a businessman and liberal politician in Worms in the Grand Duchy of Hesse, who became the first Jewish mayor in Germany.

In the 1830s and 1840s, Eberstadt became a successful textile merchant and a leader of the Jewish community of Worms. He was a supporter of Reform Judaism and a political liberal. In the 1848 Revolution became one of the leaders of the democratic faction in Worms and subsequently served as mayor of Worms from 1849 to 1852. He briefly held a seat in the Hessian parliament in 1850 and in the Worms district council in 1852, but was repeatedly prosecuted on charges of high treason and finally stripped of office by ministerial decree in 1852.

In 1857, Eberstadt and his family moved to Mannheim in the Grand Duchy of Baden, where he established a new textile company, patronised the arts, and was a member of the managing committee of the German Progress Party. He died on 9 February 1888 in Mannheim, where he and his wife are buried in the Jewish cemetery.

== Life ==
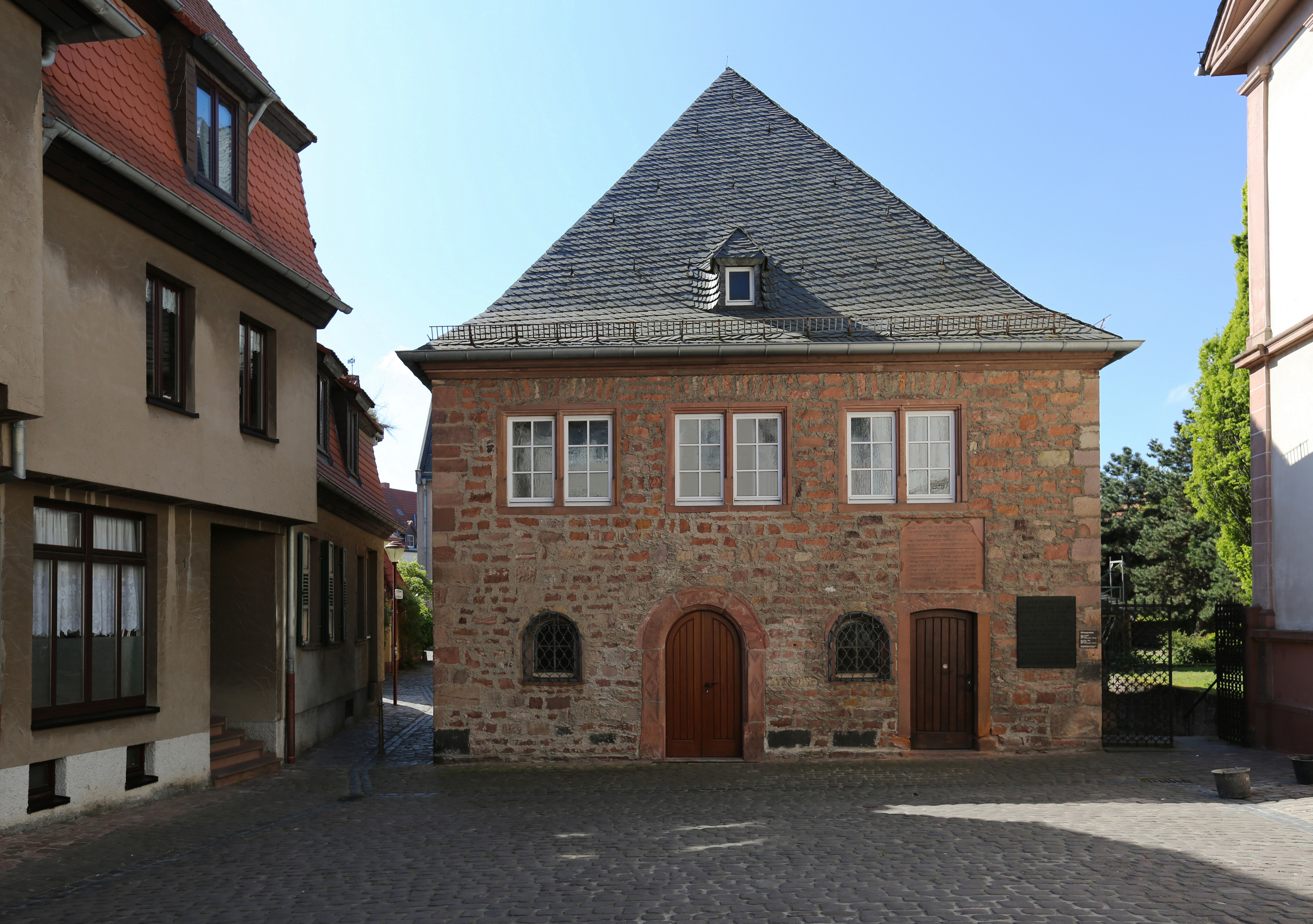
Worms Synagogue.

Eberstadt was born in Worms on 14 January 1808 to a Jewish family, which attested in Worms from the seventeenth century. His parents were Amschel Löb (August Ludwig) Eberstadt (1771–1839) and Esther Gernsheim (1775–1819). He attended the Wormser Secondary School and then entered his father's textile and haberdashery business. He held the Handlungsvollmacht (power of attorney) over the business from 1 March 1828 and, on 1 February 1839, he and his brothers inherited the company following their father's death. At this point the Eberstadts were one of the richest Jewish families in Worms. On 10 January 1837, he married Sara Zelie Seligmann.

From 1840 until 1847, Eberstadt was a member of the board of the Jewish community of Worms and he was one of the Wormser Jews who supported the liberalisation of Jewish religious services. In 1842, Passover was the first Jewish service held in the German language and - also for the first time - men and women were not separated in the Worms Synagogue.

In 1847, Eberstadt was elected to the jury of the court of assizes in Mainz. In the same period, he was a member of the IHK für Rheinhessen, the province's chamber of commerce.

=== Revolution of 1848 ===
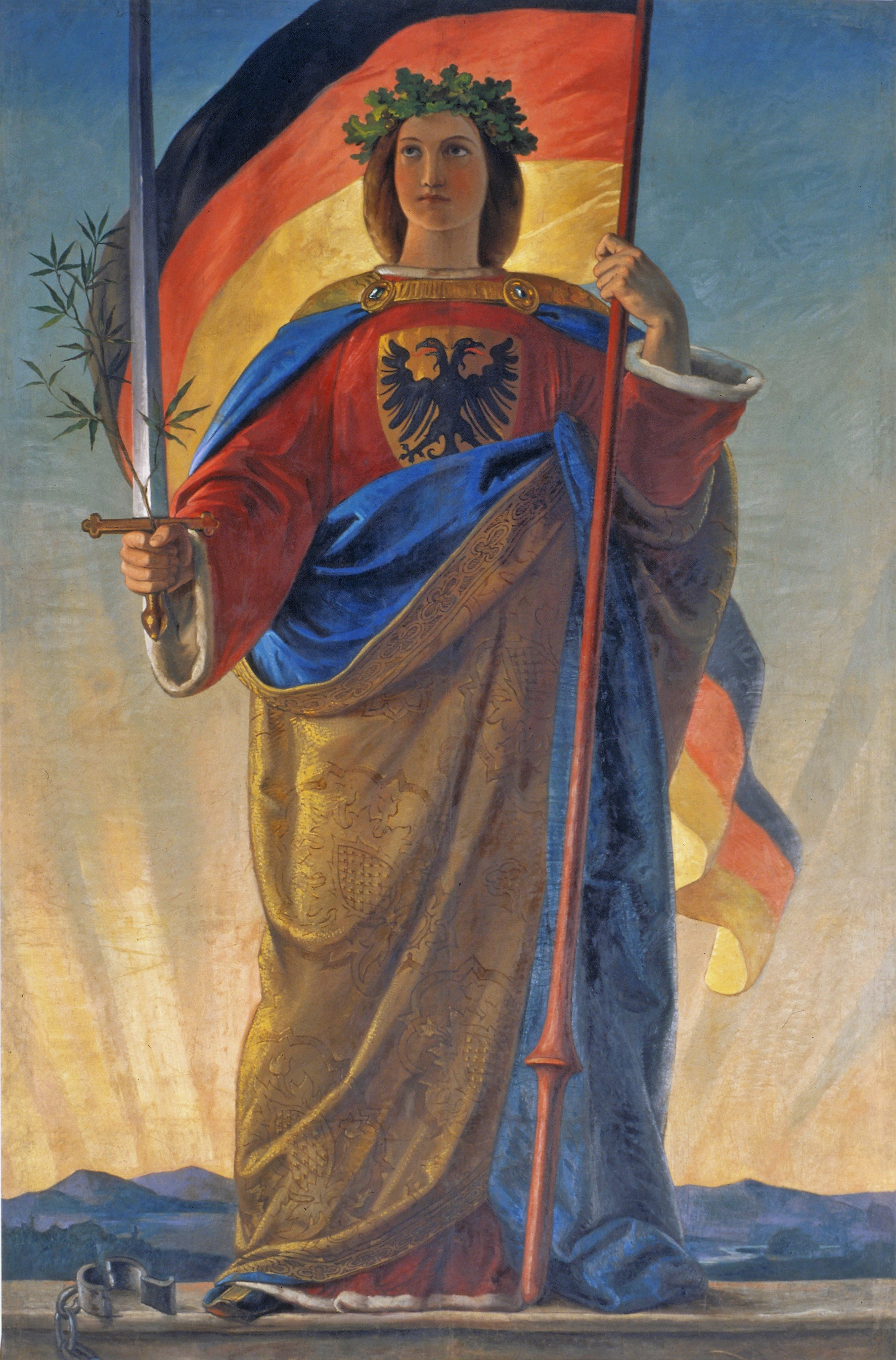
Germania, an allegorical painting hung in the Frankfurt Parliament during the Revolution of 1848.

In the course of the Revolution of 1848, two political groupings developed in Worms. Eberstadt belonged to a group of artisans and petty bourgeoisie, who formed a pro-democracy citizens' committee. Other members of this group included the winemaker Johann Philipp Bandel and the doctor Ferdinand von Loehr. On 1 March 1848, this group submitted a petition to their member of parliament in Darmstadt. They subsequently oversaw the implementation of the provisions of the edict of the Grand Duke of Hesse on 6 March 1848.

After the dissolution of this committee, the Wormser Democratic Association was founded on 21 June 1848, with Eberstadt as a member of the board of directors. On 10 April 1848, the military council took control of the Worms civic militia and Eberstadt participated in the drafting of a military law for the city of Worms, which came into force on 15 April. The military council was replaced by a Citizens' Defence Commandery on 26 June, with Eberstadt as its secretary. The Democratic Association managed to influence public opinion through its publications. When the former mayor of Worms, Friedrich Renz, returned in January 1849, it was necessary to hold new mayoral elections.

=== Mayor of Worms (1849-1852) ===
Eberstadt's political engagement led to him becoming the first Jew in Germany to be elected mayor. The electoral campaign was bitter. One pamphlet published the following song, mocking him:

Wollt ihr die Schand der Stadt
wählt nur den Bandel,
und nehmt den Eberstadt
zum Juden Handel,
wollt ihr den Bankerott
zum städtischen Lenker,
so macht die Stadt zum Spott
und wählt den Blenker.

Translation:

If you want the shame of the city,
just elect Bandel,
and get Eberstadt
at the trade of the Jews;
if you want bankruptcy
at the city's tiller,
then make a mockery of the city
and elect Blenker.

In the election on 14 March 1849, the vintner Ludwig Blenker, the winemaker Johann Philipp Bandel, and Eberstadt emerged as the three leading candidates, and Eberstadt was selected for the role by the Hessian national government. He ran for election to the lower chamber of the Landstände (the parliament of the Grand Duchy of Hesse) as representative of Mainz on 30 November 1849, but was defeated by Heinrich von Gagern. On 12 December, the members of the upper chamber were elected and Eberstadt once again ran and was defeated. However, on 2 January 1850, he secured a majority of the votes in a by-election in the Odernheim-Oppenheim district, and he entered the upper chamber of the Landstände on 16 January. However, the chamber was dissolved on 21 January due to its opposition to the Alliance of the Three Kings.

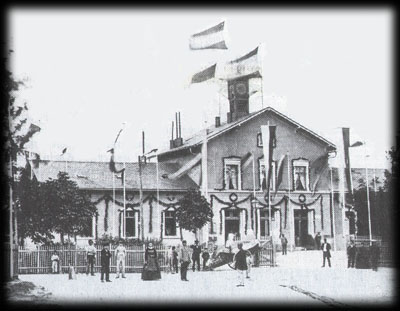
First train station at Worms, built in 1853.

Eberstadt was accused in the Rhineland high treason trial of 8–10 July before the court of assizes in Mainz, as an "intellectual originator" with Bandel and Salomon Lohnstein of coercive blackmail. They were acquitted of this charge on 10 October 1850, but further charges were laid against him for:

- electoral fraud in the Landstände elections of 1849;
- irregularities in his published disclosure of assets to the Ministry of the Interior in May 1849;
- issuing a falsely dated certificate of residence and morality to a young man of Worms.

These charges were also treated as high treason.

From April 1850, Eberstadt was suspended from his role as mayor. After he was cleared of these charges, he was restored to office. As mayor, he advocated the construction of a Darmstadt-Worms railway line and a bridge over the Rhine at Worms. Both of these projects were carried out only after Eberstadt's term of office. In May 1852, Eberstadt was briefly elected to the Worms district council. However, on 25 September 1852, he was removed from the council by a ministerial decree.

=== Move to Mannheim ===
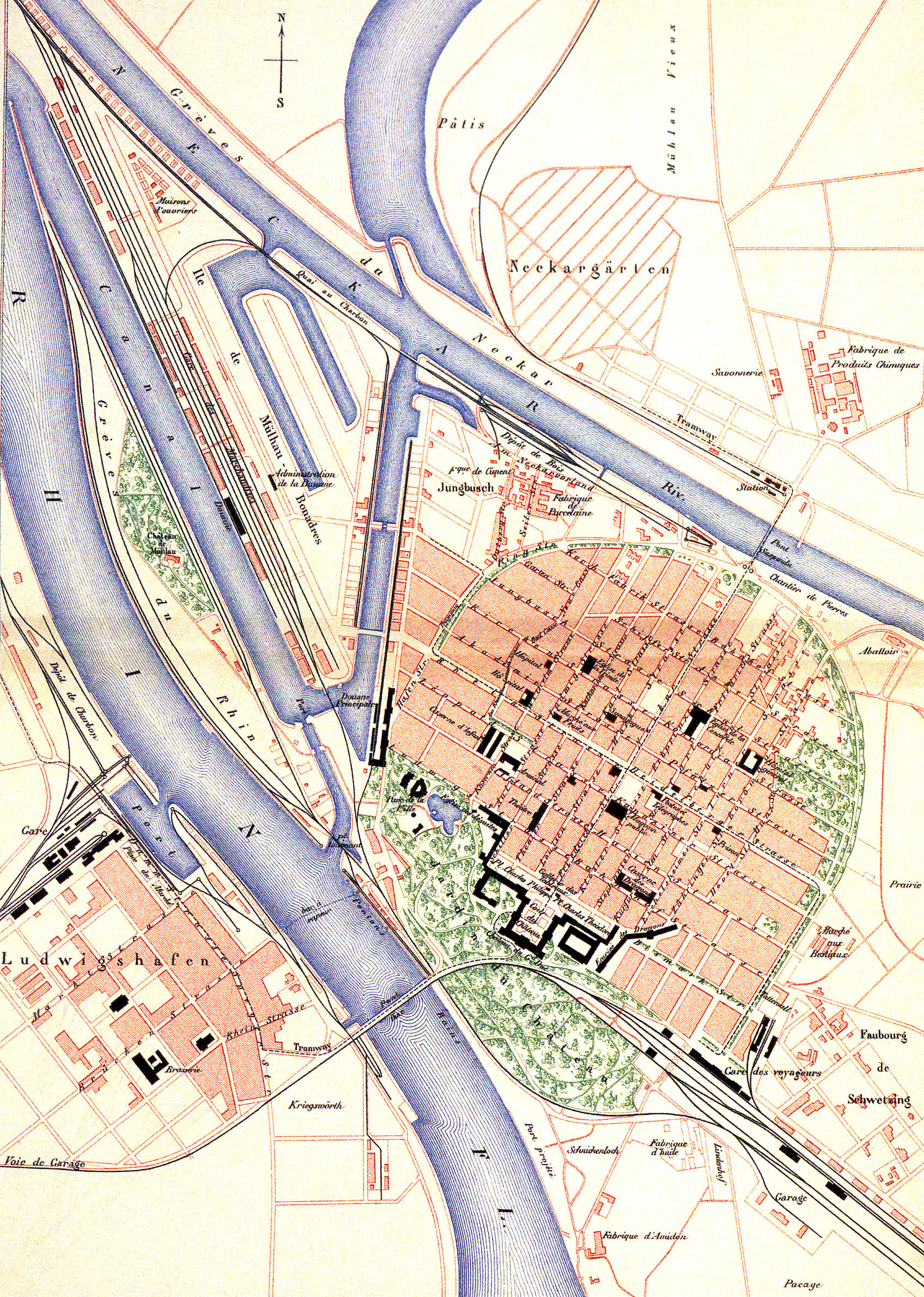
Historical map of Mannheim in 1880

On 28 November 1857, Eberstadt submitted a request for permission to emigrate for himself, his wife, and his ten children, which was granted on 1 December. On 5 December, the family relocated to Mannheim in the Grand Duchy of Baden. There, he established the "Ferd. Eberstadt und Cie." company on 1 May 1858, which was later managed by his son August Eberstadt. This company dealt in "manufactured goods, wool products, wool yarn in bulk." In 1862, Eberstadt dissolved "A. L. Eberstadt", the family firm in Worms. The Mannheim firm became "Ferd Eberstadt und Cie, Nachfahren" in 1897 and continued to trade, with subsidiary offices in Apolda and Chemnitz, until 1933.

In Mannheim, art and music were an important part of the Eberstadts' family life. During the 1880s, the students of Johannes Brahms gathered at the Robert Sohler music store on Paradeplatz, Ecke Kunststraße, under the patronage of the Eberstadt family, Felix Hecht (married to Helene Hecht, cousin of Eberstadt's wife) Emil Hirsch (married to Eberstadt's daughter Bertha), and Bernhard Kahn (married to Eberstadt's daughter Emma Stephanie).

Eberstadt also participated in politics in Mannheim as part of the committee of the German Progress Party. Along with the lawyer Heinrich von Feder and the bookseller Siegmund Bensheimer, he formed a consortium to purchase the Johann Schneider publishing press, including the Neue Badische Landeszeitung, a newspaper whose circulation extended far beyond Mannheim. They established Mannheim Publishing Plc (Mannheimer Verlagsdruckerei Aktiengesellschaft), as a holding company for the publishing house and the newspaper. This corporation survived until 1876, when the newspaper passed into the possession of Bensheimer. It ceased publication on 28 February 1934.

== Family ==
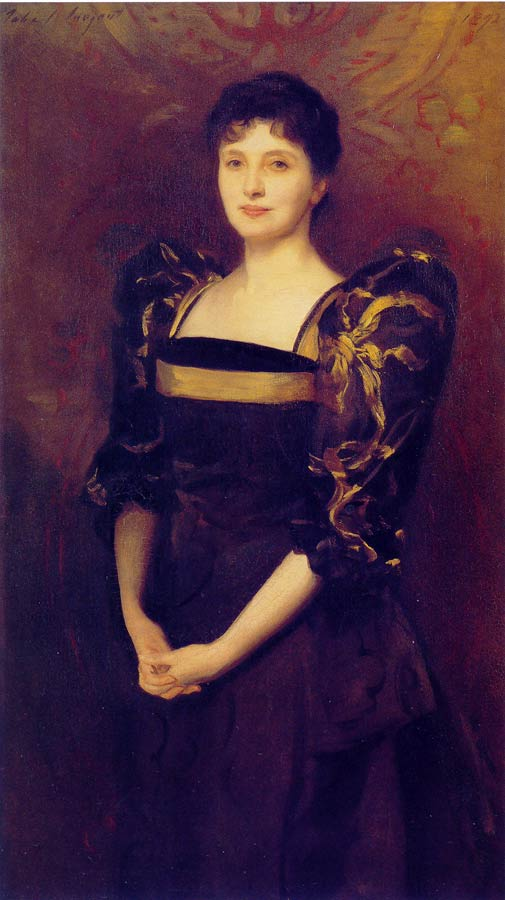
Eberstadt's daughter Elizabeth, who became Lady Lewis, in a painting by John Singer Sargent, 1892

In 1837 Eberstadt married Sara Zelie Seligmann from Kreuznach. They had ten children, including:

- August Eberstadt (ca. 1830–ca. 1907), who took over management of Ferd. Eberstadt und Cie.
- Elizabeth Eberstadt (1844–1931), married the distinguished solicitor Sir George Lewis, 1st Baronet.
- Bertha Hirsch (1850–1913), a noted patron of the arts.
- Rudolph Eberstadt (1856–1922), professor of architecture in Berlin
- Emma Stephanie Eberstadt, who married Bernard Kahn. Their son Otto Hermann Kahn spent most of his adult life in the United States, where he became an investment banker, collector, philanthropist, and patron of the arts.
- Maximilian (Max) Eberstadt, twin brother of Elizabeth, died as a young man and is buried in Willesden Jewish Cemetery, London, in a grave designed by Elizabeth's friend, Edward Burne-Jones.

Ferdinand and Sara Eberstadt are buried in the Jewish cemetery in Mannheim, in the grave 11 on Linker Mauerweg.

== Bibliography ==
- Mannheim in Vergangenheit und Gegenwart. Jubiläumsausgabe der Stadt, Vol. 3: Mannheim seit der Gründung des Reiches 1871–1907. Mannheim 1907.
- Paul Arnsberg, Die Jüdischen Gemeinden in Hessen. Anfang – Untergang – Neubeginn. 2 vols. Societätsverlag, Frankfurt 1971.
- Hans Kühn, "Politischer, wirtschaftlicher und sozialer Wandel in Worms 1798–1866 unter besonderer Berücksichtigung der Veränderungen in der Bestellung, den Funktionen und der Zusammensetzung der Gemeindevertretung." in Der Wormsgau, Vol. 26, Worms 1975.
- "Grab-Nr. 32: Ferdinand Eberstadt und Sara, geb. Seligmann." in Die Friedhöfe in Mannheim. Mannheim 1992, pp. 327–328.
- Dieter Hoffmann, "Zur Emanzipation der rheinhessischen Juden (Ferdinand Eberstadt)." in Sachor, Beiträge zur Jüdischen Geschichte und Gedenkstättenarbeit in Rheinland-Pfalz. 5. Jahrgang, Ausgabe 1/95, Heft 9.
- Jochen Lengemann, MdL Hessen. 1808–1996. Biographischer Index (= Politische und parlamentarische Geschichte des Landes Hessen. Band 14 = Veröffentlichungen der Historischen Kommission für Hessen. Vol. 48, 7). Elwert, Marburg 1996, ISBN 3-7708-1071-6, p. 114.
- Klaus-Dieter Rack and Bernd Vielsmeier, Hessische Abgeordnete 1820–1933. Biografische Nachweise für die Erste und Zweite Kammer der Landstände des Großherzogtums Hessen 1820–1918 und den Landtag des Volksstaats Hessen 1919–1933 (= Politische und parlamentarische Geschichte des Landes Hessen. Vol. 19 = Arbeiten der Hessischen Historischen Kommission. NF Band 29). Hessische Historische Kommission, Darmstadt 2008, ISBN 978-3-88443-052-1, No. 155.
