= Men Without Work (book) =

2016 book by Nicholas Eberstadt

Men Without Work: America's Invisible Crisis
- Cover
- Author: Nicholas Eberstadt
- Language: English
- Genre: Non-fiction
- Published: 2016
- Publisher: Templeton Press
- Publication place: United States
- ISBN: 978-1-59947-469-4
- OCLC: 945948392

Men Without Work: America's Invisible Crisis is a 2016 book by the American political economist Nicholas Eberstadt discussing the phenomenon of American men in their prime leaving the workforce. Statistically, the labor force involvement for men twenty and older fell from 86% to 68% between 1948 and 2015. The book discusses the history, causes, and implications of the phenomenon, as well as possible solutions.

== Reception ==
The book has been reviewed and discussed by several notable news sources, including The New York Review of Books, Time magazine, The Washington Post, the National Review, Vox, and others.
