= Allissa Vasilevich & Otto Eberstadt =

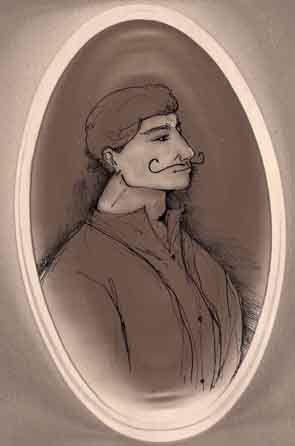
Otto Eberstadt

The Globe and Traveller, Wednesday evening 21 June 1843

Allissa Vasilevich and Otto Eberstadt were performers in the Cooke Circus Troupe from 1839 to 1843, Otto Eberstadt a strongman and Allissa a contortionist. In 1840 the pair were wed and developed their performances together.

Otto and Allissa were amidst a time when the circuses were pushing the boundaries of performance. The London Vauxhall Gardens boasted balloon ascents from 1830 to 1840. These kinds of feats were pressuring those within the circuses and traveling show environments to explore new and exciting ways to bring the audiences back to the round. Side shows provided the audiences with curious fascination or “human oddities” dwarves, giants, bearded ladies, Siamese twins and other unusual acts of which included contortionists and strongmen.

One of Allissa's and Otto's acts was titled "The Russian Doll", a performance in which Otto presented a life scaled, three tiered Russian doll on stage and juggled the set to have finally revealed his wife contorted within the smallest of the dolls.

After the success of this performance the pair were keen to develop their skills further. Amongst the Mander and Mitchenson archives; according to the Globe and Traveller evening newspaper an article was found, stating that in 1843 Otto and Allissa had devised a performance titled "The Tin Canister Extravaganza" in which Allissa would contort into a tin can whilst Otto would continue the performance by sealing the can with a lead solder provided by a Mr. Bryan Donking of the Donking Hall and Gamble Cannery in Bermondsey, South-East London. A terrible accident regarding a sharp implement used to break the lead seal left Allissa stuck within the canister.
