= Stephen Varble =

American performance artist (1946–1984)

Stephen Varble (Marie Debris) (He/Her/Them)
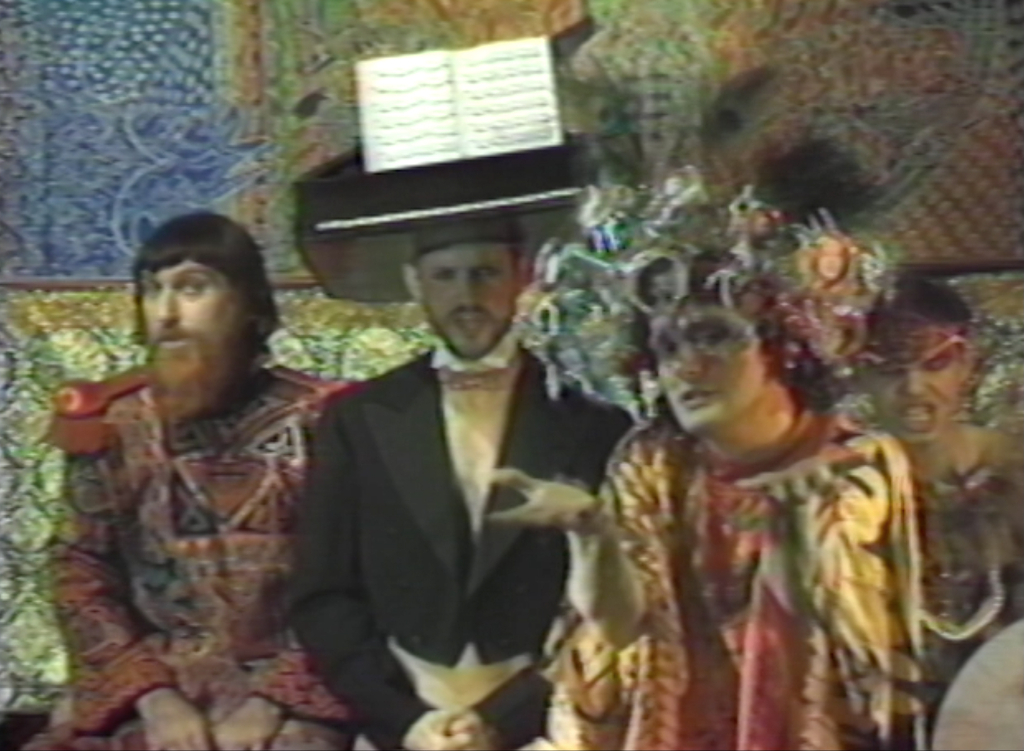
- Stephen Varble, video still from Journey to the Sun, 1978–83
- Born: 1946; Owensboro, Kentucky
- Died: January 6, 1984 (aged 37–38); Lenox Hill Hospital in New York City
- Education: Daviess County High School, University of Kentucky (BA), and Columbia University (MFA)
- Known for: Fashion Designing, Play Writing and Directing, Xerox Art, and Performance Art
- Notable work: Chemical Bank Protest and Costume Tours of New York
- Style: Guerilla-style and Gutter Art
- Spouse: Daniel Cahill
- Partner: Geoffrey Hendricks

Stephen Lloyd Varble (1946 – January 6, 1984) was an American performance artist, playwright, and fashion designer in lower Manhattan during the 1970s. His work challenged both mainstream conceptions of gender and exposed the materialism of the established, institutionalized art world.

== Life ==
Varble was born in Owensboro, Kentucky in 1946. Varble was raised in a deeply religious household by Methodist parents. He is quoted as saying "my parents wanted me to be a missionary but I became a monster instead." He attended Daviess County High School and later went on to continue his education at the University of Kentucky where he received his Bachelor of Arts and was a member of the Phi Beta Kappa honors society. He moved to New York in 1969 to attend Columbia University, where he received a Master of Fine Arts in Film Direction in 1971. While in college, he became deeply involved in the local LGBT community.

In the early 1970s, Varble was a participant in the network of New York Fluxus artists due to his romantic relationship with Geoffrey Hendricks. In collaboration with Hendricks, he created a number of performances including works for Charlotte Moorman's Avant-Garde Festivals, Jacki Apple's "Identity Exchange" (1973), and Alison Knowles's Identical Lunch (1973). The two also performed in Europe in 1972, including Silent Meditation for the International Carnival of Experimental Sound (ICES), Hybrids at the Arts Club in London, and Silent Mediation for the Neue Galerie Aachen.

While Varble publicly identified as a man, some anecdotal evidence and personal writings imply that his conception of his own gender was less rigid. Due to this, some interpret Varble's gender nonconforming art to be public exploration of fluid identity.

He unabashedly opposed many aspects of mainstream capitalism, particularly wealth inequality and the commodification of art. This disapproval fueled many of his most impactful works. In 1977, Varble retreated from the public eye and moved in with his lover Daniel Cahill. During the final seven years of his life, he dedicated himself to filming an unfinished epic titled Journey to the Sun. He died from HIV/AIDS-related complications on January 6, 1984, at Lenox Hill Hospital in New York City at the age of 38.^{,}^{,}

== Marie Debris ==
Stephen often adopted a feminine persona by the name of Marie Debris, a play on the materials used to create his costumes. He did not see this as drag or "gay art", instead he saw it as a way to combat the concept of the gender binary. Marie Debris was Varble's alter ego and a way to break out of the traditional gender binary. Varble, evolved this persona into his alter ego, even though he identifies as a man, he would often dress as a woman in order demonstrate gender non conformity. He often spoke and wrote about having a woman's mind within a man's body. He often struggled with the idea of the gender binary; he found it difficult to only identify within one of two genders. He used his performance art in order to experience a creative form of gender expression, this helped him to explore his gender identity. He claimed that it was easier for him to do this as a public spectacle than it was for him to do it in his own private, personal space.

== Artistic career ==
While in graduate school, Varble completed the book The Elegant Auctioneers for publication by Hill & Wang. The majority of the book was authored by Wesley Towner, with Varble writing the final chapters and editing of the manuscript after Towner's death in 1968. The book is a history of art collecting and art auctioneering in the United States from the late nineteenth-century to the 1950s and 60s. He also assisted the young art historian Douglas Crimp with the lighting of his first exhibition, a show of Agnes Martin's work at the School of Visual Arts in 1971.

In the early 1970s, Varble also worked briefly for Andy Warhol's Interview magazine After receiving a grant from the City University of New York, he directed and produced the vocational film Heavy Duty: A Film Study of the Classroom Paraprofessional (1971). He was active as a playwright in the early 1970s, and his Delicate Champions was put on as part of an experimental series at the Forum at Lincoln Center in 1971. In 1973, Varble directed his play Silent Prayer at La MaMa Experimental Theatre Club in the East Village of Manhattan (14–18, 21–25 March 1973). The production was designed by Geoffrey Hendricks (who also played the silent "God" character in the play), with music by David Walker (an abolitionist and writer who fought for freedom, education, and religion) and lights by Laura Rambaldi. In addition to writing and directing the play, Varble also designed the costumes for the production (with assistance from John Eric Broaddus). Notably, Eric Concklin, a regular at La MaMa and first director of Harvey Fierstein's Torch Song Trilogy, starred in the role of the father.

Stephen Varble's first street performances were tame, compared to his most iconic works. Early outings feature him walking through Manhattan blindfolded, made vulnerable to the world around him. He also created a dress from slides of Hendrick's family, metaphorically claiming his past.

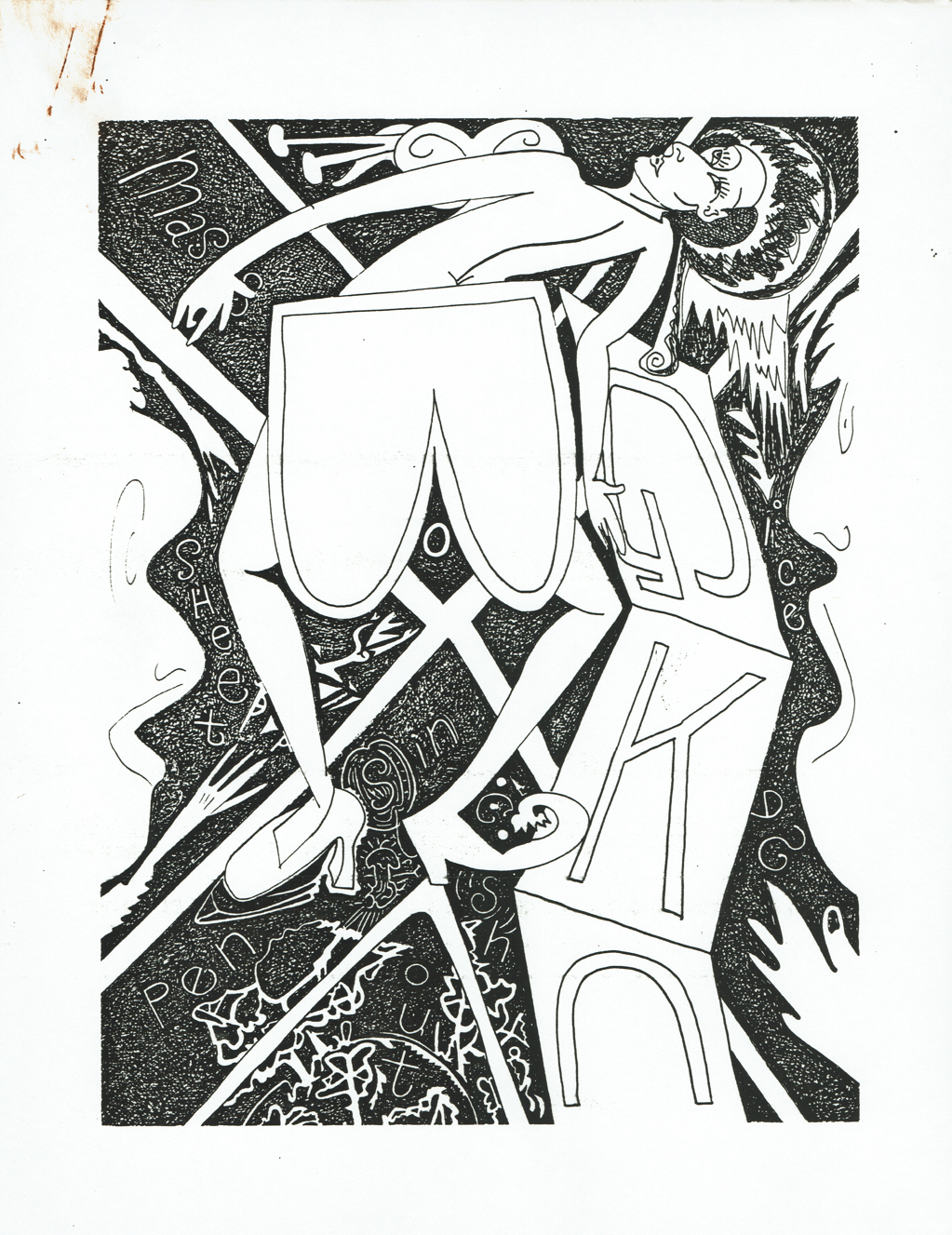
Stephen Varble, Untitled, 1982-83 (after drawings from ca. 1981-83), Xerographic print on paper, 8.5 x 11 inches. Gift of Charles Rue Woods to the Faulkner-Morgan Archive, Lexington.

Varble became most known in the mid-1970s for his public interventions in genderqueer costumes made from street trash, food waste, and found objects; widely referred to as "gutter art." This form had meaning behind the creation, further adding to its value. After breaking up with Hendricks, Varble became increasingly interested in creating confrontational events that disrupted business and that presented him in costumes that complicated assumptions about gender and class, not only within the art world but society at large. The works that brought him to public notoriety were his "Costume Tours of New York", which involved Varble leading onlookers through unauthorized tours of SoHo galleries, boutiques, and museums. He targeted sites of luxury commerce, and his performances attacked issues of class and gender. While his costumes often took the form of dresses, they would also combine traditionally male and female elements together. For example, one of the most iconic images of Varble features him wearing long strands of pearls draped down his hips and legs, contrasted by a pearlescent codpiece ironically fashioned to look like male genitalia. With these elements, Varble draws attention to things the viewer may expect him to hide, asserting his rejection of binary gender roles.

His most notorious such intervention was the Chemical Bank Protest in which he confronted a bank that had allowed a check to be forged against his account. Wearing a costume composed of netting, fake money, breasts made from condoms filled with cow's blood, and a toy fighter plane as a codpiece, he entered a Chemical Bank and demanded that he be reimbursed for the money that was stolen from him. Upon being rebuffed, he punctured the condoms with a fountain pen and used the cow's blood to sign checks for $0,000,00.00, or 'none million dollars'. According to some sources, his outburst was met with applause from visitors to the bank.^{[10]} Shortly thereafter, Varble wrote to the bank offering to become Chemical Bank's PR representative and demanded an outrageous salary. This offer was quickly rejected. The novelist Fernanda Eberstadt was Varble's protégé in these years, and recalled some of his performances in a memoir published in 2018.

In 1975, he produced a series of performances called "Gutter Art", which was performed in front of various high class boutiques. "Gutter Art" consisted of Varble stopping outside in a limousine, which was provided by his dedicated patron Morihiro Miyazaki, dressed in elaborate silk gowns. He would then retrieve dishes and silverware from its trunk, douse them in black ink, then sit in the gutter and wash them. This biting commentary on class inequality was highly controversial, and garnered him both positive and negative attention.

Varble had two exhibitions during his lifetime. First, he staged one for himself in on the eve of his eviction from his loft on Franklin Street, New York, in 1976. For its Gala Ending, he put on a collaborative performance with the assistance of Warhol stars and performance artists, including Mario Montez, Jackie Curtis, Agosto Machado, Taylor Mead, Ruth Truth, and John Eric Broaddus. This performance included, among other things, a giant pink satin skirt which allegedly covered most of the loft. Attendees joined Varble in tearing the skirt to shreds. Second, he had a single commercial gallery exhibition in 1977 when Brooks Jackson Iolas Gallery in New York put on what Varble antagonistically titled The Awful Art Show. When informed that he would be required to include artwork that could be sold, Varble produced chaotic line drawings, complete with anti-capitalist text. Each drawing was priced absurdly high to ensure that no one would even consider purchasing them.

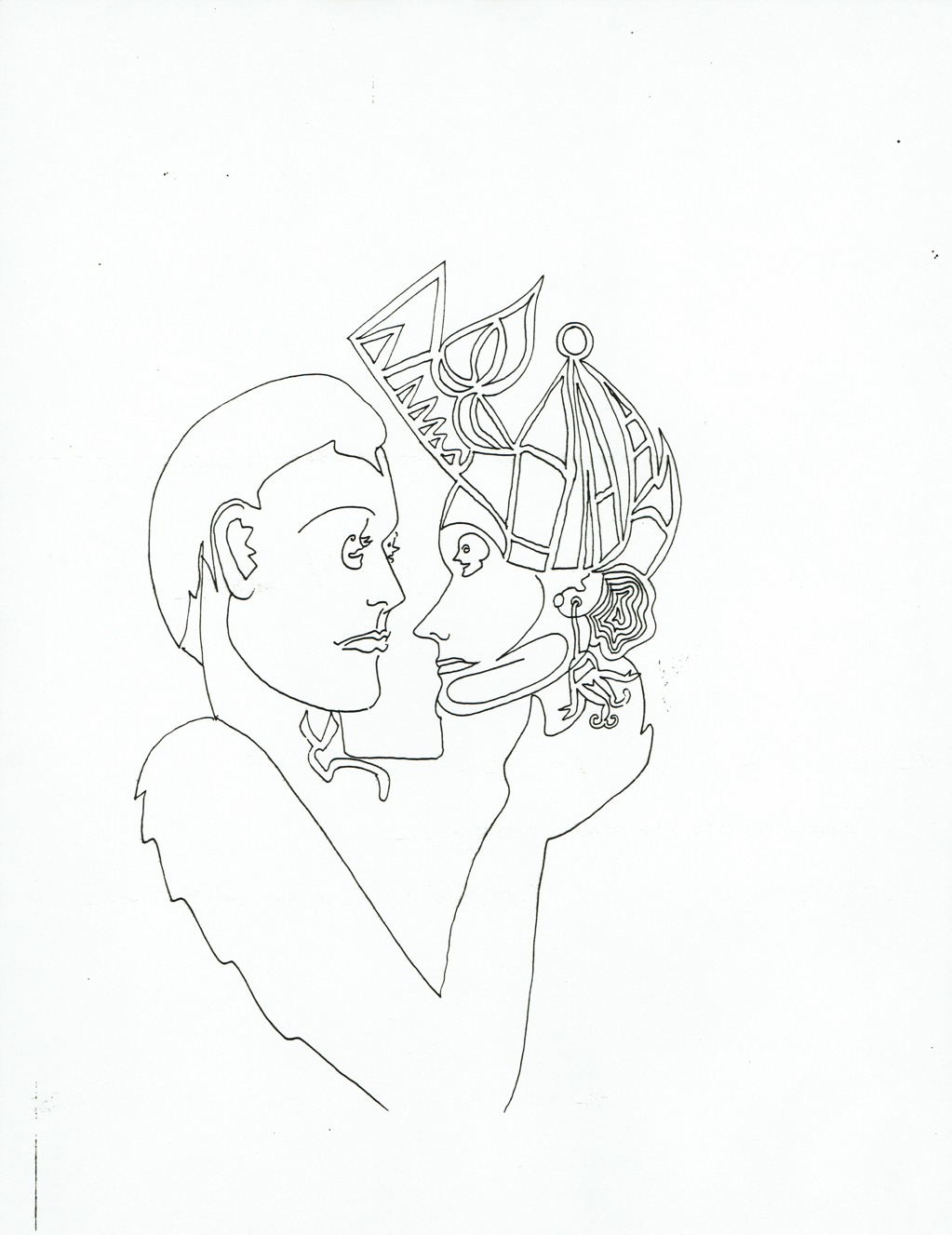
Stephen Varble, Untitled, 1982-83 (after drawings from ca. 1981-83), Xerographic print on paper, 8.5 x 11 inches. Gift of Charles Rue Woods to the Faulkner-Morgan Archive, Lexington.

Varble was also a subject for many famous photographers, including Peter Hujar, Jimmy De Sana, Allan Tannenbaum, Jack Mitchell, Fred McDarrah, Greg Day, Rose Hartman, and Anton Perich.

Greg Day was a cultural anthropologist with an interest in documenting queer culture. Varble was photographed by him often and some of his most iconic photographs came from their collaboration. One of these photographs featured Varble posing wearing a chest piece, headpiece, and sleeves made of egg cartons and a hoop skirt made from tulle. This costume also featured a sign that read "The Ultimate Decoration is Stephen Varble!" This sign turned this costume from art to activism. Another of Day's photographs demonstrate the often impermanent nature of Varble's work. He once wore an outfit composed of green and blue strips of paper and Mary Jane heels. Varble proceeded to tear the outfit apart, captured by Day's camera.

Varble stepped away from performance art around 1977, and instead began working on a video epic titled Journey to the Sun. The video remains unfinished, but hours of footage were filmed, mainly within his and Cahill's apartment. Its music includes compositions by his long-time friend Robert Savage and music Varble composed himself on an early home synthesizer, the Alpha Syntauri. The work is an homage to Greta Garbo, with whom Varble identified. He dubbed himself and his fellow creatives "The Happy Arts School of Manuscript Illumination" because he characterized his work as having a vivid relationship between words and images reminiscent of Medieval manuscripts. The surviving tapes of Varble's Journey to the Sun project are archived and distributed by the Video Data Bank at the School of the Art Institute of Chicago. During his more reclusive period, he also produced several line drawings. Many of them included use of vitamins and enemas, perhaps showing that Varble was aware of his declining health. From these drawings, Varble also produced a series of Xerox works to be distributed freely and cheaply.

In the late 1970s, Varble shifted his focus from performance art to drawing and video; he did this in attempts to make art that could be universally distributed easily and for free. He did this be using a xerox machine (a form of photocopier), by making drawing and reproducing them as xerographic prints. Varble used his drawings to explore the same topics as his performance art, which include issues of sexuality, gender identity, and the human body, though these drawings are a much softer and personal way of discussing these topics. None of his drawing depict gendered figures, instead they are seen as highlighting alternative of the gender binary's construction of a man and woman figure/body type. In these pieces he depicts the human form in a very feminine way with features like, overly defined hips, breasts, and legs while also containing masculine features like, muscular and broad shoulders, strong jaw lines, and facial hair; with the coupling of these features we are not seeing exactly/perfectly a male or female form. During this time he was also working on a video installation, titled Journey to the Sun. He created this in hopes to distribute this as "video books". This video piece, creates a fantasy world that gives insight to how Varble viewed the openness of gender.

Varble frequently used guerrilla tactics to convey his art, accustoming himself to the norms of a 1970s New York. Despite his involvement in Andy Warhol's factory, the memory of his work quickly faded after his AIDS related death in 1984.

== Exhibitions ==
Solo

- 2018–19: Rubbish and Dreams: The Genderqueer Performance Art of Stephen Varble, curated by David J. Getsy for the Leslie-Lohman Museum of Gay and Lesbian Art, New York, 29 September 2018 to 27 January 2019.
- 2019: The Gutter Art of Stephen Varble: Genderqueer Performance Art in the 1970s, photographs by Greg Day, curated by David J. Getsy for the ONE Archives Gallery & Museum, West Hollywood, California, 1 March to 17 May 2019. Traveled to The Horse Hospital, London, 26 October to 16 November 2019.
- 2018: Stephen Varble, An Antidote to Nature's Ruin on this Heavenly Globe: Prints and Video from the Early 1980s, curated by David J. Getsy for Institute 193, Lexington, Kentucky, 20 October to 1 December 2018
- 1977 Stephen Varble: The Awful Art Show, Brooks Jackson Iolas Gallery, New York, 29 March to 16 April 1977.
- 1976 An Exhibition of Costumed Works by Stephen Varble, self-produced exhibition at Varble's loft on Franklin Street, New York, 10 April to 30 April 1976.

Group

- 2019–20 Art After Stonewall, 1969-1989, curated by Jonathan Weinberg, Tyler Cann, and Drew Sawyer. Traveling exhibition organized by the Columbus Museum of Art (multiple venues)
- 2018–19 Pushing the Envelope: Mail Art from the Archives of American Art, curated by Miriam Kienle for the Lawrence A. Fleischman Gallery, Archives of American Art, Smithsonian Institution, 10 August 2018 to 4 January 2019.

== Bibliography ==
- Abel-Hirsch, "The Immersive Approach of Greg Day," British Journal of Photography (17 December 2019)
- Anderson, Alexandra. "The Chemical Bank Encounter and Other Events in the Artlife of Stephen Varble." Village Voice (10 May 1976): 130–31.
- Colucci, Emily. "A New Exhibition Resurrects One of New York's Most Subversive Performance Artists, an interview with David Getsy" them. (posted 3 October 2018)
- Cotter, Holland, "Stephen Varble: The Street Was His Stage, the Dress Was His Weapon," New York Times (11 January 2019): C15, C20.
- Crimp, Douglas. Before Pictures (Brooklyn: Dancing Foxes Press, 2016)
- Eberstadt, Fernanda, Bite Your Friends: Stories of the Body Militant, Europa Editions, pp. 43–59
- Eberstadt, Fernanda. "I Bite My Friends," Granta 144 (August 2018). republished open access under an alternate title at lithub
- Epps, Philomena. "The Trash Couture of Stephen Varble," Frieze (14 November 2019)
- Getsy, David J. "Rubbish and Dreams: The Genderqueer Performance Art of Stephen Varble." The Archive [of the Leslie-Lohman Museum of Gay and Lesbian Art] 62 (Winter 2017): 3-7. Preview article for the * exhibition of the same name.
- Getsy, David J. "Stephen Varble's Xerographic Dreams", in Stephen Varble: An Antidote to Nature's Ruin on this Heavenly Globe, Prints and Video from the Early 1980s, exh. cat. (Lexington, Kentucky: Institute 193, 2018), 3-28.
- Herrera, Hayden. "Manhattan Seven." Art in America 65.4 (July–August 1977): 50–63.
- Kienle, Miriam. "'Rubbish and Dreams' in Kentucky's Queer Archives: A Conversation with David Getsy on Researching Stephen Varble." Under-Main (posted 21 November 2018)
- Maxim, Tyler. "Video by Stephen Varble." Screen Slate (posted 29 October 2018)
- Moss, Hilary. "A '70s Performance Artist Finds a New Audience." New York Times T Magazine, 26 September 2018.
- Nickas, Bob. "Stephen Varble: Now More Than Ever" Affidavit (posted 22 October 2018)
- Werther, Janet. "Discovering Stephen Varble". The MIT Press. Volume 41, no. 3, September, 2019. 17-27.
