= Homeland Security Committee =

Homeland Security Committee can refer to:

- United States House Committee on Homeland Security
- United States Senate Committee on Homeland Security and Governmental Affairs

== See also ==
- Committee on Interior and Insular Affairs (disambiguation)
- Committee on Home Administration (British India) (1918–1919)
- Standing Committee on Home Affairs (Parliament of India)
