= Helene Hecht =

German art collector

Helene Hecht (19 August 1854 in Mainz as Helena Bamberger – 22 or 24 October 1940) was a German Jewish art collector, salonnière and patron of the arts.

== Family ==
Helena Bamberger was the daughter of Rudolf Bamberger (born 4 February 1821 in Mainz; died 7 June 1900) and his Kreuznach-born wife Bertha Bamberger (born 3 December 1827; died 23 September 1915), née Seligmann. She was a niece of the banker and politician Ludwig Bamberger.

Helena Bamberger was from 1875 the wife of the Jewish lawyer, banker and merchant Felix Hecht (born 27 November 1847 in Friedberg; died 18 October 1909 on a trip between Eisenach and Weimar) and the mother of four sons: Hans Paul Jakob Hecht (1876-1946), an English scholar; August Hecht (born 24 May 1878; died 30 December 1879); Rudolf Ludwigg Hecht (born 31 October 1880; died 1959); and Arnold Robert Hecht (born 12 August 1885; died 2 April 1886).

In 1871, her husband was the founding director of Rheinische Hypothekenbank and Pfälzische Hypothekenbank in Ludwigshafen am Rhein on the recommendation of Bluntschli's professor Johann Caspar Bluntschli.

== Life ==
Together with her husband, Felix Hecht, she was involved around 1899 in the founding of the Mannheim Academy of Music, the forerunner of today's State Academy of Music and Performing Arts.

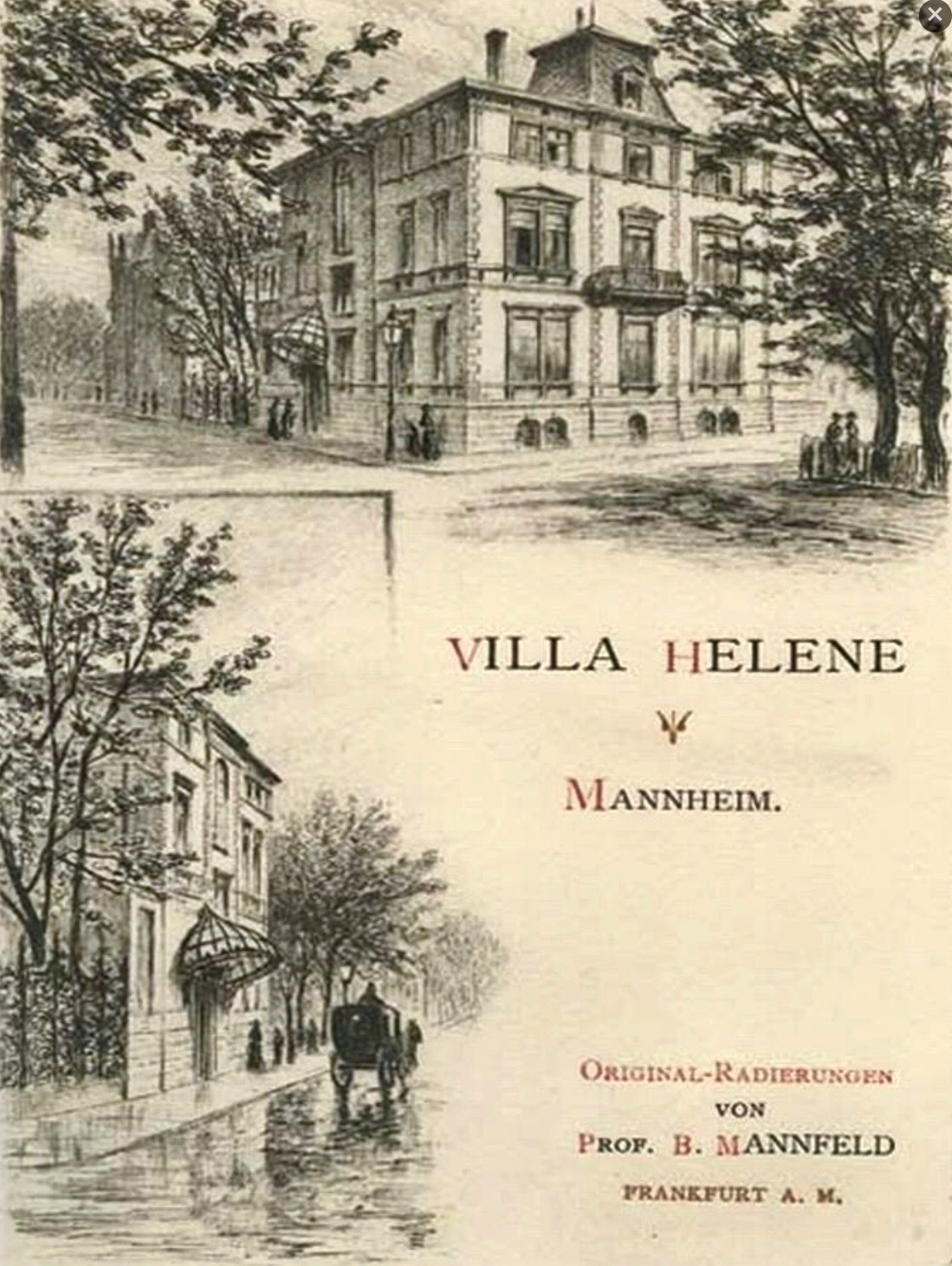
Villa Helene (today: Villa Hecht) in Mannheim, etchings by Bernhard Mannfeld

Helene Hecht, who was educated and culturally engaged led together with Berta Hirsch (1850-1913), founder of the first reading hall in Germany, the largest salon in the city of Mannheim. In this salon, Hecht and Hirsch facilitated communication between artists, patrons and city dignitaries.

The villa was designed by Rudolf Tillessen in Mannheim. Guests included the composer Johannes Brahms, who was a friend of Hecht's husband, and the painter Franz von Lenbach. The latter made paintings for the Hecht family, which were later looted by the Nazis. They were exhibited at the Great German Art Exhibition in Munich, which is now in Mannheim's Reiss-Engelhorn Museum.

The Hecht villa is now known as Villa Helene, a venue for exhibitions, music and lecture events. Today, Villa Hecht is home to a psychiatric day clinic.

== Art collection ==
Helene Hecht had an art collection with valuable paintings. Provenance research which includes the Hecht collection has been undertaken by departments of painting and sculpture at Kunsthalle Mannheim.

== Murder by Nazis ==
Hecht was Jewish and when Hitler came to power in Germany in 1933, subject to Nazi anti-Jewish laws. At the age of 86, Helene Hecht was picked up by the police on the night of 21–22 October 1940, to be deported to the French internment camp of Gurs. She did not reach the destination alive.

Bankruptcy proceedings were imposed on the estate of Helene Hecht on 17 June 1941, and the furnishings of the Villa Hecht were auctioned off.

== Tribute ==
In Mannheim, a street was named after her, the Helene-Hecht-Ring.

== Helene-Hecht-Prize ==
Since 2009, the city of Mannheim has awarded a prize named after it to female artists every two years. The prize is endowed with 3,000 euros.

== Publications ==
- Unsere Reise nach Kleinasien und Griechenland im Frühjahr 1891. Mannheim 1891.

== Literature ==
- Barbara Becker: „In Mannheim habe ich an so viele Hübsche(s) und Schöne(s) zu denken …“ Helene Hecht – Ein Porträt mit Emotionen. In: Ilse Thomas, Sylvia Schraut (Hgg.): ZeitenWandel. Frauengenerationen in der Geschichte Mannheims. 1995, S. 278–291.
- Susanne Schlösser: Helene Hecht. In: Badische Biographien, Neue Folge, Bd. 6. Kommission für Geschichtliche Landeskunde, Stuttgart 2011, S. 177–178.
