= Mary Eberstadt =

American writer

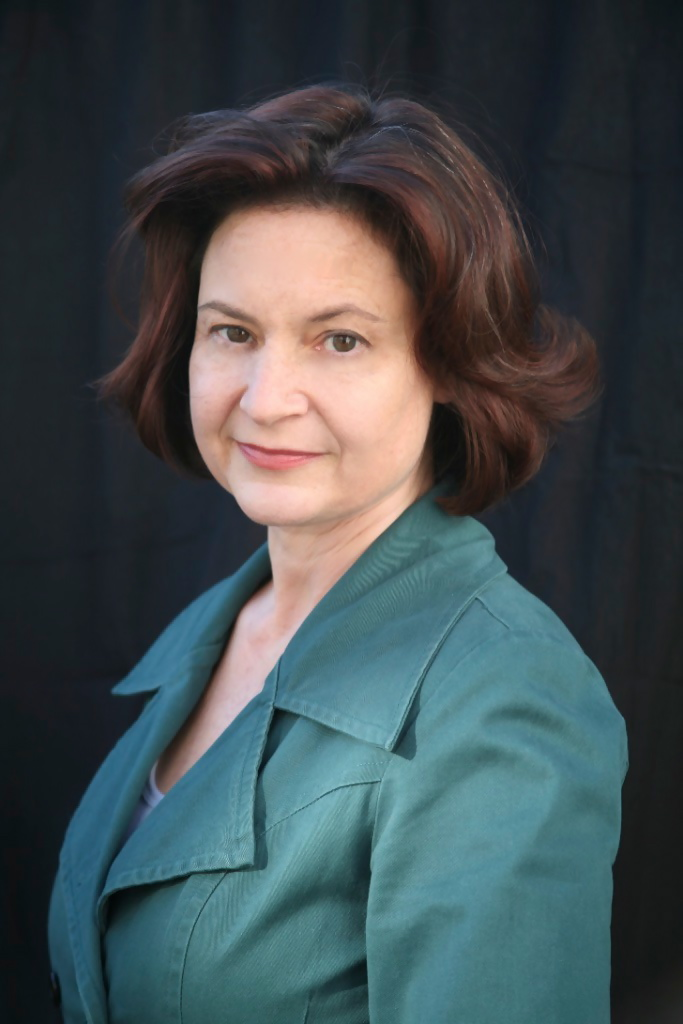
- Eberstadt in March 2007
- Education: Cornell University (BA)
- Occupations: Writer, novelist, public speaker
- Spouse: Nicholas Eberstadt
- Writing career
- Subjects: Religion; Politics; Cultural criticism
- Website: maryeberstadt.com

Mary Eberstadt is an American author, essayist, and cultural critic known for her work on issues related to religion, family, and contemporary social trends. An observant Roman Catholic, she has written extensively about the impact of the sexual revolution of the 1960s, secularization, and the decline of traditional family structures on society. Eberstadt's works often examine the intersections between faith, culture, and policy, and she has been a prominent voice in conservative intellectual circles. Some of her notable books include How the West Really Lost God and Primal Screams, where she explores the consequences of cultural shifts on individual identity and societal well-being.

She has been a Senior Research Fellow at the Faith & Reason institute since 2017 and since 2021 has been the inaugural holder of the Panula Chair in Christian Culture at the Catholic Information Center in Washington, D.C. Eberstadt is a Distinguished Fellow at Australian Catholic University and on the International Board of Course Advisors to Campion College Australia. She is also a former Research Fellow at the Hoover Institution at Stanford University and served as a speechwriter to Secretary of State George Schultz and special assistant to Ambassador Jeane J. Kirkpatrick at the United Nations during the Reagan administration.

Her writing has appeared in publications including The Wall Street Journal, The Washington Post, National Review, First Things, The Weekly Standard, Quillette, TIME, and other venues.

== Education and personal life ==
Eberstadt grew up in rural Upstate New York. Her maternal grandfather was boxing legend Steve Hamas, one-time leading contender for the world heavyweight crown and a famous American football player. She graduated magna cum laude in 1983 from Cornell University with a double major in Philosophy and Government, where she was a four-year Telluride Scholar. She holds honorary doctorates from Seton Hall University (2014) and Magdalen College (2023).

Eberstadt is married to author and demographer Nicholas Eberstadt. They reside in Washington D.C. and have four children.

== Professional career ==
Eberstadt has written for a wide variety of magazines and newspapers. New York Times columnist David Brooks has twice awarded Eberstadt's writing a "Sidney," his annual award for best essay writing of the year. Columnist George Will has called Eberstadt "intimidatingly intelligent," and author George Weigel has called her "our premier analyst of American cultural foibles and follies, with a keen eye for oddities that illuminate just how strange the country's moral culture has become."

Eberstadt served as a senior fellow at Stanford University's Hoover Institution from 2002 to 2013. From 1990 to 1998, Eberstadt was executive editor of National Interest magazine. From 1985 and 1987, she was a member of the Policy Planning Staff at the US State Department and a speechwriter for then Secretary of State George P. Shultz. From 1984 to 1985, she was a special assistant to Ambassador Jeane Kirkpatrick. Eberstadt was also a managing editor of The Public Interest.

Eberstadt is also the founder of the Kirkpatrick Society, named after her late mentor, Jeane Kirkpatrick. Founded in 2011, the Kirkpatrick Society is based in Washington, D.C. and is a professional and literary society for women working in journalism, government, television, radio, book editing, think tanks, and foundations. Over 300 women are members. As of January 2017, the American Enterprise Institute assumed responsibility for the management and operations of the Kirkpatrick Society.

=== Books ===
==== Primal Screams (2019) ====
In 2019, Eberstadt released her book Primal Screams, wherein she argues that fallout from the sexual revolution of the 1960s contributed to identity politics. The book claims that record rates of premarital sex, abortion, fatherless homes, family shrinkage and family breakup sharply reduced family members and associated social trust in the lives of many people born after the 1960s. She connects the numerical decline of the extended family to the numerical decline in role models available to young people, and thus a breakdown of understanding between genders. The simultaneous declines of family and religious life are deemed to be causes driving newly atomized people into substitute communities of identity politics.

==== It's Dangerous to Believe (2016) ====
In 2016, HarperCollins published Eberstadt's book It's Dangerous to Believe: Religious Freedom and Its Enemies, which chronicles what she believes to be a rise in discrimination against religious believers in the United States and elsewhere during an era of ascendant secularism.

In its review of the book, Publishers Weekly both praised the volume and took issue with what its reviewer perceived as limitations: "Casting believers almost entirely as innocent victims without any political or cultural power causes the work to lose some nuance.... For traditional Christians, Eberstadt provides a language to defend their position, a comforting sense that their persecution is real, and a view of the irony of progressives curtailing freedom....[T]he final chapter's call to attend to rhetoric and avoid generalization powerfully makes the case for more civility in the midst of intense disagreement." Writing in the Weekly Standard, Jonathan V. Last called the book "brilliant" and a "tour de force, essential reading for anyone wondering how our civilization can survive the current moment."

==== How the West Really Lost God (2013) ====
Eberstadt is the author of How the West Really Lost God, published in 2013. Michael Novak wrote that the book “strikes far deeper into reality than any rival argument in the field.” The review in The Economist said that the "elegantly written book repeatedly shows that strong families help to keep religious practice alive, and that too many people see a causal connection running exclusively in the opposite direction." Writing in The American Conservative, Rod Dreher called How the West Really Lost God "stunning," adding that "Eberstadt's contribution is to make an argument that not only does religion cause family formation, but family formation causes religion."

==== Adam and Eve After the Pill (2012) ====
Eberstadt authored Adam and Eve After the Pill: Paradoxes of the Sexual Revolution, published in 2012. The book examines how, she stated, the sexual revolution has produced widespread discontent among men and women, and has harmed the weakest members of society. Eberstadt explores the portrayal of post-1960s norms in pop culture voices, pinpointing "a wildly contradictory mix of chatter about how wonderful it is that women are now all liberated for sexual fun--and how mysteriously impossible it has become to find a good, steady, committed boyfriend at the same time." A review in the Washington Times stated that "in this concise, elegantly written book, Eberstadt marries brilliant analytical power with wry wit" and called it "an enormous contribution to understanding both modern moral culture and the significance of current political debate."

==== Home-Alone America (2004) ====
Eberstadt's first book, Home-Alone America: The Hidden Toll of Day Care, Behavioral Drugs and Other Parent Substitutes, argued that separating children from family members at early ages is linked to childhood problems such as obesity and rising rates of mental and behavioral disorders. The book also connected these problems to popular culture, particularly as reflected in adolescent music (including the award-winning chapter, "Eminem is Right"). R. Albert Mohler, president of the Southern Baptist Theological Seminary, called it "a book that should be read by every concerned parent, pastor, and policy maker."

== Other professional and public service activities ==
In addition to her commencement addresses, media appearances, and annual lectures at the Tertio Millennio Seminar in Kraków, Poland, Eberstadt has given widely attended public speeches inside and outside the United States.

Her speaking tour of Australia in 2022 included appearances in Parliament House at Canberra, hosted by the Australian Catholic University; in Sydney at The Sydney Mint, oldest surviving building in Sydney's central business district, co-hosted by the Ramsay Centre and Campion College; and events in Melbourne hosted by Archbishop Peter A. Comensoli and the Archdiocese. The speeches from that tour were collected into a booklet entitled, “Politics, identity and religion,” published by the PM Glynn Institute of Australian Catholic University.

In 2023, Eberstadt spoke in Warsaw, Poland, at the annual Polska Weilki Project conference. She addressed the Edmund Burke Foundation's inaugural National Conservatism Conference in July, 2019, and at the National Conservative Convention in Miami, Florida in 2022. These speeches appeared in print at First Things, and the Wall Street Journal, respectively.

In October 2024, following the attacks by Hamas in Israel on October 7, 2023, Eberstadt gave a keynote at a historic conference at Franciscan University in Ohio, inaugurating the Coalition of Catholics Against Antisemitism, a newly created group sponsored by the Philos Project. Her speech was published at First Things. Our Sunday Visitor, a flagship American Catholic publication for over a century, noted, “Mary Eberstadt’s commitment to combating antisemitism, as demonstrated through her leadership in the Coalition of Catholics Against Antisemitism, encourages us to renew our alliance with Jewish people throughout the world.”

Eberstadt served as a senior fellow at Stanford University's Hoover Institution from 2002 to 2013. From 1990 to 1998, Eberstadt was executive editor of National Interest magazine. From 1985 and 1987, she was a member of the Policy Planning Staff at the US State Department and a speechwriter for then Secretary of State George P. Shultz. From 1984 to 1985, she was a special assistant to Ambassador Jeane Kirkpatrick. Eberstadt was also a managing editor of the Public Interest.

Eberstadt is also the founder of the Kirkpatrick Society, named after one of her late mentors, Jeane Kirkpatrick. Founded in 2011, the Kirkpatrick Society is based in Washington, D.C. and is a professional and literary society for women working in journalism, government, television, radio, book editing, think tanks, and foundations. The Kirkpatrick Society is made up of over 300 women. As of January 2017, the American Enterprise Institute assumed responsibility for the management and operations of the Kirkpatrick Society.

== The Loser Letters ==
Eberstadt published her first work of fiction in 2010, The Loser Letters: A Comic Tale of Life, Death, and Atheism. The book satirically follows the experiences of a young Christian converting to atheism. P. J. O'Rourke wrote that "Mary Eberstadt is the rightful heir and assignée of CS Lewis, and her heroine in The Loser Letters is the legitimate child (or perhaps grandchild) of 'the patient' in The Screwtape Letters."

Playwright and director Jeffrey Fiske adapted the book for the stage, which had its world premiere at The Catholic University of America in September 2016 starring World Champion and Olympic Gymnast Chellsie Memmel. According to Kathryn Jean Lopez of National Review, "The timing of this adaptation by playwright Jeffrey Fiske may just be an opportunity to catch millennial "nones" with an invitation. It's also a nudge to conservatives and others to get creative. Polemics alone won't change the world." Writing also for National Review, Stanley Kurtz noted that this play could serve as a test of free speech on other college campuses. "What if The Loser Letters were to go on a tour that included some secular colleges?," he asked. "I'd like to believe the play would be courteously received at any school, but I can't help feeling that heads might explode—with protests or worse to follow. I only hope we get a chance to find out."

== Recognition ==
In 2014, Eberstadt gave Seton Hall University's commencement address and was awarded an honorary degree. The choice of Eberstadt as the school's commencement speaker brought dissent from some faculty members, who objected that her values were not consistent with those of the university. USA Today listed Eberstadt's address in its compilation of notable 2014 commencement speeches, alongside the speeches of John Kerry, John Legend, and Eric Holder.

In 2022, the Tepeyac Leadership Institute, a non-profit organization dedicated to civic education for lay Catholics, awarded Eberstadt its annual St. Juan Diego Leadership for the World award. In 2021, Eberstadt received the annual Pope Pius XI Award from the Society of Catholic Social Scientists.

In 2014, the Siena Symposium for Women, Family, and Culture at St. Thomas University in Minnesota awarded Eberstadt a Humanitarian Leadership Award. She received a Leadership Award from the Catholic Lawyers' Guild of Nebraska that same year. In 2009, Mount St. Mary's University in Emmitsburg, Maryland awarded its Presidential Medal of Honor to Eberstadt and her husband, Nicholas.

== Reception and Criticism ==
Eberstadt's work has received mixed reviews from scholars and critics. Greg Forster of The Gospel Coalition criticized the methodology in How the West Really Lost God, noting "inaccurate, amateurish history of the 16th century" and insufficient empirical evidence beyond correlation data.

Michael Sean Winters of the National Catholic Reporter described It's Dangerous to Believe as "a lousy book...agitprop" with a "shockingly ignorant" analysis of homosexuality.

Jonathan Kay in Commentary Magazine critiqued Home-Alone America for exhibiting "marked right-wing bias" and described Eberstadt as "an unreliable narrator—seductive but, ultimately, untrustworthy."

=== Campus controversy ===
In 2023, Eberstadt cancelled a scheduled speech at Furman University about "Primal Screams" due to expected student protests. Student newspaper The Paladin published op-eds calling her work "dangerous and evidence-less myths."

== Books ==
- Eberstadt, Mary (2004). Home-Alone America: The Hidden Toll of Day Care, Behavioral Drugs, and Other Parent Substitutes. New York: Sentinel Books. ISBN 978-1595230041.
- Eberstadt, Mary, ed. (2007). Why I Turned Right: Leading Baby Boom Conservatives Chronicle Their Political Journeys. New York: Threshold Editions. ISBN 978-1416528555.
- Eberstadt, Mary (2010). The Loser Letters: A Comic Tale of Life, Death, and Atheism. San Francisco: Ignatius Press. ISBN 978-1586174316.
- Eberstadt, Mary (2012). Adam and Eve After the Pill: Paradoxes of the Sexual Revolution. San Francisco: Ignatius Press. ISBN 978-1586176273.
  - Adam and Eve After the Pill (Revisited ed.). San Francisco: Ignatius Press. 2023. ISBN 978-1621646129.
- Eberstadt, Mary (2013). How the West Really Lost God: A New Theory of Secularization. West Conshohocken: Templeton Press. ISBN 978-1599473796.
- Eberstadt, Mary (2016). It's Dangerous to Believe: Religious Freedom and Its Enemies. New York: HarperOne. ISBN 978-0062454010.
- Eberstadt, Mary (2019). Primal Screams: How the Sexual Revolution Created Identity Politics. West Conshohocken: Templeton Press. ISBN 978-1599474113.
