= Nicholas Eberstadt =

American political economist and demographer

- Born: Nicholas Nash Eberstadt; December 20, 1955 (age 69); New York City, U.S.
- Spouse: Mary Tedeschi (m. 1987)
- Relatives: Ferdinand Eberstadt (paternal grandfather); Ogden Nash (maternal grandfather); Esther Eberstadt Brooke (paternal grand-aunt); Fernanda Eberstadt (sister)

Academic background
- Education: Harvard University (BA, MPA, PhD); London School of Economics (MSc)
- Thesis: Policy and economic performance in divided Korea, 1945–1995 (1995)

Academic work
- School or tradition: Demographics and economics
- Main interests: Russia and former Soviet republics; North and South Korea; Economic development policy; Foreign aid; Global poverty; Global health

Nicholas Nash Eberstadt (born 1955) is an American political economist. He holds the Henry Wendt Chair in Political Economy at the American Enterprise Institute (AEI), a political think tank. He is also a Senior Adviser to the National Bureau of Asian Research (NBR), a member of the visiting committee at the Harvard School of Public Health, and a member of the Global Leadership Council at the World Economic Forum.

== Early life and education ==
Eberstadt was born on December 20, 1955, in New York City. His father, Frederick Eberstadt, was an author and photographer. His mother, Isabel Nash, was a novelist. His paternal grandfather, Ferdinand Eberstadt, was an investment banker and co-founder of the Central Intelligence Agency; his maternal grandfather, Ogden Nash, was a poet. His sister, Fernanda Eberstadt, is a novelist.

Eberstadt graduated from Phillips Exeter Academy in 1972. He then earned his A.B. magna cum laude in economics from Harvard College in 1976, and his M.Sc. in Social Planning for Developing Countries from the London School of Economics in 1978. He completed his M.P.A. at Harvard Kennedy School in 1979, and his Ph.D. in Political Economy and Government at Harvard University in 1995.

== Career ==
Eberstadt was a teaching fellow at Harvard University from 1976 to 1979, instructing courses in population and natural resources, agricultural economics, social science and social policy, and problems of policy making in less developed countries. He was a visiting research fellow at the Rockefeller Foundation from 1979 to 1980, meanwhile serving as an associate of Harvard's Belfer Center for Science and International Affairs. From 1980 to 2002, Eberstadt was a visiting fellow at the Harvard Center for Population and Development Studies. Eberstadt joined his current institution, the American Enterprise Institute, as a visiting fellow in 1985. He assumed the Henry Wendt Chair in Political Economy and became a resident fellow in 1999.

From 1988 to 1990, Eberstadt served as an adviser to the Catholic University Institute on Health and Development. In 1999, he was a visiting fellow at the University of Washington, Seattle. Eberstadt was awarded the Bosch Fellowship in Public Policy in 2008 from the American Academy in Berlin.

Eberstadt has written many books and articles on political and economic issues, including demographics and the political situation of North Korea. He has consulted for governmental and international organizations, the U.S. Census Bureau, U.S. State Department, USAID, and World Bank, and has often been invited to offer expert testimony before Congress.

Eberstadt served on the President's Commission on Bioethics (2006–2009) and the Presidential HELP Commission (2005–2008). From 2003 to present, he has been a member of The Public Interest's Publication Committee, the Overseers‘ Committee to Visit the Harvard School of Public Health, the National Center for Health Statistics Board of Scientific Counselors, and the U.S.–China AIDS Foundation's Advisory Board. He is a founding member of the U.S. Committee for Human Rights in North Korea, and the Commissioner of the Center for Strategic and International Studies (CSIS) Global Aging Initiative.

He was awarded the AEI Irving Kristol Award in 2020.

== Personal life ==
Eberstadt married Mary Tedeschi, now a scholar at the Hoover Institution, in 1987. They have four children: Rick, Kate, Izzi, and Alexandra and reside in Washington, D.C. His daughters, Izzi and Kate, graduates of Barnard College and Columbia University, respectively, founded the music duo Delune.

== Selected works ==
- Eberstadt, Nicholas (1979). Poverty in China. Bloomington, Indiana: International Development Institute. ISBN 9780892490271.
- Eberstadt, Nicholas (1988). The Poverty of Communism. New Brunswick, New Jersey: Transaction Books. ISBN 9780887381881. OCLC 60045171.
- Eberstadt, Nicholas (1988). Foreign Aid and American Purpose. Washington, D.C.: AEI Press. ISBN 9780844736587. OCLC 17951562.
- Banister, Judith; Eberstadt, Nicholas (1992). The Population of North Korea (PDF). Berkeley, California: Center for Korean Studies. ISBN 9781557290304. OCLC 26126272.
- Eberstadt, Nicholas (1995). The Tyranny of Numbers: Mismeasurement and Misrule. Washington, D.C.: AEI Press. ISBN 9780844737638. OCLC 25282807.
- Eberstadt, Nicholas (1999). The End of North Korea. Washington, D.C.: AEI Press. ISBN 9780844740881. OCLC 40668263.
- Eberstadt, Nicholas (2000). Prosperous Paupers & Other Population Problems. Brunswick, New Jersey: Transaction Publishers. ISBN 9781560004233. OCLC 43615787.
- Eberstadt, Nicholas; Ellings, Richard J., eds. (2001). Korea's Future and the Great Powers. Seattle, Washington: National Bureau of Asian Research. ISBN 9780295981291. OCLC 45757810.
- Eberstadt, Nicholas (2004). Health and the Income Inequality Hypothesis: A Doctrine in Search of Data. Washington, D.C.: AEI Press. ISBN 9780844771694. OCLC 53831723.
- Eberstadt, Nicholas (2007). Europe's Coming Demographic Challenge: Unlocking the Value of Health. Washington, D.C.: AEI Press. ISBN 9780844772004. OCLC 173509452.
- Eberstadt, Nicholas (2007). The North Korean Economy: Between Crisis & Catastrophe. New Brunswick, New Jersey: Transaction Publishers. ISBN 9780765803603. OCLC 64771130.
- Eberstadt, Nicholas (2008). Policy and Economic Performance in Divided Korea during the Cold War Era: 1945–91. Washington, D.C.: AEI Press. ISBN 9780844742748. OCLC 631882447.
- Eberstadt, Nicholas (2008). The Poverty of "the Poverty Rate" : Measure and Mismeasure of Want in Modern America. Washington, D.C.: AEI Press. ISBN 9780844742465. OCLC 239235634.
- Eberstadt, Nicholas (2010). Russia's Peacetime Demographic Crisis: Dimensions, Causes, Implications. Seattle, Washington: National Bureau of Asian Research. ISBN 9780981890494. OCLC 867796813.
- Eberstadt, Nicholas (2012). A Nation of Takers: America's Entitlement Epidemic. West Conshohocken, Pennsylvania: Templeton Press. ISBN 9781599474359. OCLC 809613762.
- Eberstadt, Nicholas (2016). Men Without Work: America's Invisible Crisis. West Conshohocken, Pennsylvania: Templeton Press. ISBN 9781599474694. OCLC 945948392.
- Eberstadt, Nicholas (2017). Our Miserable 21st Century. Commentary. 15 February 2017.
- Eberstadt, Nicholas (2021). Can America Cope with Demographic Decline?. Commentary. 18 October 2021.

== See also ==
- Phillip Longman
- Eric Kaufmann
