= Ferdinand Eberstadt (policy advisor) =

American lawyer

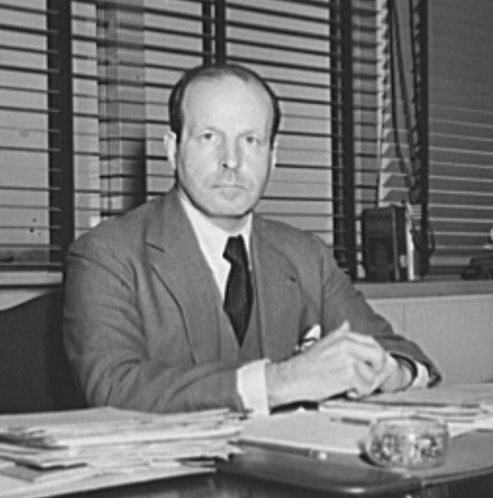
- Eberstadt in 1942.
- Born: June 19, 1890
- Died: November 11, 1969 (aged 79)
- Education: Princeton University
- Occupations: Investment banker, policy advisor
- Relatives: Nicholas Eberstadt (grandson); Fernanda Eberstadt (granddaughter)

Ferdinand A. Eberstadt (June 19, 1890 – November 11, 1969) was an American lawyer, investment banker, and an important policy advisor to the United States government who was instrumental in the creation of the National Security Council and the Central Intelligence Agency.

== Biography ==
Ferdinand Eberstadt graduated from Princeton University in 1913. At Princeton he developed a lifelong friendship with investment banker and future Secretary of Defense James Forrestal. After serving overseas in World War I, he set up a law practice in New York City, providing legal services to members of the Wall Street financial community. In 1923 he joined the prominent investment-banking firm of Dillon, Read & Co. where he earned wide respect for helping with the financing for the firm's 1925 acquisition and ultimate 1928 sale of Dodge Brothers Automobile Company to the Chrysler Corporation. Recognized for his negotiating skills in financial matters, Eberstadt was invited by the Hoover administration to participate in the 1929 World War I reparations conference in Paris as an assistant to Owen D. Young.

As an investment banker, Ferdinand Eberstadt was a key player in the efforts to restore confidence in the business community following the Wall Street crash of 1929 by putting together restructuring packages for small business. In 1931, he set up F. Eberstadt & Co., his own investment firm that dealt in the securities of a medium-sized businesses. Near the end of the decade, Eberstadt created the Chemical Fund that proved instrumental in getting investors to see mutual funds as a sound investment vehicle. As well, he helped pioneer the leveraged buyout technique and his success made him one of the most respected financiers in the United States.

In September 1942, Donald M. Nelson, the former vice-president of Sears Roebuck, and Chairman of the United States War Production Board (WPB) called upon the skills of Ferdinand Eberstadt, appointing him Chairman of the Army and Navy Munitions Board and Vice Chairman of the War Productions Board. Eberstadt developed the organizational structure known as the "Controlled Materials Plan" that allowed the armed forces to prioritize their needs that in turn allowed the private sector to prioritize its production to meet the military's needs.

At the end of the War, on behalf of Secretary of the Navy, James V. Forrestal, Eberstadt wrote what became known as the Eberstadt Report that identified a serious lack of coordination between the Central Intelligence Agency, the Federal Bureau of Investigation, the State Department, and the military intelligence services. His Report led to the creation of the National Security Council. In 1946, Eberstadt served as assistant to Bernard M. Baruch on the United Nations Atomic Energy Commission. In 1948, he prepared a Report on the operations of the National Security Resources Board and the following year was named Chairman of the Commission on National Security Organization for the Hoover Commission.

Eberstadt maintained a residence in New York City but in 1927 purchased an 80-acre (320,000 m^{2}) estate on the peninsula at Lloyd's Neck on the north shore of Long Island called Target Rock Farm. It would become known for the magnificent gardens Eberstadt created. In 1967 he donated this property to the Federal government under the Migratory Bird Conservation Act. Today, it is known as the Target Rock National Wildlife Refuge and is operated by the United States Fish and Wildlife Service. It is open to the public. The donated land was to be the formal legal basis that halted the proposed construction of a nuclear power plant by the Long Island Lighting Company in 1970.

Eberstadt died as a result of cardiac problems at the Walter Reed Army Medical Center in Washington, D.C. in 1969, at age 79.

Among his grandchildren is the writer Fernanda Eberstadt.
