= List of African American suffragists =

This is a list of African American suffragists, suffrage groups and others associated with the cause of women's suffrage in United States.

== Groups ==
- Afro-American Protective Association (Iowa).
- Alpha Suffrage Club (Illinois).
- American Woman Suffrage Association.
- Colored Women's Equal Suffrage Club (Oregon).
- Colored Women's Independent Political League (Ohio).
- Colored Women's Suffrage Club of New York.
- Colored Women's Suffrage Club (Maryland).
- Colored Women's Voting Club in Roanoke (Virginia).
- Des Moines League of Colored Women Voters, formed in 1912 (Iowa).
- El Paso Negro Woman's Civic and Enfranchisement League, started in 1918 (Texas).
- Federated Colored Women's Clubs.
- Iowa Federation of Colored Women's Clubs.
- Los Angeles Forum of Colored Women.
- Lucy Stone Woman Suffrage League (Pennsylvania).
- National Association of Colored Women's Clubs.
- New Jersey State Federation of Colored Women's Clubs (NJSFCWC).
- Philadelphia Suffrage Association, founded in 1866 with interracial membership.
- Progressive Women's Suffrage Club (Baltimore, Maryland), (also known as the Colored Women's Suffrage Club).
- Suffrage Study Club (Wilmington, Delaware).
- Tuskegee Women's Club (Alabama).

== Suffragists ==
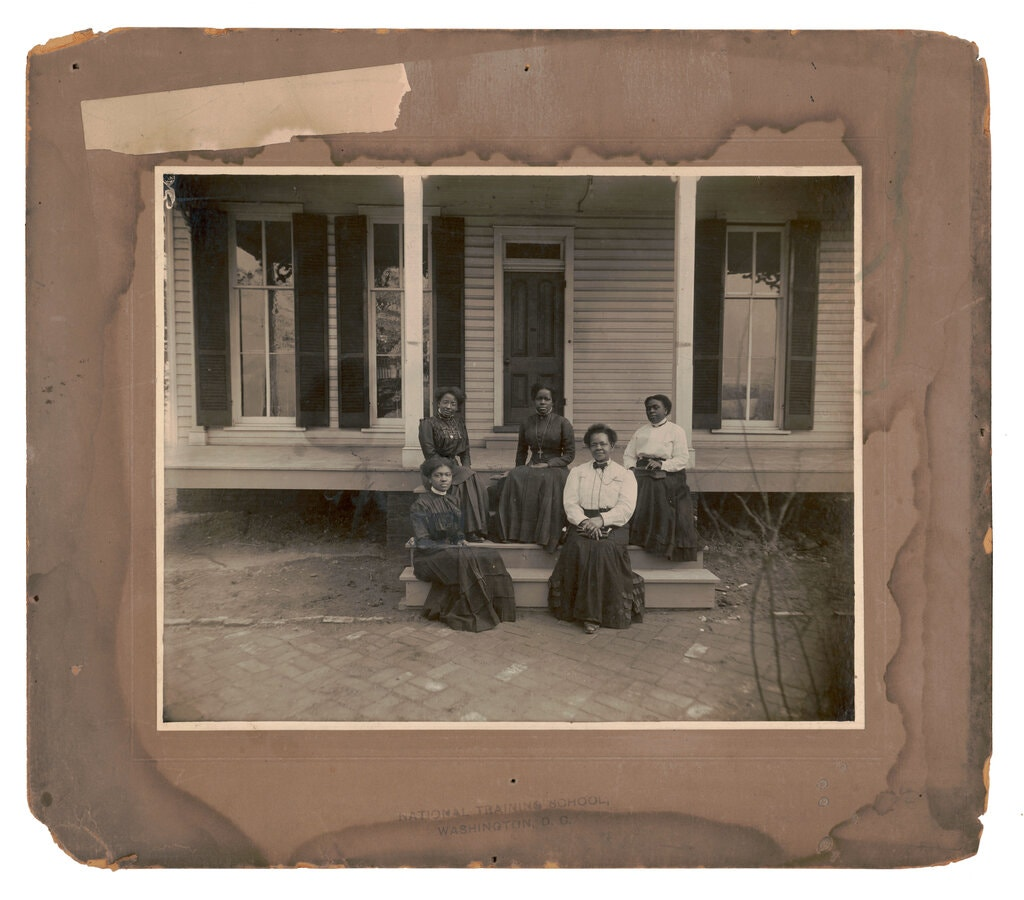
Nannie Helen Burroughs (middle and back row) in 1909.

A

- Christia Adair (Texas).
- Osceola Macarthy Adams.
- Sadie Lewis Adams (Illinois).
- Teresa Adams (Iowa).
- Winona Cargile Alexander.
- Susan E. Allen (Illinois).
- Eliza Anderson.
- Naomi Anderson.
- Libbie C. Anthony (Missouri).
- Blanche Armwood (Florida).

B

- Alice Gertrude Baldwin (Delaware).
- Maria Louise Baldwin (Massachusetts).
- Janie Porter Barrett (Virginia).
- Laura Beasley (Illinois).
- Mary Beatty (Mississippi and Oregon).
- Ida M. Bowman Becks.
- Mae E. Profitt Bentley (Rhode Island).
- Ella G. Berry (Illinois).
- Mary V. Berry (Washington, D.C.).
- Kizziah J. Bills (Illinois).
- Ethel Cuff Black.
- Irene Moorman Blackstone (New York).
- Annie Walker Blackwell (Pennsylvania).
- Bonnie Thomas Bogle (Oregon).
- Bertha C. Boschulte (St. Thomas).
- Rosa Dixon Bowser (Virginia).
- Rose Talliaferro Bradic (Rhode Island).
- Minnie L. Bradley (Connecticut).
- Louise Beatrice Braxton (Maryland).
- Hallie Quinn Brown (Ohio).
- Ida E. Duckett Brown (New Jersey).
- Solomon G. Brown.
- Josephine Beall Willson Bruce.
- Eva Carter Buckner (California).
- Mary E. Cary Burrell (New Jersey).
- Nannie Helen Burroughs.
- Louisa C. Hatton Crawford Butler (Washington, D.C.).
- Marian D. Butler (Washington, D.C.).

C

- Bertha Pitts Campbell.
- Susan E. Cannon Allen (Illinois).
- Jeannette Carter (Washington, D.C.).
- Augusta Theodosia Lewis Chissell (Maryland).
- Helen E. Christian (New York).
- Mary C. Clarke (Illinois).
- Carrie Williams Clifford (Ohio).
- Mattie E. Coleman (Tennessee).
- Maude B. Deering Coleman (Washington, Pennsylvania).
- Coralie Franklin Cook.
- Helen Appo Cook (Washington, D.C.).
- Anna J. Cooper.
- Fannie Wilson Cooper (Iowa).
- Henrietta Green Crawford (New Jersey).
- Ida R. Cummings (Maryland).
- Ella Cunningham (New York).
- Helen M. Curtis (New York).

D

- Ida Clark DePriest (Colorado).
- Addie Whiteman Dickerson (Pennsylvania).
- Mamie Dillard (Kansas).
- Julia Dorsey.
- Frederick Douglass.
- Virginia Hewlett Douglass.

E

- Mary E. Eato (New York).
- Elizabeth Piper Ensley.

F

- Charlotte Vandine Forten.
- Margaretta Forten (Pennsylvania).
- Nellie Griswold Francis (Minnesota).

G

- Sarah J. S. Garnet (New York).
- Ella Gifft (St. Thomas).
- Irene W. Griffin (Louisiana).
- Charlotte Forten Grimké.
- Angelina Weld Grimké.

H

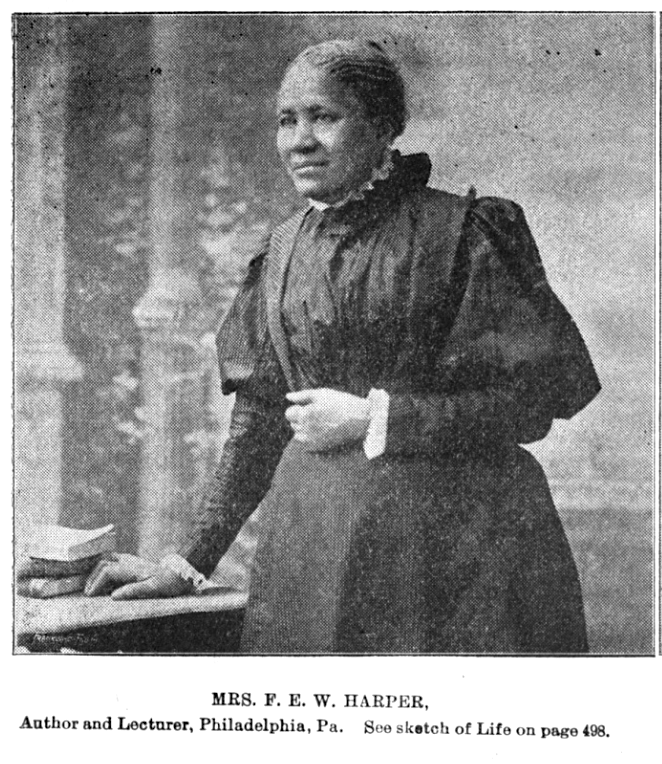
- Frances Ellen Watkins Harper
  Victoria Clay Haley (Missouri).
- Frances Ellen Watkins Harper.
- Lugenia Burns Hope (Georgia).
- Addie Waites Hunton (New York).

J

- Mary E. Jackson (Rhode Island).
- Lottie Wilson Jackson (Michigan}.
- Anna Louise James (Connecticut).
- Hester C. Jeffrey (New York).
- Harriet C. Johnson {Pennsylvania).
- Mary Jane Richardson Jones (Illinois).
- Verina Morton Jones (New York).

L

- Daisy Elizabeth Adams Lampkin (Pennsylvania).
- Lucy Craft Laney (Georgia).
- Indiana Little (Alabama).
- Adella Hunt Logan (Alabama).

M

- Victoria Earle Matthews (New York).
- Mary A. McCurdy (Indiana).
- Rosa Moorman (Ohio).
- Gertrude Bustill Mossell (Pennsylvania).

P

- Millie Lawson Bethell Paxton (Virginia).
- Ora Brown Stokes Perry (Virginia).
- Juno Frankie Pierce (Tennessee).
- Alice Sampson Presto (Washington).
- Lucy Proffitt (Rhode Island).
- Harriet Forten Purvis (Pennsylvania).
- Harriet Purvis Jr. (Pennsylvania).

R

- Harriet Redmond (Oregon).
- Sarah Parker Remond.
- Naomi Sewell Richardson.
- Florida Ruffin Ridley (Massachusetts).
- Ruth Logan Roberts (New York).
- Charlotte Rollin (South Carolina).
- Carrie Barnes Ross (Indiana).
- Josephine St. Pierre Ruffin (Massachusetts).

S

- Maude Sampson (Texas).
- Mary Townsend Seymour (Connecticut).
- Mary Ann Shadd.
- Eliza Pearl Shippen.
- Lydia C. Smith (New York).
- Rosetta Douglass Sprague.

T

- Mary Burnett Talbert (New York).
- Mary Church Terrell.
- Beatrice Sumner Thompson (California).
- Sojourner Truth.
- Harriet Tubman.

W

- Margaret Murray Washington (Alabama).
- Alice L. Thompson Waytes (Massachusetts).
- Ida B. Wells (Illinois).
- Madree Penn White.
- Caroline B. Williams.
- Edith L. Williams (St. Thomas).
- Fannie Barrier Williams.
- Carrie Whalon.

Y

- Estelle Hall Young (Maryland).

== See also ==
- African-American women's suffrage movement
- List of American suffragists
- Timeline of women's suffrage in the United States
- Women's suffrage in the United States
