= Eliza Ann Gardner =

African-American abolitionist, religious leader and women's movement leader

- Born: May 28, 1831; New York City, U.S.
- Died: January 4, 1922 (aged 90); Boston, U.S.
- Known for: Abolitionist; Religious leader; Women's rights advocate

Eliza Ann Gardner (May 28, 1831 – January 4, 1922) was an African-American abolitionist, religious leader and women's movement leader from Boston, Massachusetts. She founded the missionary society of the African Methodist Episcopal Zion Church (AMEZ), was a strong advocate for women's equality within the church, and was a founder of the National Association of Colored Women's Clubs.

== Early life ==
Eliza Ann Gardner was born on May 28, 1831, in New York City to James and Eliza Gardner. As a child she moved with her family to Boston, where her father had a successful career as a ship contractor. Their West End neighborhood was an important center of Boston's African-American community and the abolitionist movement. The school she attended, the only public school for black children in Boston at the time, was taught by abolitionists. Her parents were politically active, and the family home at 20 North Anderson Street was a stop on the Underground Railroad. Due to their involvement with the Railroad, the Gardners met many abolitionists like Harriet Tubman, Sojourner Truth, Charles Sumner, Lewis Hayden, and John Brown. She was also a relative of W. E. B. Du Bois. The Gardners had been involved in the AME Zion Church for years, and by 1843, James was a member of the Boston church's board of trustees, and became second treasurer.

Gardner was a gifted student and won several scholarships, but because academic and professional opportunities for black women were limited, she trained as a dressmaker.

== Career ==
As a young woman, Gardner became active in her church and in the anti-slavery movement while making her living as a dressmaker, and later as keeper of a boarding house. As an activist she knew and worked with many abolitionist leaders including Frederick Douglass, William Lloyd Garrison, and Wendell Phillips. Gardner and her mother became founding contributors of the African Methodist Episcopal Zion church in Boston when it raised funds to move locations in 1865. Gardner continued to raise funds for the church until her death.

Meanwhile, Gardner also taught Sunday school for the AME Zion church, eventually being named Boston's Sunday school superintendent in 1881. She was the first woman named to the position. In 1876 she founded the Zion Missionary Society in New England to raise funds to send missionaries to Africa. Gardner is referred to as the "mother" of the organization, which later came to be known nationally as the Ladies' Home and Foreign Missionary Society.

Gardner's fundraising efforts met with resistance in 1884, when members of the male-dominated AMEZ Church objected to the creation of a women's society. At the church's quadrennial conference, Gardner successfully defended the role of women in the church:

I come from Old Massachusetts, where we have declared that all, not only men, but women, too, are created free and equal....If you commence to talk about the superiority of men, if you persist in telling us that after the fall of man we were put under your feet and that we are intended to be subject to your will, we cannot help you in New England one bit.

She was instrumental in persuading the church to allow women to be ordained as ministers, urging them to "strengthen [women's] efforts and make us a power." In 1895, when female chaplains were a rarity, she served as the chaplain of the First National Conference of the Colored Women of America. She had helped organize the conference along with others like Josephine St. Pierre Ruffin, Maria Baldwin, and Florida Ridley.

Gardner was a founding member of the Woman's Era Club of Boston, the city's first black women's club. She was involved in the formation of the National Association of Colored Women, and was featured as an honored guest at their biennial convention in New York in 1908. Alongside other black Bostonians, she opposed segregated schools, supported fugitives, and advocated for abolition of enslavement. During the 1900s, she often gave speeches against racial discrimination, comparing the current fight for equality with the abolition movement she had been involved in.

In 1909, Gardner founded the Butler Club for the Boston AME Zion church, and was president until her death.

== Death and legacy ==
Gardner died in Boston on January 4, 1922. The Gardner Memorial A.M.E. Zion Church in Springfield, Massachusetts is named in her honor.

== Publications ==
- A Historical Sketch of the A. M. E. Zion Church of Boston, 1918

== See also ==
- List of African-American abolitionists
