= Constance Ridley Heslip =

American educator

- Born: Constance Josephine Ridley; April 5, 1892; Boston, Massachusetts, U.S.
- Died: November 1972 (age 80); Toledo, Ohio, U.S.
- Occupations: Educator, clubwoman
- Mother: Florida Yates Ruffin Ridley
- Relatives: George Lewis Ruffin (grandfather); Josephine St. Pierre Ruffin (grandmother)

Constance Josephine Ridley Heslip (April 5, 1892 – November 1972) was an American educator and clubwoman, active in civil rights organizations in Toledo, Ohio. She taught race relations at the University of Toledo in the 1930s and 1940s.

== Early life and education ==
Ridley was born in Boston, the daughter of Ulysses Archibald Ridley Jr. and Florida Yates Ruffin Ridley. Her mother was a noted journalist, educator, and clubwoman, and her father was a tailor. Her maternal grandparents were judge George Lewis Ruffin and Josephine St. Pierre Ruffin, founder of the National Association of Colored Women's Clubs. She attended Simmons College.

== Career ==
Heslip was head resident worker at the Robert Gould Shaw House, a settlement house in Lower Roxbury, Massachusetts. She taught race relations as a sociology course at the University of Toledo for sixteen years, beginning in 1931. She corresponded with W. E. B. Du Bois. She co-founded the Toledo chapter of Delta Sigma Theta, and served on the national executive board of the YWCA. She served on a governor's commission on employment in Ohio, on the committee on race relations of the Toledo Council of Churches, and on the board of the Toledo Consumers League. She was treasurer of the Toledo branch of the NAACP. She was a member of the Toledo Council on the Cause and Cure of War. Heslip spoke on race relations, war, and employment, to audiences in Ohio, Michigan, Missouri, and Virginia in the 1930s and 1940s.

== Publications ==
- "The Study of the Negro in College and University Curricula" (1943)

== Personal life ==
Ridley married attorney and World War I veteran Jesse S. Heslip in 1927. Her mother lived with her until the older woman's death in 1943; Heslip gave her mother's papers to a cousin, historian Maude T. Jenkins, in 1969. Her husband died in 1971, and she died in 1972, at the age of 80. The Heslip-Ruffin Family Papers are in the collection of the Amistad Research Center at Tulane University.
