= Alice A. Casneau =

American dressmaker and clubwoman (died 1953)

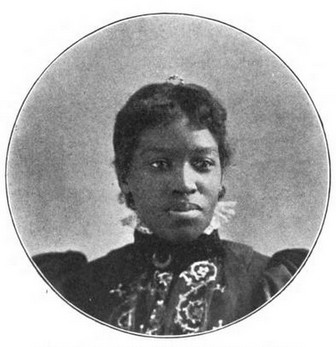
- Born: December 1866; Virginia
- Died: 24 March 1953 (aged 86); Roxbury, Massachusetts
- Occupations: Dressmaker, Activist, Author
- Known for: Clubwoman and leader
- Spouse: Elmer E. Casneau
- Children: Pearl E. Casneau

Alice A. Tolliver Casneau (died 1953), known professionally as Mrs. A. A. Casneau, was an American dressmaker and clubwoman based in the Boston, Massachusetts area.

== Career ==
Casneau was a dressmaker in the Boston area with a recorded land purchase in Everett, Massachusetts. She was also active in the National Association of Colored Women's Clubs when it held its first national conference in Boston in 1895.

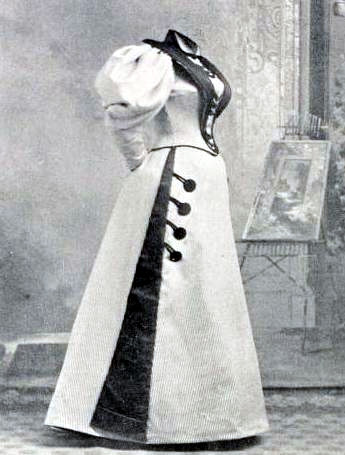
One of Casneau's_dresses from her guide

In the same year as the Boston conference she gave a paper on "Morals and Manners" at the meeting of the Woman's Era Club. As a successful businessperson, she gave a presentation on "Dressmaking" at the first meeting of the National Negro Business League, held in Boston in 1900. "If there is no market for your wares in the community in which you live," she told the audience, "find a place that needs you, that needs just the talent that God has given you, and when you have found it, fill it." She was an associate member of the Massachusetts Branch of the Niagara Movement in 1907.

Casneau's "Guide for Artistic Dress Cutting and Making" (1895) was a "remarkable" 73-page booklet. It was one of the ten titles by black women authors available in the reception room of the National Conference of Colored Women in 1895. Casneau also sat on an organising committee for the conference.

Her work was also featured on the literature table at the New England Hospital for Women and Children.

During World War I, she served on the executive committee of the Soldiers' Comfort Unit in Boston, a women's group that provided supports for black soldiers stationed in or near Boston. In 1925, she was elected president of the League of Women for Community Service.

== Personal life ==
Alice Tolliver married Elmer E. Casneau, a barber, in 1887. They had a daughter, Pearl E. Casneau, born in 1892. Alice A. Casneau died in 1953 in Massachusetts.
