= Josephine Silone Yates =

American chemist (1852/59–1912)

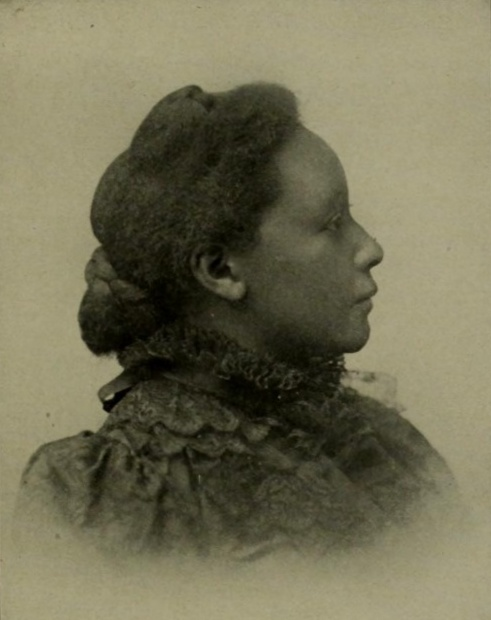
- Born: 1852 or November 15, 1859; Mattituck, New York, U.S.
- Died: September 3, 1912; Kansas City, Missouri, U.S.
- Education: Rhode Island State Normal School, later named Rhode Island College, Rhode Island
- Known for: First Black woman to head a college science department and the first Black woman to hold a full professorship at any U.S. college or university
- Children: 2
- Scientific career
- Fields: Chemistry, education
- Workplaces: Lincoln University in Jefferson City, Missouri

Josephine Silone Yates
- Occupations: Magazine correspondent; active member of the African American women's club movement; writer
- Writing career
- Pen name: Mrs. R. K. Potter
- Period: 1880s–1906
- Subjects: Racial uplift, poetry, women's issues, black history

Josephine Silone Yates (1852 or November 15, 1859 – September 3, 1912) was an American professor, writer, public speaker, and activist. She trained in chemistry and became one of the first black professors hired at Lincoln University in Jefferson City, Missouri. Upon her promotion, she became the first black woman to head a college science department. She may have been the first black woman to hold a full professorship at any U.S. college or university.

Yates also made significant contributions to journalism (sometimes under the pseudonym Mrs. R. K. Potter) and the overall social mobility of black women. She was a correspondent for the Woman's Era (the first monthly magazine published by black women in the United States). She wrote for other newspapers and magazines as well, including Omaha, Nebraska's Enterprise.

Yates was a major figure in the African-American women's club movement and was instrumental in establishing women's clubs for African-American women. She helped found and was the first president of the Kansas City Colored Women's League (1893), and was the second president of the National Association of Colored Women (1900–04).

== Early life and education ==
Josephine Silone's birth is given variously as 1852 and November 15, 1859. She was the second daughter of Alexander and Parthenia Reeve Silone in Mattituck, New York. During her childhood, Silone and her family lived with her maternal grandfather, Lymas Reeves, who had been freed from slavery in 1813.

Silone started school at age six, and was rapidly advanced by her teachers. At age nine, she reportedly studied physiology and physics and possessed advanced mathematical ability. At age nine, Silone submitted "a story for publication to a New York weekly magazine. Though the article was rejected for publication, she received a letter of encouragement, which increased her ambition to succeed."

Silone's uncle, Reverend John Bunyan Reeve, was the pastor of the Lombard Street Central Church in Philadelphia. At age 11, she went to live with him so that she could attend the Institute for Colored Youth. There she was mentored by its director, Fanny Jackson Coppin. The next year, Rev. Reeve moved to Howard University, and as a result, Silone went to live in Newport, Rhode Island with her maternal aunt, Francis I. Girard. There, she attended grammar school and later Rogers High School. Yates was the only black student at both, but was well received by her teachers due to her academic prowess. Her science teacher considered her his brightest pupil and enabled her to do additional laboratory work in chemistry. As the first black student to graduate from Rogers High School, Silone graduated as valedictorian of the class of 1877 and received a medal for scholarship.

Silone chose to attend the Rhode Island State Normal School in Providence to become a teacher, rather than pursue a university career. She graduated with honors in 1879, the only black student in her class. She was the first African American certified to teach in the schools of Rhode Island. When she took the teacher's exam, earned the highest score ever given in Providence. She later earned a master's degree from the National University of Illinois.

== Teaching ==
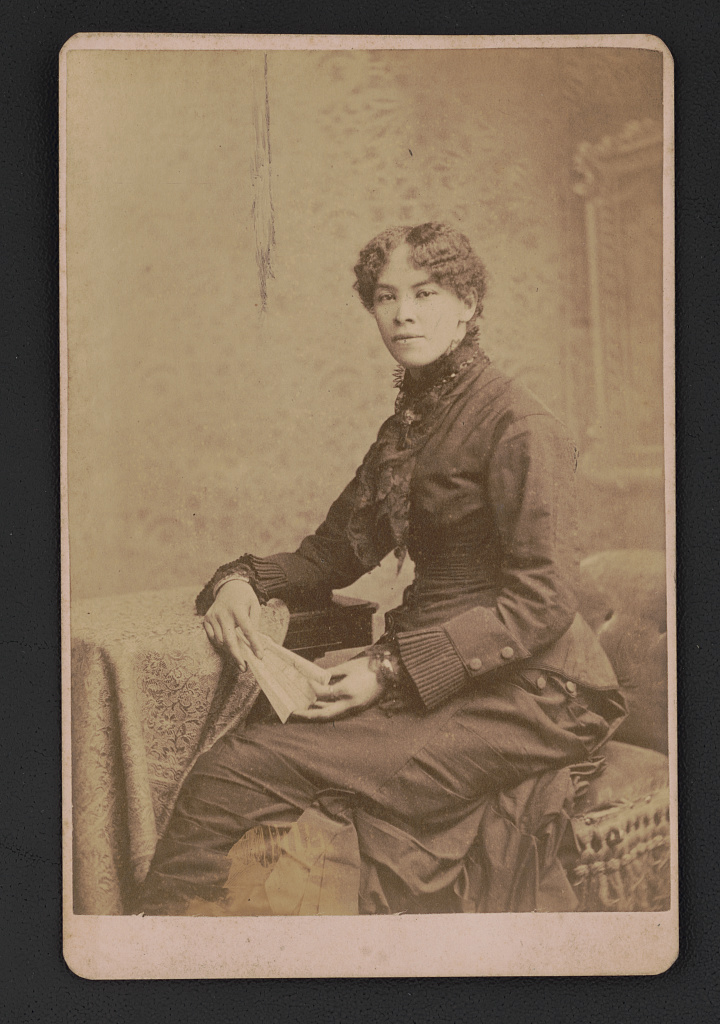
Josephine A. Silone Yates, ca 1885

In 1879, Silone moved to Jefferson City, Missouri, to work as one of the first black teachers at Lincoln University. President Inman Edward Page considered it essential to replace the previously white faculty with black teachers, as role models for the school's African-American students. The teachers lived on campus in the dormitories with the students. Silone taught chemistry, elocution, and English literature. Upon her promotion to head of the natural science department, she became the first black woman to head a college science department and the first black woman to hold a full professorship at any U.S. college or university. She eventually earned $1000 a year in these roles.

In 1886, she was offered the position of "lady-principal" at Tuskegee Institute in Alabama led by Booker T. Washington. She declined.

Silone was clear about her purpose in teaching. In a 1904 essay, she wrote: "The aim of all true education is to give to body and soul all the beauty, strength, and perfection of which they are capable, to fit the individual for complete living."

== Marriage and family ==
In 1889, Silone married William Ward Yates. Many schools prohibited married women from teaching, and upon her marriage, she gave up her teaching position at Lincoln. She moved to Kansas City, Missouri, where her husband was the principal of Phillips School.

Her daughter Josephine Silone Yates, Jr. was born in 1890. Her son William Blyden Yates was born in 1895.

== Writing as Mrs. R.K. Potter ==
In Kansas City, Yates became active in the African-American women's club movement. She was a correspondent for The Woman's Era (the first monthly magazine published by black women in the United States), and also wrote for the Southern Workman, The Voice of the Negro, the Indianapolis Freeman, and the Kansas City Rising Son, under her own name and the pseudonym "R. K. Porter".

Racial uplift was one of many topics she spoke and wrote about. Her paper addressed the question "Did the American Negro make, in the nineteenth century, achievements along the lines of wealth, morality, education, etc., commensurate with his opportunities? If so, what achievements did he make?" She published poetry, including "The Isles of Peace," "The Zephyr," and "Royal To-Day."

Yates was also interested in a wide range of literature, including untranslated French and German works. She published on German and Russian literature, and noted the similarities between the Russian system of serfdoms and slavery in America.

She was included as one of 100 of "America's greatest Negroes" in Twentieth Century Negro Literature; or, A Cyclopedia of Thought on the Vital Topics Relating to the American Negro in 1902.

== The Women's Club movement ==
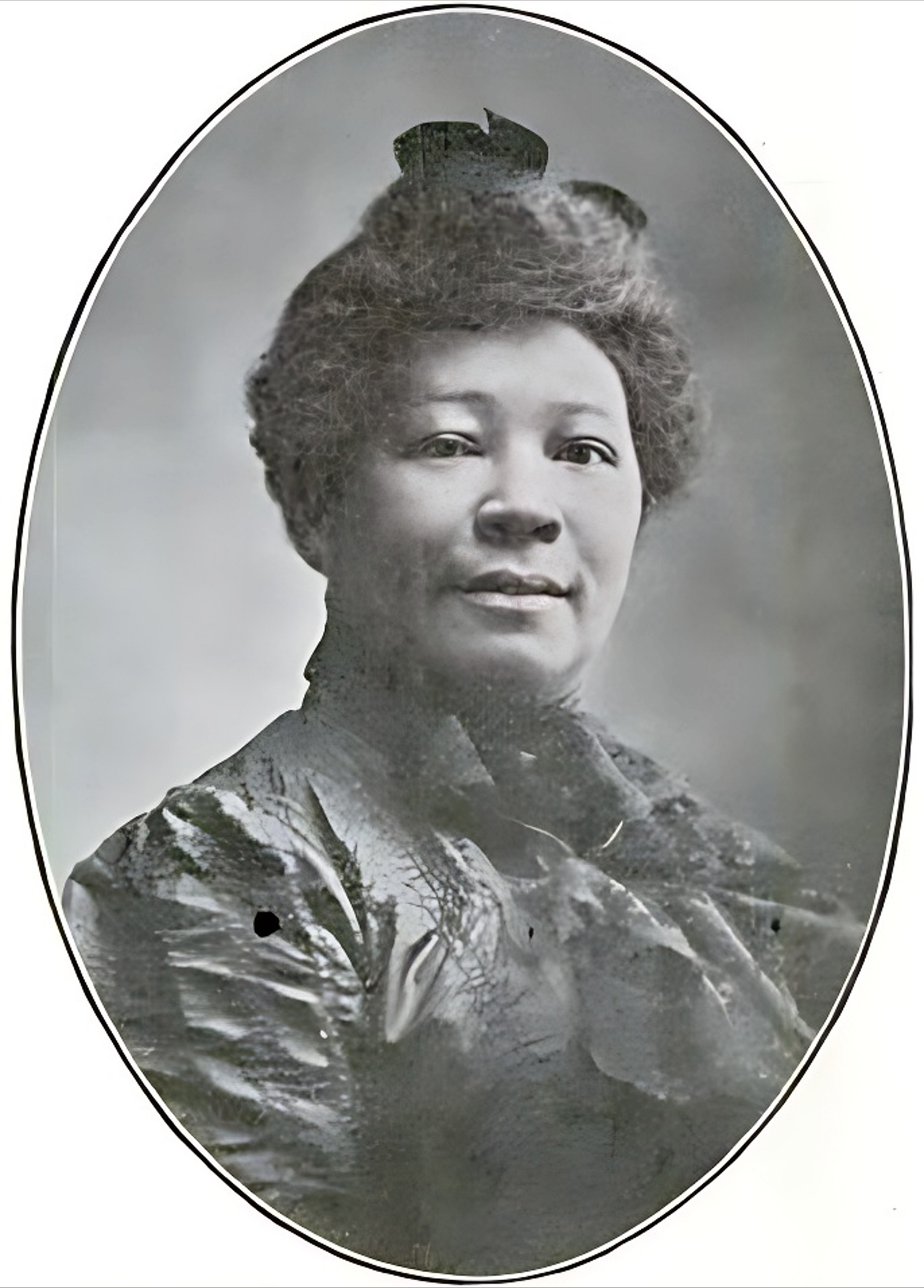
Josephine Silone Yates, c. 1900

Yates helped to found the Women's League of Kansas City, an organization for the self-help and social betterment for African-American women, and became its first president in 1893. In 1896, the Women's League joined the National Association of Colored Women (NACW), a federation of similar clubs from around the country. Yates served with the NACW for four years as the treasurer or vice-president (1897 to 1901) and for four years as the second president (1901 to 1904), succeeding Mary Church Terrell. She was the NACW's second president. By 1911, she had helped found the first black Young Women's Christian Association in Kansas City.

Anna Julia Cooper provided a testament to her accomplishments and acclaim in a speech presented by in 1893 at the World's Congress of Representative Women in Chicago:

In organized efforts for self help and benevolence also our women been active. The Colored Women's League, of which I am at present corresponding secretary, has active, energetic branches in the South and West. The branch in Kansas City, with a membership of upward of one hundred and fifty, already has begun under their vigorous president, Mrs. Yates, the erection of a building for friendless girls.

== Later life ==
In 1902, Yates was recalled by the president of Lincoln Institute to serve as the head of the department of English and history. In 1908 she requested to resign due to illness, but the board of regents did not accept, and she stayed on as the advisor to women at Lincoln Institute.

Her husband died in 1910, after which she chose to return to Kansas City. She taught at Lincoln High School from then until her death.

Yates died on September 3, 1912, after a short illness.

== See also ==
- Timeline of women in science
