= Agnes Jones Adams =

African American activist and teacher (1858–1923)

- Born: 1858; Baltimore, Maryland
- Died: April 1923 (aged 64–65)
- Occupation: Social Reformer

Agnes Jones Adams (1858 – April 1923) was a member of National Association of Colored Women, Social Purity Movement, and Woman's Era Club. Adams was one of the early pioneers for the advancement of black women's clubs.

== Biography ==
Agnes Jones Adams was born in a well-known and respected family in Baltimore, Maryland. She received her basic education in the public schools. Adams was a devoted church worker of the Methodist Church and took on the job of day school teacher. After her marriage she moved to Boston, Massachusetts.

In Boston, Adams joined the Woman's Era Club, the National Association for the Advancement of Colored People, and other organizations. Adams presided over the meeting to organize the National Federation of Colored Women's Clubs. She was the Boston branch leader of the NAACP.

Adams was part of the executive board of the Woman's Era Club.

She was present during the First National Conference of the Colored Women of America at Berkeley Hall, Boston, Massachusetts on July 29–31, 1895. Where she discussed social purity and nationalism on Wednesday, July 31. Her speech, entitled "Social Purity," was important in that it asserted that being white was not a "criterion for being American." Hallie Q. Brown, a witness to the speech, stated that Adams treated the subject of black women's patriotism with "reserve and care, yet with firmness and clarity."

To this woman belongs the honor of, at a most critical time, the time when she and women of the same descent, were publicly and brutally attacked, of voicing an unanswerable appeal to justice, culture and civilization. And her heroism in "standing on the beaches" without stopping to count the cost in her endeavor to right a flagrant wrong entitles her to the highest praise for fidelity and fearlessness.
