= First National Conference of the Colored Women of America =

1895 conference in Boston, Massachusetts, US

The First National Conference of the Colored Women of America was a three-day conference in Boston organized by Josephine St. Pierre Ruffin, a civil rights leader and suffragist. In August 1895, representatives from 42 African-American women's clubs from 14 states convened at Berkeley Hall for the purpose of creating a national organization. It was the first event of its kind in the United States.

Speakers included Margaret Murray Washington (the wife of Booker T. Washington), author and former slave Victoria Earle Matthews, anti-lynching activist Ida B. Wells, scholar Anna J. Cooper, civil rights leader T. Thomas Fortune, and social reformers Henry B. Blackwell and William Lloyd Garrison. The National Federation of Afro-American Women, which became the National Association of Colored Women the following year, was organized during the conference.

== History ==
=== Background ===
In 1892, Boston activist Josephine St. Pierre Ruffin founded the Woman's Era Club, an advocacy group for black women, with the help of her daughter, Florida Ruffin Ridley, and educator Maria Louise Baldwin. It was the first black women's club in Boston, and one of the first in the country. Its members, prominent black women from the Boston area, devoted their efforts to education, women's suffrage, and race-related issues such as anti-lynching reform. Its slogan was "Help to make the world better". The Woman's Era, an illustrated monthly publication, was the club's newspaper.

In the early 1890s, when the Woman's Era polled readers to see if there was a need for a national organization of black clubwomen, the response was overwhelmingly positive. In 1895, an obscure Missouri journalist named John Jacks sent a letter to the secretary of the British Anti-Slavery Society, Florence Belgarnie. In the letter, Jacks criticized the anti-lynching work of Ida B. Wells, and wrote that black women had "no sense of virtue" and were "altogether without character". Outraged, Belgarnie sent the letter to Ruffin who distributed the letter to various women's clubs in her call to organize. Soon after, Ruffin organized a national conference in Boston, and asked clubs to send delegates. The first day was to be devoted to the business of organizing, and the second and third to "vital questions concerning our moral, mental, physical and financial growth and well-being." In the call, Ruffin explained the choice of venue:

Boston has been selected as a meeting place because it has seemed to be the general opinion that here, and here only, can be found the atmosphere which would best interpret and represent us, our position, our needs, and our aims.

=== Conference ===
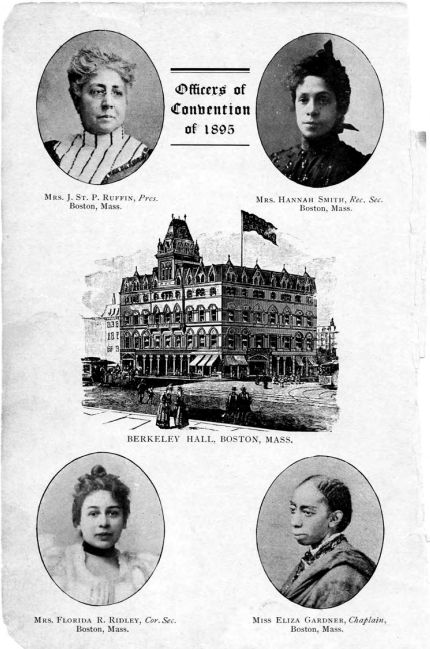
Officers of Convention of 1895. Historical Records of Conventions of 1895–96 of the Colored Women of America

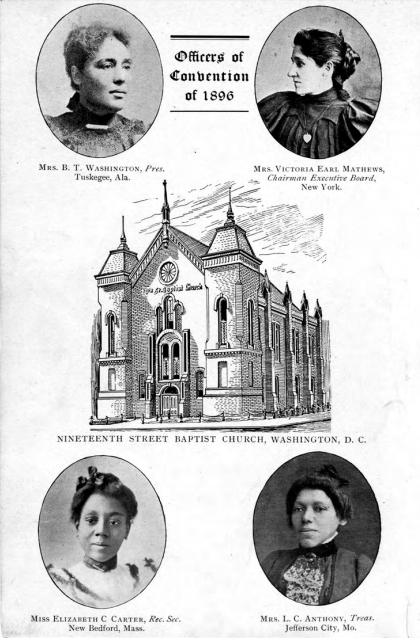
Officers of Convention of 1896. Historical Records of Conventions of 1895–96 of the Colored Women of America

On July 29, 1895, representatives of 42 black women's clubs from 14 states—including the Colored Women's League of Washington, the Women's Loyal Union of New York, and the Ida B. Wells Club of Chicago—gathered in Berkeley Hall for the First National Conference of the Colored Women of America, with Josephine Ruffin presiding. They convened at the hall for three days, with an extra session on August 1 at the Charles Street Church. According to the New York Times, it was "the first movement of the kind ever attempted".

In her opening address, Ruffin explained:

Our woman's movement is woman's movement in that it is led and directed by women for the good of women and men, for the benefit of all humanity, which is more than any one branch or section of it. We want, we ask the active interest of our men, and, too, we are not drawing the color line; we are women, American women, as intensely interested in all that pertains to us as such as all other American women.

Several notable speakers addressed the group. Margaret Murray Washington, the wife of Booker T. Washington, gave an influential speech titled "Individual Work for Moral Elevation". African-American women, she said, were divided into two classes: those who "had the opportunity to improve and develop mentally, physically, morally, spiritually and financially" and those who had been deprived of that opportunity by slavery. She urged members of the former class to do all they could to uplift and inspire the latter, reasoning that individual success was not enough; that only by "lifting as we climb" was it possible for the race to make progress.

Ella L. Smith, the first African-American woman to receive an M.A. degree from Wellesley College, spoke about the need for higher education. Noted scholar Anna J. Cooper spoke about the need to organize. In "The Value of Race Literature", author and former slave Victoria Earle Matthews stressed the importance of collecting literature by and about African Americans. Agnes Jones Adams gave a speech titled "Social Purity" in which she asserted that being white was not a "criterion for being American". Civil rights leader T. Thomas Fortune and social reformers Henry B. Blackwell and William Lloyd Garrison spoke about political equality. Helen Appo Cook, president of the National League of Colored Women, read a paper on "The Ideal National Union". Alexander Crummell, Anna Sprague (the daughter of Frederick Douglass), and anti-lynching activist Ida B. Wells also spoke. Other club women gave speeches on justice, temperance, and the need for industrial training.

As the convention's chaplain, Eliza Ann Gardner of Boston gave the opening benediction. Although it was not unheard of for Christian women to preach in those days, it was unusual for a woman to be given the title of chaplain. Alice T. Miller of Boston read a poem, and singers Moses Hamilton Hodges and Arianna Sparrow gave solo performances.

=== The National Federation of Afro-American Women ===
The National Federation of Afro-American Women (NFAAW) was organized during the 1895 conference, and its mission defined as:

(1) the concentration of the dormant energies of the women of the Afro-American race into one broad band of sisterhood: for the purpose of establishing needed reforms, and the practical encouragement of all efforts being put forth by various agencies, religious, educational, ethical and otherwise, for the upbuilding, ennobling and advancement of the race; (2) to awaken the women of the race to the great need of systematic effort in home-making and the divinely imposed duties of motherhood.

Delegates from the conference were elected officers for the organization, and were Margaret Murray Washington (President), Florida Ruffin Ridley (Cor. Sec.), L. C. Carter (Rec. Sec.), Libby B. Anthony (Treasurer), Mary Dickerson, Helen Crum, and Ella Mahammitt (Vice Presidents). Ruffin was nominated for treasurer but refused the position. The Woman's Era was designated as the organization's news outlet. The NFAAW held another conference in 1896, when it merged with other groups to form the National Association of Colored Women.
