= Rosa Dixon Bowser =

American educator

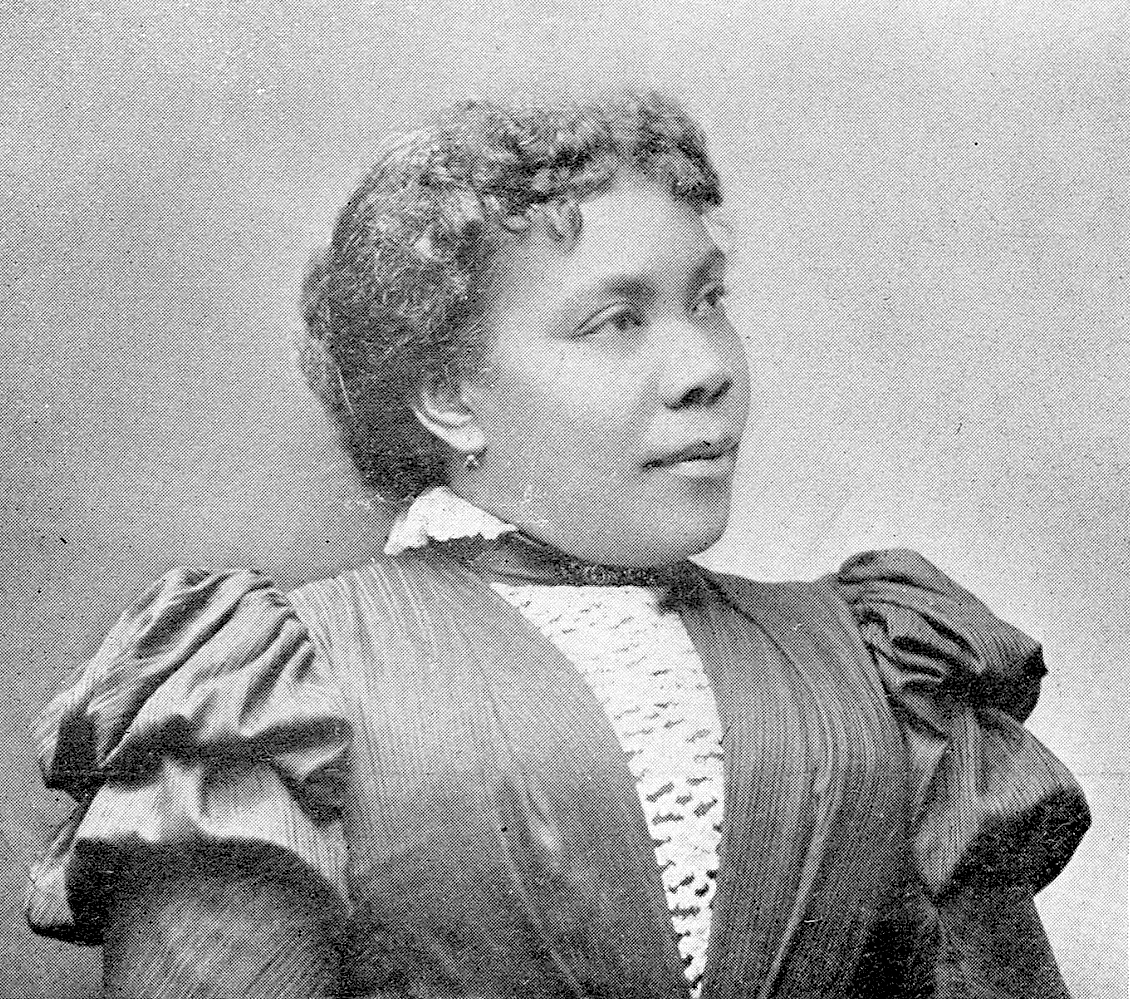
- Rosa L. Dixon Bowser, from a 1900 publication
- Born: Rosa L. Dixon; January 7, 1855; Amelia County, Virginia, United States
- Died: February 7, 1931 (aged 76); Richmond, Virginia, United States
- Occupation: Educator
- Known for: First black teacher hired in Richmond, Virginia

Rosa L. Dixon Bowser (January 7, 1855 – February 7, 1931) was an American educator. She was the first African-American teacher hired in Richmond, Virginia. She organized the Virginia Teachers' Reading Circle, which became the Virginia State Teachers Association, the first organization representing black teachers in Virginia, serving as the organization's president from 1890 to 1892. Bowser was president of the Woman's Christian Temperance Union in Virginia, as well as founder and first president of the Richmond Woman's League. She was a correspondent for the magazine The Woman's Era, and wrote essays for national publications.

== Early life ==
Rosa L. Dixon was born in Amelia County, Virginia, the daughter of Henry Dixon and Augusta Anderson Hawkins Dixon; she was "most likely born enslaved". As a child she moved to post-war Richmond with her parents, and was educated by teachers from the Freedmen's Bureau. She was identified as a promising student and trained as a teacher at the Richmond Colored Normal School.

== Career ==
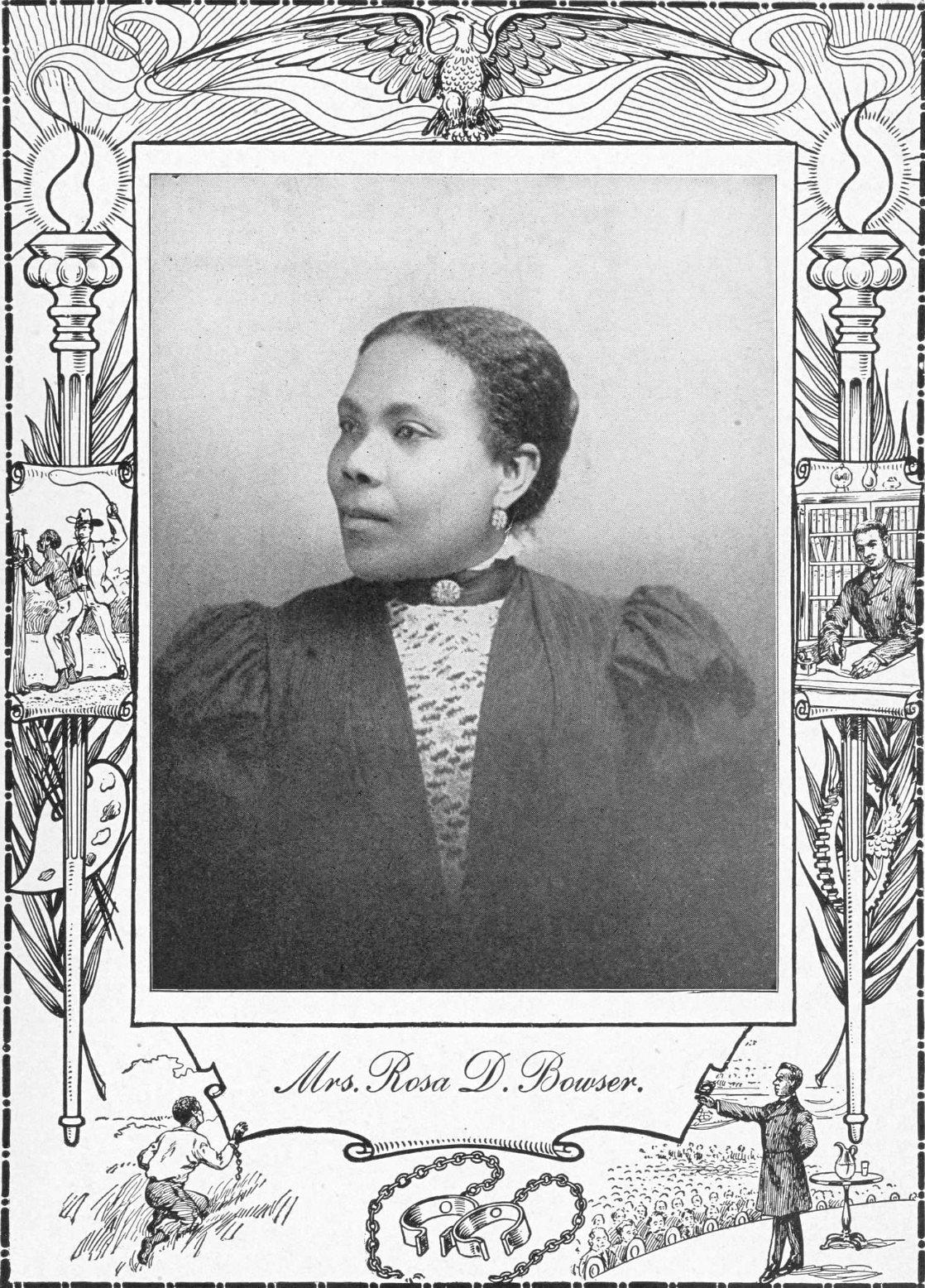
Rosa D. Bowser, from a 1902 publication

Dixon was just seventeen years old when she became the first black teacher hired by the Richmond, Virginia, public schools. She taught in schools from 1872 until 1879, and again in widowhood from 1883 until she retired in 1923. She also taught night classes for young African-American men through YMCA. She organized the Virginia Teachers' Reading Circle, which became the Virginia State Teachers Association, the first organization representing black teachers in Virginia. She served as the organization's president from 1890 to 1892.

Bowser was Virginia correspondent for the magazine Woman's Era. She wrote essays for national publications, including "What Role is the Educated Negro Woman to Play in the Uplifting of her Race?" (1902), and "The Mother's Duty to her Adolescent Sons and Daughters" (1902).

In 1902, Bowser was president of the Women's Christian Temperance Union in Virginia. She gave lectures at the annual gatherings of the Hampton Negro Conferences, and chaired the Committee on Domestic Science from 1899 to 1902. She raised funds for the Industrial Home School for Colored Girls and the Virginia Manual Labor School for Colored Boys. Bowser also served as President of the Woman's Department of the Negro Reformatory Association of Virginia.

=== Leadership and service ===
She was founder and first president of the Richmond Woman's League. She supported the Virginia Colored Anti-Tuberculosis League in Richmond, and helped to found the National Association of Colored Women's Clubs and the Virginia State Federation of Colored Women's Clubs.

She served on several executive boards for community organizations such the Southern Federation of Colored Women and the Women's Educational and Missionary Association of Virginia, as well as the standing Committee of Domestic Economy, for the Hampton Conference.

== Legacy ==
In 1925, the first branch of the Richmond Public Library to serve African-American patrons was named for Bowser.

== Personal life ==
Rosa Dixon married fellow teacher James Herndon Bowser (who was a relative of Civil War spy Mary Bowser) in 1879. Two years later, she was widowed when James died from tuberculosis. They had a son, Oswald Barrington Herndon Bowser (1880-1935), who became a medical doctor in Richmond.

Rosa Dixon Bowser died in 1931, aged 76 years. Her grave in East End Cemetery was mentioned in a 2017 New York Times essay about restoration efforts at "neglected black cemeteries". The Rosa D. Bowser School in Richmond (the former home of the Black History Museum and Cultural Center of Virginia from 1991 to 2015) was named for her.
