= Mamie B. Reese =

American clubwoman and college professor

- Mamie B. Reese, from a 1968 publication.
- Born: Mamie Bynes; September 3, 1911; Gibson, Georgia
- Died: December 15, 1997 (aged 86); Albany, Georgia
- Occupations: College professor, state official, clubwoman

Mamie Bynes Reese (September 3, 1911 – December 15, 1997) was an American clubwoman, college professor, and Georgia state official.

== Early life ==
Mamie Bynes was born in Gibson, Georgia, and raised in Macon. She earned a bachelor's degree in home economics at Spelman College in 1933, and a master's degree in education and guidance at Drake University in 1948.

== Career ==
In Georgia

Bynes taught school as a young woman. From 1948 to 1973, Reese was an associate professor of education and Dean of Women at Albany State University in Georgia. She was a charter member of the Albany, Georgia alumnae chapter of Delta Sigma Theta, when the chapter was founded in 1949, and served as the chapter president. She was president of the Southeastern Association of Colored Women's Clubs.

Reese was appointed to the Governor's Commission on the Status of Women in 1963. She served on the Georgia Board of Pardons and Paroles from 1973 to 1987, appointed by Governor Jimmy Carter. She chaired the board from July 1976 to October 1977, which made her the highest ranking Black official in Georgia in 1976. Reese was the first African-American woman to serve as Chairman of the Georgia State Board of Pardons and Paroles. "My philosophy is you can't build enough prisons to relieve or eliminate the problem," she said in 1987. "They're obsolete before they're built, and incarceration does not eliminate crime." Upon her retirement in 1987, Governor Joe Frank Harris proclaimed August 27 as "Mamie Bynes Reese Day" in Georgia.

Reese was a Georgia delegate to the Democratic National Convention in 1968, and was the first Black woman to represent Georgia at a Democratic National Convention.

National Association of Colored Women's Clubs

Reese succeeded Rosa Slade Gragg and was the 17th national president of the National Association of Colored Women's Clubs (NACWC) from 1964 to 1968. Under her leadership, the NACWC's headquarters in Washington, D.C. were renovated, and the Mary Church Terrell Memorial Library was established to preserve the organization's records. She also prioritized funding scholarships and travel for young people. In 1968, when her immediate successor Myrtle B. Ollison said "I think the police are doing a grand job" and "I've never had any trouble with discrimination," Reese gave a statement clarifying that Ollison's personal opinions did not reflect the NACWC's policies or history of activism.

== Personal life ==
Mamie Bynes married doctor William J. Reese, Sr. in 1941, in Georgia. Reese died from complications of diabetes in 1997, aged 86 years, in Albany, Georgia.
