= Ada Belle Dement =

American educator

- Born: 1888; Caldwell, Texas
- Died: November 28, 1945 (aged 56–57); Fort Worth, Texas
- Occupations: Educator, activist
- Known for: President of the National Association of Colored Women's Clubs (1941-1945)

Ada Belle Dement (1888 – November 28, 1945) was an American educator and clubwoman. In 1941, she became president of the National Association of Colored Women's Clubs (NACWC).

== Early life and education ==
In 1888, Ada Belle Dement was born in Caldwell, Texas. She studied at Prairie View College and the universities of California, Chicago, and Colorado.

== Career ==
Following her studies, Dement became a teacher at Fort Worth high school for seventeen years. In Mineral Wells, she was principal of the high school and with the support of the PTA and community built a new school for the town.

Dement was active in numerous organizations, serving as the Chairman of NACWC's Peace and Function Committee, Senior State Supervisor of Girls, and President of the Texas Federation of Colored Women's Clubs from 1930 to 1934. As Texas State President, she was responsible for starting the State Scholarship Fund; promoted the establishment of a training school for delinquent black girls and a state hospital for black tuberculosis patients; and worked with the Texas Federation of Women's Clubs. In 1942, she was awarded an Honorary Doctorate from Bishop College. In 1942 she spoke on "Victory Through Youth" to the state convention of the New Homemakers of Texas, a black student organization.

In 1941, Dement was elected 12th National President of the National Association of Colored Women's Clubs (NACWC), succeeding Jennie B. Moton. She benefited from the support of the large Texas delegation in a contested race for the NACWC Presidency. She died before the completion of her presidency. She was a vice president of the National Council of Women of the United States, and vice president of the Texas chapter of the National Negro Congress (NNC). She was active in national leadership of the Women's Auxiliary to the National Baptist Convention.

== Personal life ==
Ada Belle married a Baptist minister, Clifton DeMent. They lived in Mineral Wells, Texas. She died in 1945, aged 57, in a hospital in Fort Worth.
