= Florida Ruffin Ridley =

African-American journalist and activist (1861–1943)

- Born: Florida Yates Ruffin; January 29, 1861; Boston, Massachusetts, United States
- Died: February 25, 1943 (aged 82); Toledo, Ohio, United States
- Education: Boston Teachers' College
- Occupations: Suffragist, teacher, writer
- Known for: Civil rights activism
- Spouse: Ulysses A. Ridley (m. 1888; died 1933)
- Children: 2, including Constance Ridley Heslip
- Parent(s): Josephine St. Pierre Ruffin; George Lewis Ruffin

Florida Ruffin Ridley (born Florida Yates Ruffin; January 29, 1861 – February 25, 1943) was an African-American civil rights activist, suffragist, teacher, writer, and editor from Boston, Massachusetts. She was one of the first black public schoolteachers in Boston, and edited The Woman's Era, the country's first newspaper published by and for African-American women.

== Early life and education ==
Florida Yates Ruffin was born on January 29, 1861, to a distinguished Boston family. Her father, George Lewis Ruffin, was the first African-American graduate of Harvard Law School and the first black judge in the United States. Her mother, Josephine St. Pierre Ruffin, was a noted African-American writer, civil rights leader, and suffragist. The family lived on Charles Street in the West End.

Ridley attended Boston public schools and graduated from Boston Teachers' College in 1882. She was the second African American to teach in the Boston public schools (the first was Elizabeth Smith, who taught at the Phillips School in the 1870s). She taught at the Grant School from 1880 until her marriage in 1888 to Ulysses Archibald Ridley, owner of a tailoring business in downtown Boston. The couple moved to Brookline, Massachusetts, in 1896, where they may have been the town's first African-American homeowners. Ridley was one of the founders of the Second Unitarian Church in Brookline. She and her husband had a daughter, Constance, and a son, Ulysses A. Ridley, Jr.

== Activism ==
Following in her mother's footsteps, Ridley became politically active as a young woman. She was involved in the early women's suffrage movement and was an anti-lynching activist.

With her mother and Maria Louise Baldwin, Ridley co-founded several non-profit organizations. They founded the Woman's Era Club (later renamed the New Era Club), an advocacy group for black women, in 1893. At the club's first meeting, Ridley announced that the club would be led by black women, but open to women of any race. One club project was to raise funds for a kindergarten for the Georgia Educational League: working in its support, Ridley spent three years in Atlanta, Georgia. The women also created The Woman's Era, a newspaper for distributing club news nationally.

In 1895 they organized a national collaboration that later became the National Association of Colored Women's Clubs. Ridley and Ruffin reached out to clubs around the country to organize the First National Conference of the Colored Women of America. Ridley's role in preparation was as the corresponding secretary for the Committee on Arrangements. Ruffin led the conference, with delegates attending from women's clubs across 16 states. Speakers included the abolitionist and religious leader Eliza Ann Gardner, noted African-American scholar Anna J. Cooper, and Ella Smith, the first black woman to receive an M.A. from Wellesley College. During the conference, Ridley served on committees on lynching, the Georgia convict lease system, and Florida school laws. She also led the committee on credentials with Hannah Smith, counting 84 delegates present at the first conference session.

The immediate outcome from the conference was the formation of the National Federation of Afro-American Women, for which Ridley was appointed recording secretary. They elected Margaret Murray Washington as president. The Federation met the next year in Washington, D.C., a week after the Colored Women's League met in the same city. The two national groups merged into the National Association of Colored Women, and later appended "Clubs" to the name.

Ridley was an active suffragist through the Association, along with Ruffin, Sarah Garnet, and Mary Church Terrell. She participated in other suffragist groups too, and was active in the Brookline Equal Suffrage Association from 1894 to 1898.

In 1916, Ridley took a secreterial course at Boston University. Afterwards, she worked on World War I supportive efforts. She worked at the YWCA Hostess House at Camp Upton. From 1917 on, she was executive secretary for the Soldiers Comfort Unit. In 1918, Ridley, Ruffin, and Baldwin transformed this into the League of Women for Community Service. The League, which still exists today, provided social, educational, and charitable services for the black community. Ridley was the executive secretary until 1925. In 1923, Ridley conceived and directed an exhibit of "Negro Achievement and Abolition Memorials" at the Boston Public Library on behalf of the League.

Ridley had a special interest in black history, and also co-founded the Society for the Collection of Negro Folklore in 1890. This was one of the earliest organizations dedicated to black folklorists. She founded the Society of the Descendants of Early New England Negroes in the 1920s.

Ridley was a member of the board of directors for the Robert Gould Shaw Settlement House from 1919 to 1925. In 1929, she was elected to be the Lewis Hayden Memorial Association's secretary. She also collaborated with the Urban League.

== Writing career ==
As a journalist and essayist, Ridley wrote mainly about black history and race relations in New England. She contributed to the Journal of Negro History, The Boston Globe, and other periodicals, and also published a number of short stories. She was a member of the Saturday Evening Quill Club, a literary group organized by Boston Post editor and columnist Eugene Gordon in 1925. Fellow members included Pauline Hopkins and Dorothy West. The Saturday Evening Quill, the group's annual journal, published the work of African-American women writers and artists, including Ridley, Helene Johnson, and Lois Mailou Jones.

Ridley edited The Woman's Era, the country's first newspaper published by and for African-American women. She also was the first editor of the Social Service News, a journal produced by a collection of Boston social agencies.

== Death ==
Ridley died at her daughter's home in Toledo, Ohio, on February 25, 1943. She had two funeral services, one in Toledo and one in Boston at St. Bartholomew Episcopal. Her home on Charles Street is a stop on the Boston Women's Heritage Trail.

== Legacy ==
Ridley is included in the 2019 anthology New Daughters of Africa, edited by Margaret Busby.

In September 2020, the Florida Ruffin Ridley School in Coolidge Corner, Brookline, Massachusetts, formerly known as the Edward Devotion School, was renamed in her honor.
