= Alabama's Colored Women's Club =

African American women's clubs

An Alabama's Colored Women's Club refers to any member of the Alabama Federation of Colored Women's Club, including the "Ten Times One is Ten Club", the Tuskegee Women's Club, and the Anna M. Duncan Club of Montgomery. These earliest clubs united and created the Alabama Federation of Colored Women's Club in 1899. By 1904, there were more than 26 clubs throughout Alabama. The most active ones were in Birmingham, Selma, Mobile, Tuskegee, Tuscaloosa, Eufaula, Greensboro, and Mt. Megis.

== Early history ==
The first African American women's club in Alabama, the "Ten Times One is Ten Club" was established in Montgomery, Alabama in 1888. Laura Coleman, the founder, wanted to create a club to both improve the lives of the members and the community. It was followed by the Anna M. Duncan Club of Montgomery, established in 1897. Duncan funded the educational and civic club and during her lifetime, it was known as the Twentieth Century Club. The Duncan Club would continue its tradition of social service to the community into the twenty-first century.

== Tuskegee Women's Club ==
Under the leadership of Margaret Murray Washington the Tuskegee Women's Club was formed by female faculty and the wives of male faculty members of the Tuskegee Institute. Thirteen attended the first meeting of the club in 1895, which was meant to enlighten the members in both intellectual and moral ways. Meetings were held twice a month and new teachers were encouraged to join. Since the members were part of the academic arena, the services were related to learning and education. The Tuskegee Women's Club also helped to form new communities and construct social services. One of its pioneer actions was to provide educational and social services to the poor inhabitants of a plantation settlement.

=== Tuskegee Mothers' Club ===
One of the most successful projects of the Tuskegee Woman's Club was the sponsoring of the mothers' meeting or mothers' club. The idea of this project came up when Margaret Washington was attending the first Tuskegee Negro Conference in 1892. At the conference, her husband Booker T. Washington discussed the problems that the black male faced and gave possible solutions. This reminded Margaret Washington of the neglect of women at the time. She believed the women themselves did not realize how unimportant they were considered by their husbands and sons, and so decided to work with the women in Tuskegee and the surrounding areas by forming the Mothers' Club. There, the club worked to improve the education and grooming of local mothers. Many of them did not know their age, and they were helped to recall some incident which took place around the time of their birth in order to figure out their age. Many mothers also lacked childcare options and brought their children along. Members of the club had greater self-esteem and learned to become economically independent.

== Alabama Federation of Colored Women's Club ==
Margaret Murray Washington was the organizer and the first president of the Alabama Federation of Colored Women's Club (AFCWC), which was established on December 29, 1899. Cornelia Bowen was the leader of the group early on. During the preliminary meeting of the club there were discussions of how to address the mounting reform problem; one of the pressing needs was to establish a reformatory for African American youths. The club was very involved prison reform. The Federation was successful in getting young black prisoners released into the custody of its boys' school built at Mt. Meigs. Young lives were saved from prison by the supervision of Margaret Washington. This corrective school got less support from the state, as opposed to the white boys' reform school. The club members also supported the older prisoners with personal care and religious services. Alabama took over responsibility for the boys' reformatory school and AFCWC raised money for housing for young girls at Mt. Meigs. Prison reform being a national issue, the national office of the NACW eventually joined the program.
