= The Woman's Era =

African-American women's newspaper

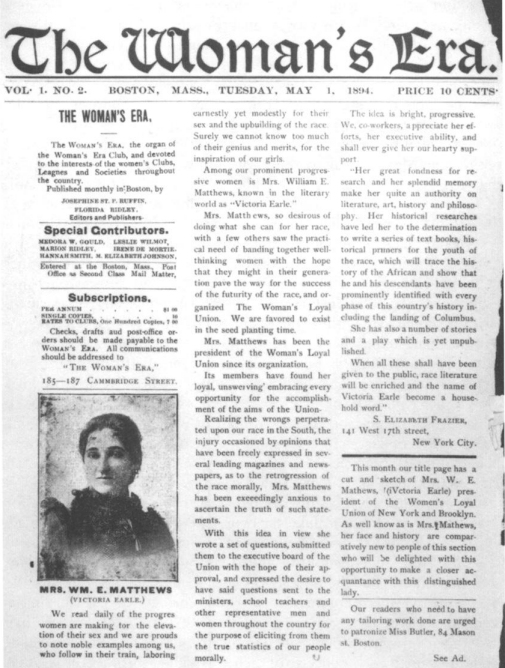
- May 1, 1894 issue featuring Victoria Earle Matthews
- Editor: Josephine St. Pierre Ruffin
- Frequency: Monthly
- Format: Print
- Founder: Josephine St. Pierre Ruffin
- Founded: 1894
- Final issue: 1897
- Country: United States
- Based in: 103 Charles Street; Boston, Massachusetts
- Language: English

The Woman's Era was the first national newspaper published by and for black women in the United States. Originally established as a monthly Boston newspaper, it became distributed nationally in 1894 and ran until January 1897, with Josephine St. Pierre Ruffin as editor and publisher. The Woman's Era played an important role in the national African American women's club movement.

== History ==
In 1892, Boston activist Josephine St. Pierre Ruffin founded the Woman's Era Club, an advocacy group for black women, with the help of her daughter, Florida Ruffin Ridley, and educator Maria Louise Baldwin. It was the first black women's club in Boston, and one of the first in the country. Its members, prominent black women from the Boston area, devoted their efforts to education, women's suffrage, and race-related issues such as anti-lynching reform. Its slogan was "Help to make the world better". The Woman's Era, an illustrated monthly publication, was the club's newspaper. Ruffin served as its editor and publisher; Ridley was also an editor. (Note: Different historians give different start dates for both the Woman's Era Club and the newspaper. According to Ruffin's descendant, Maude T. Jenkins, the club was founded in 1892. Several sources give 1897 as the last year of Ruffin's editorship but do not specify when the newspaper was discontinued. Electronic text is available online for the years 1894-1897.)

== Contents ==
This publication featured records of the Woman's Era Club activity, as well as news from other black women's clubs located all over the United States. Advertisements for local social events such as carnivals, rosebud teas, and bake sales are placed throughout the newspaper alongside the promotion of vendor goods for music, courses, clothing, real estate, among other things.

The paper also contained articles such as "Club Gossip", "Social Etiquette", and "Health and Beauty from Exercise", the Woman's Era published news about women's suffrage in Colorado (the second state to give women the vote), interviews with activists such as Victoria Earle Matthews and Ida B. Wells, a series called "Eminent Women" that included a profile of Harriet Tubman, and criticism of other activists who disappointed them, such as Frances Willard and Albion W. Tourgée. A May 1, 1894 editorial, "How to Stop Lynching", posed this question to readers:

In his very admirable and searching address delivered in this city, April 16th, judge Albion W. Tourgee proposed as a remedy to prevent the lynching of colored people at the South, that the country where lynchings occur be compelled by law to pension the wife and children of the murdered man. This, he said would make murder costly and in self defense the local authorities would put a stop to it. At first blush, this is an attractive suggestion. But why not hang the murderers? Why make a distinction between the murderers of white men and the murderers of colored men?

The editor concluded that the only solution was for the federal government to intervene:

It can go to war, spend millions of dollars and sacrifice thousands of lives to avenge the death of a naturalized white citizen slain by a foreign government on foreign soil, but cannot spend a cent to protect a loyal, native-born colored American murdered without provocation by native or alien in Alabama. Shame on such a government! The administration in power is particeps criminis with the murderers. It can stop lynching, and until it does so, it has on its hands the innocent blood of its murdered citizens.

In 1895, Ruffin organized The First National Conference of the Colored Women of America, during which the National Federation of Afro-American Women was created. The Woman's Era became the national news outlet of the club women.

== See also ==
- The First National Conference of the Colored Women of America
- National Association of Colored Women's Clubs
