= Carrie Whalon =

American suffragist

- Born: Carrie Stofer; February , 1870; Kentucky
- Died: August 28, 1927 (aged 47); Irvington, Indianapolis, Indiana
- Burial place: Floral Park Cemetery, Indianapolis, Indiana
- Other names: Carrie Jackson, Carrie Tipton
- Known for: First President of the First Colored Women's Franchise League/First Colored Woman's Suffrage Club
- Political party: Republican
- Spouse(s): William Jackson, Thomas Tipton, and John Whalon (married 1910)
- Parent(s): Jack Stofer & Minnie Berry Grubbs Williams

Carrie Whalon (1870–1927) was an African-American and Hoosier suffrage leader and the first President of the First Colored Women's Franchise League/First Colored Woman's Suffrage Club in Indianapolis. Her last name was also spelled as Whallon and Whalen in newspaper articles.

== Life and family ==
Carrie was the daughter of Jack Stofer & Minnie Berry Grubbs Williams. The 1900 census states her birth as Feb. 1870.

She married at least three times; her husbands were William Jackson, Thomas Tipton, and John Whalon (also spelled Whallon or Whallen).

She and William Jackson had two children: Louvenia Jackson Redmond & Stofer Jackson.

She married John Whalon in Louisville, Kentucky on 1 Aug 1910. They moved to Indianapolis, Indiana and the Irvington neighborhood. In 1916, Carrie purchased a "beautiful two-story frame" house at 438 South Ritter Avenue.

Carrie Whalon died in 1927.

== Suffragist ==
In 1916, Carrie Whalon hosted a Franchise League tea where Grace Julian Clarke was a speaker. In April 1916, the First Colored Women's Franchise League was organized in Indianapolis with Carrie as president. She attended the 1916 State Convention of the National Women's Suffrage Club where Carrie Chapman Catt was the speaker.

After the ratification of the 19th Amendment in 1920, women were able to vote. Carrie joined the Republican Party and was involved in the Irvington Women's Republican Club. She served as its secretary.
