= Woman's Era Club =

Woman's Era club
- Named after: The Woman's Era
- Founder: Josephine St. Pierre Ruffin
- Founded at: Boston, Massachusetts, US
- Type: Woman's club

The Woman's Era Club was an African-American women's civic organization founded in Boston, Massachusetts, in between 1892 and 1894 by Josephine St. Pierre Ruffin. The club was the first black women's club in Boston. The organization was especially well known for the conflict caused when Ruffin attempted to desegregate the General Federation of Women's Clubs (GFWC) in 1900.

== History ==
The Woman's Era Club was the first African-American women's club in Boston and was founded by Josephine St. Pierre Ruffin. The club, depending on the source, was founded anytime between 1892 and 1894. The name of the club came from the paper, The Woman's Era, though it had also earlier been called "The New Era Club." There were 113 founding members and Ruffin served as the president. Ruffin remained president of the Woman's Era Club until 1903.

In addition to black women, the club also admitted white women. The purpose of the club was to do charity work, personal improvement and philanthropy. At the time, it was one of the largest women's clubs for African Americans at the time. Topics that the club discussed included lynching and women's suffrage. Ruffin wanted the club to help with "racial uplift" and also "urban progressivism and the crusade for the rights of women." It was also important to the club to publicize progress that black people made. The club's motto was "make the world better," which were also the last words of Lucy Stone.

In 1895, the Woman's Era Club proposed a national conference for African-American women. This led to the National Conference of the Colored Women of America, the first conference of black women in the United States which took place in July 1895. In 1901, the club moved its headquarters to Tremont Temple in Boston. Some sources state that Ruffin was president of the club until 1903, however, The New York Age reported that Ruffin was still president of the club in 1910. In addition, they were now meeting at the Robert Gould Shaw House. The Woman's Era Club eventually merged with the National Association of Colored Women's Clubs (NACW).

=== Conflict with GFWC ===
The Woman's Era Club joined the Massachusetts State Federation of Women's Clubs in 1895. Later, the club was admitted to the General Federation of Women's Clubs (GFWC) because the president, Rebecca Douglas Lowe, did not realize that she had admitted a black women's club. By April 1900, Lowe had mailed the certificate of GFWC membership to Ruffin and the Woman's Era Club had paid their dues.

In June 1900, Ruffin attended the fifth biennial convention of the GFWC in Milwaukee as a delegate for the Woman's Era Club. Ruffin was offered a delegate seat as a representative from the two other mostly white women's clubs instead, but she demanded that Woman's Era Club be recognized. The Massachusetts state federation of clubs then introduced a resolution that the GFWC formally admit the Woman's Era Club. However, this resolution was defeated by women in several southern state delegations led by the Georgia state federation. Ruffin attempted to sue GFWC and hoped that Booker T. Washington would help, but the suit never happened and Washington did not help.

The attempt of the Woman's Era Club to join the GFWC became a contested issue among the clubwomen. Ruffin was sent to be a delegate of the next GFWC convention in 1902.

Publicity about the controversy, known as the "Ruffin incident," was generally complimentary to Ruffin and to black women in general. The Decatur Herald wrote that Ruffin's request for membership helped bring a positive light to the question of progress for black women in the United States. However, The Evening Transcript on the other hand, wrote that black women's clubs in the South did not approve of Ruffin's move because they did not want to create discord or lose the support of white women's clubs who were helping in their own communities.

== Notable members ==
- Agnes Jones Adams, served on executive board.
- Maria Louise Baldwin, served on executive board.
- Alice A. Casneau, a Boston dressmaker and clubwoman.
- Eliza Ann Gardner, served as chaplain and in the organizing committee.
- Florida Ruffin Ridley, served as secretary.
- Josephine St. Pierre Ruffin, served as president.

== See also ==
- The Woman's Era
- National Association of Colored Women's Clubs (NACW)
- First National Conference of the Colored Women of America
