= Victoria Earle Matthews =

American author and activist (1861–1907)

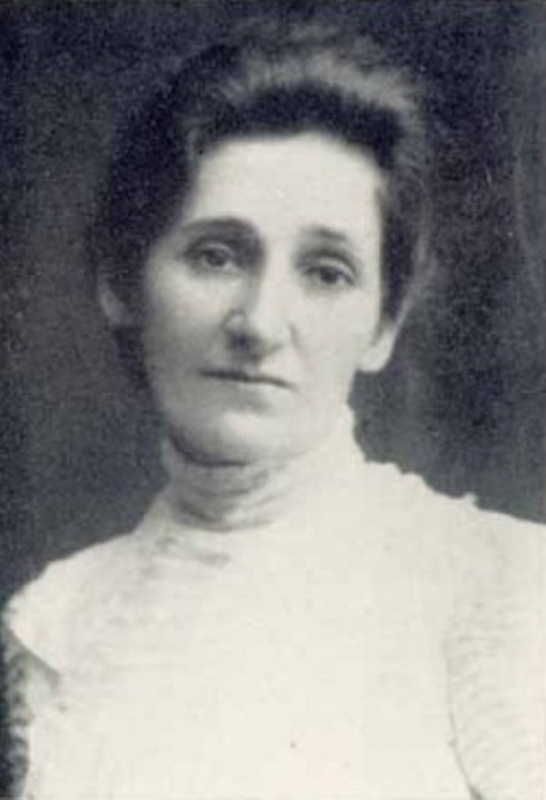
- Born: Ella Victoria Smith; May 27, 1861; Fort Valley, Georgia, U.S.
- Died: March 10, 1907 (aged 45); New York City, U.S.
- Occupations: Writer, activist

Victoria Earle Matthews (née Ella Victoria Smith, May 27, 1861 – March 10, 1907) was an American author, essayist, newspaperwoman, settlement worker, and activist. She was born into slavery in Fort Valley, Georgia, and moved to New York City with her family after emancipation. There, she briefly attended school and worked as a domestic servant to help her family.

As a married woman, Matthews became involved in women's clubs and social work, at a time when the settlement movement started in Great Britain in 1884 and was influencing American social work in major cities. In 1897, Matthews founded the White Rose Industrial Home for Working Class Negro Girls, also known as the White Rose Mission, a settlement house for young Black Women, to provide them with safe housing, education, and life and job skills.

== Biography ==
Victoria Earle was born into slavery on May 27, 1861, in Fort Valley, Georgia, a month before the start of the Civil War. Shortly after she was born, her mother, Caroline Smith, escaped from their master, leaving behind Victoria and her eight siblings. The Smith family's racial ambiguity, and the fact that the children lived in the master's house, conforms to the belief that their owner was their father. When her mother reached New York, she planned to earn enough money to purchase her freedom and that of her children. Caroline Smith conducted a legal battle to gain custody of her daughters and she was the first black woman to be recognized in Georgia's court system. Matthews, her mother, and her sister, Anna, traveled from Georgia to Richmond and Norfolk, Virginia, and eventually, ended up in New York City in 1873. In New York, Matthews attended public school for only four years, until family difficulties forced Matthews to withdraw from public school and work as a domestic servant, where she took advantage of her employer's full home library. The owner discovered Earle reading and gave her permission to do so when she had time. In order to read and learn, Earle worked harder to finish tasks early. The New York Freeman, a Catholic newspaper, described Matthews as "ever ready and obliging". Later, on October 22, 1879, at the age of eighteen, Victoria Smith married William E. Matthews, a coachman from Petersburg, Virginia. They had one son, Lamartine, who died on September 19, 1895, at the age of sixteen. On March 10, 1907, at the age of forty-five, Victoria Earle Matthews died of tuberculosis.

== Career ==
Victoria Earle Matthews's work began as a journalist in 1887. The Washington Bee introduced her as a journalist that was "the foremost of her sex of our race".

== Activism ==
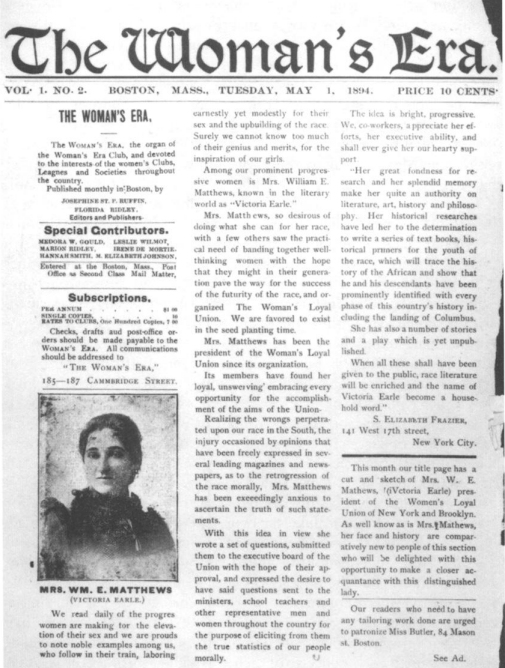
Matthews featured in The Woman's Era, a newspaper edited by Josephine St. Pierre Ruffin, May 1, 1894

=== Civil rights work ===
In the early 1890s, Matthews became more involved in the African-American political and social circles. On October 5, 1892, Victoria Earle Matthews and educator and activist, Maritcha Remond Lyons, organized a testimonial dinner in New York's Lyric Hall for Ida B. Wells and her anti-lynching campaign which led to the founding of the Woman's Loyal Union of New York and Brooklyn. It was a time of the rise of fraternal and women's organizations, and Matthews served as the first president of the Woman's Loyal Union (WLU). The WLU was a civil rights organization that worked against racial discrimination and supported the anti-lynching crusade of the journalist Ida B. Wells. Matthews served as the chairman of the executive board in 1896 of the National Association of Colored Women. She frequently spoke on the issues of the times. Matthews was best known for her speeches "The Value of Race Literature", "The Role of Afro-American Women", and "The Awakening of the Afro-American Woman" (1897). "The Value of Race Literature was delivered at the First National Congress of Colored Women in Boston, Massachusetts on July 30th, 1895. Her speeches were rooted in the philosophy of race pride and self-worth.

=== Settlement work ===
After the death of her 16-year-old son, Lamartine, Matthews channeled her grief and began to concentrate on helping young people of his age. She returned to the South, having read about the continuing need for education for blacks. In the state of Alabama, she began looking into what was being done for people of color. Eventually, she became involved in settlement work, started by Progressive women in industrial cities such as Chicago and New York, which were accepting tens of thousands of European immigrants, as well as many migrants from the rural South. A minister persuaded her to return to New York.

Matthews began to visit individuals and families where the need seemed great. She went from house to house providing practical services, such as helping an over-burdened mother prepare a meal, or do laundry. Matthews learned that life for African Americans was difficult and plagued with "limited economic opportunities, inadequate housing, poverty, prejudice, and racially motivated violence."

At this time, thousands of young blacks were arriving in New York as part of the Great Migration, in hopes of finding better work and opportunities than in the Jim Crow South. Matthews thought that young women needed a safe place to stay while they learned job skills to allow them to work.

Of mixed race, she had considerable European heritage; her fair skin and appearance, combined with her education, this enabled her to gain preferential treatment. She investigated business practices among both whites and blacks during this time period. With the initial help of Winthrop Phelps, a white philanthropist who offered a flat in an apartment house he owned, on February 11, 1897, they opened a place where colored girls could go for training in domestic work. Matthews arranged for them to learn to sew, to make dresses and to prepare for service in society. Matthews valued education and made it a part of the programs she offered. She intended to make classes for boys on domestic services. Matthews trained young African American girls in right-living and self-help. In addition to life skills in math, reading and writing, Matthews educated her students in race history and literature. She maintained a collection of books on black history that was an available resource to all.

Realizing that young women were at risk when they arrived in the city, Matthews and her supporters decided to set up a place that would offer housing, as well as to have volunteers meet new migrants at train stations, to offer their safe housing. They purchased a house on 217 East 86th street, which was called the White Rose Home for Working Class Negro Girls, or the White Rose Mission. Matthews encouraged the girls to live with purity, goodness and virtue. To support the mission, she gained the support of prominent black ministers and major congregations, such as Adam Clayton Powell, Sr., pastor of the Abyssinian Baptist Church, who became a trustee of the mission.

Matthews took pride in her race; she also sought to inspire individuals by equipping them with practical skills. She believed that with self-sufficiency, they could have noble thoughts, and great ideas. Matthews and her volunteers taught young women the skills needed at the time: sewing, millinery, and cooking. The young women had the chance to get decent, if low paid work. The White Rose Industrial Home allowed for students to be around their teachers, learning from them and each other in daily life, as well as to have some protection for a time. The White Rose Home also provided specific education and a range of social activities. The mission offered recreation, literary and cultural events, and classes on Negro history.

Matthews was also a member of the board of directors for McDonough Memorial Dispensary, a hospital that would serve Black people and all nationalities.

== Notable publications ==
=== Short stories ===
Victoria Earle Matthews wrote short stories. She focused on promoting a consciousness of the Black struggle, specifically Black women. All of these works feature benevolent, black, female protagonists that represent the conflicts of colorism and learn to develop dignity in their blackness.

==== 1893. Aunt Lindy: A Story Founded on Real Life ====
A fire in Fort Valley, Georgia, decimates half the town despite the townsfolks best efforts to extinguish it. The town's physician, Dr. Bronson, has his hands full with the victims of the fire. He seeks the help of an old black nurse who lives on the outskirts of town. Aunt Lindy and her husband Joel are a kind and devoutly Christian couple. Their busy lives keep their sorrows away by day. At night, they mourn the children that were ripped away.

Aunt Lindy tends to her patients as if they were her own children. A critically hurt victim of the fire is placed in her care. Upon a closer look, Aunt Lindy recognized in him her former master. She gets transported back in time to when she labored as his slave. A thirst for vengeance clouds her Christian morals. She contemplates killing the source of her pain while he's hurt and at her mercy.

"Marse Jeems" wakes up disorientated. When he blurrily makes out her dark features he too goes back in time. While she relives the worst years of her life, he remembers the most pleasant years of his. Aunt Lindy passionately demands to know the whereabouts of her scattered children. Her anger is getting the best of her when an ongoing sermon a couple houses down steals her attention. The words of the preacher wash over her and she remembers herself. The rage recedes and she emerges determined to save her tormentor. Freshly healed, James cannot fathom how Aunt Lindy tolerated saving his life. In appreciation, he buys the couple their cabin and confirms the identity of one of their sons. He was the new preacher whose words saved Aunt Lindy from falling into sin.

===== Audience Reception =====
Matthews implements symbolism, the fire, to represent the emotional turmoil Aunt Lindy is experiencing. Amina Gautier wrote "the fire of retribution sweeps through Lindy, burning away all thoughts of Christian forgiveness." Negroes were forced to bury their emotions. Postbellum society did not wish to hear or address the woes of the emancipated slave. Aunt Lindy's emotions bubbled up to the surface after years of keeping up appearances and suffering in secret. Matthews insinuates that people should not impose restrictions on how emancipated slaves should and should not feel. The wronged need the chance to confront their feelings of bitterness and resentment if the country is to move on.

==== 1892. Eugenie's Mistake: A Story ====
Adele Van Arsden grew up in France under the care of Mme. Charmet. With her father's passing she inherits his plantation in Louisiana, a place as foreign to her as her father's embrace. Adele finds a friend in Eugenie St. Noire, who delights in acquainting her with country life.

Royal Clifford, master of Clifford Hall, is enjoying the sights in Van Arsden Park when he comes upon Adele peacefully sleeping in a grotto. He is instantly taken with her and saves her from a reptile. The pair fall in love and get married; happily oblivious to the hatred that fills their friends heart. Eugenie is obsessed with procuring the means for disgracing Adele and taking her place at Royal's side. She takes note of the obscurity surrounding Adele's past, her mother dying in childbirth and her father shipping her off abroad.

When Royal is away, Eugenie orchestrates a scene at the grotto the lovers first met. Adele is presented with a correspondence of her late father's where he reveals that Adele's mother was a mulatto. Adele is distraught. Her ignorance has surely condemned her loving husband to a future of shame and ridicule. The thought of him looking at her with contempt instead of love and adoration proves too much. She flees to France, unable to face the man she unknowingly deceived. Royal is inconsolable. He accuses his widowed mother of being responsible for what has happened.

Five miserable years pass as Old Mammy keeps the letter that ruined her mistresses life hidden. Upon discovering the letter, Royal's heart swells with hope. He hurries to France and pleads with Mme. Charmet to let him see Adele. Their reunion consists of passionate pleas for forgiveness. Royal reveals that his mother was an octoroon. All these years he had thought Adele had somehow learned the truth and left him for it. The couple reconcile and decide to leave the toxic Louisiana terrain behind and start anew in France. Eugenie was mistaken, Adele's familial lineage did nothing to demean her in the eyes of her husband.

===== Audience Reception =====
According to Amina Gautier, Matthews debunks the notion that nothing ails the emancipated slave. The couple's newfound freedom does not erase the years of abuse they suffered under slavery. Adele and Joel lost their kids and that is not something they can just get over. The loss weighs on them just as heavily in postbellum life as it did before emancipation. They are enduring life instead of enjoying it.

==== 1892. Zelika- A Story ====
Zelika is a slave on the Claiborne plantation, in Atlanta, Georgia. Her fair complexion and the favor of her mistress earns her the privilege to learn to read and write. Zelika enjoys liberties like reading to her old master. Here, at master Claiborne's bedside she forges a connection with a fellow slave, King George.

With Zelika's patient guidance, King George learns to read and write. His new found literacy is a blessing and a curse. He grows aware of his own ignorance, his crippled manhood, and the need to break free from the shackles of slavery. On her way back from an errand, Zelika falls into step with King George. The cadence and tenderness she sees in his features fills her with dread. This was goodbye, he was escaping into the night, hoping to join the Union army. Zelika weeps and pleads with him to stay. King George's heart swells, her tears are the push he needed to reveal his own love for her. Zelika bids him goodbye and promises to wait for him.

As General Sherman makes his way to Atlanta, Zelika sits at her old masters deathbed. All the other slaves are long gone. Mr. Claiborne makes Zelika promise to abide by the contents of a letter he gives her. Zelika puts off reading the letter, fearing it might somehow come between her and her love. Ever day at dusk and dawn she lingers by the road, waiting for her King George to return to her. The day finally comes when she embraces her limping, one handed, starving, and exhausted George King, as is his free name. They cry in each other's arms in happiness. When they read master Claiborne's letter, it is revealed that Zelika is a Claiborne. He gives them the location of a flowerbed that sits atop buried riches that now belong to her. Zelika is elated. George King's health will be taken care of and they can live out their days together, far away from Atlanta.

== Legacy ==
The all-black Victoria Earle Matthews (Mothers) Club, named after her, helped girls and women who had been sexually abused or threatened with such. Victoria Earle Matthews is also recognized by some as the first Black social worker in New York and a pioneer for the current social welfare system. Matthews is remembered with a plaque saying, "The White Rose Home" on the brownstone of her Brooklyn residence at 33 Poplar Street.
