= Margaret Murray Washington =

American academic

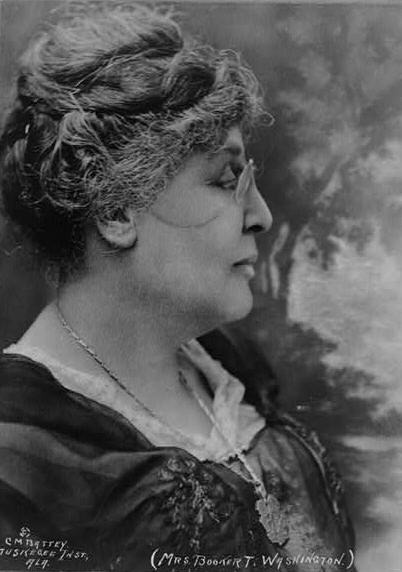
- Washington in 1915
- Born: March 9, 1865; Macon, Mississippi, U.S.
- Died: June 4, 1925 (aged 60); Tuskegee, Alabama, U.S.
- Known for: Anti-lynching activism
- Spouse: Booker T. Washington (m. 1893; died 1915)

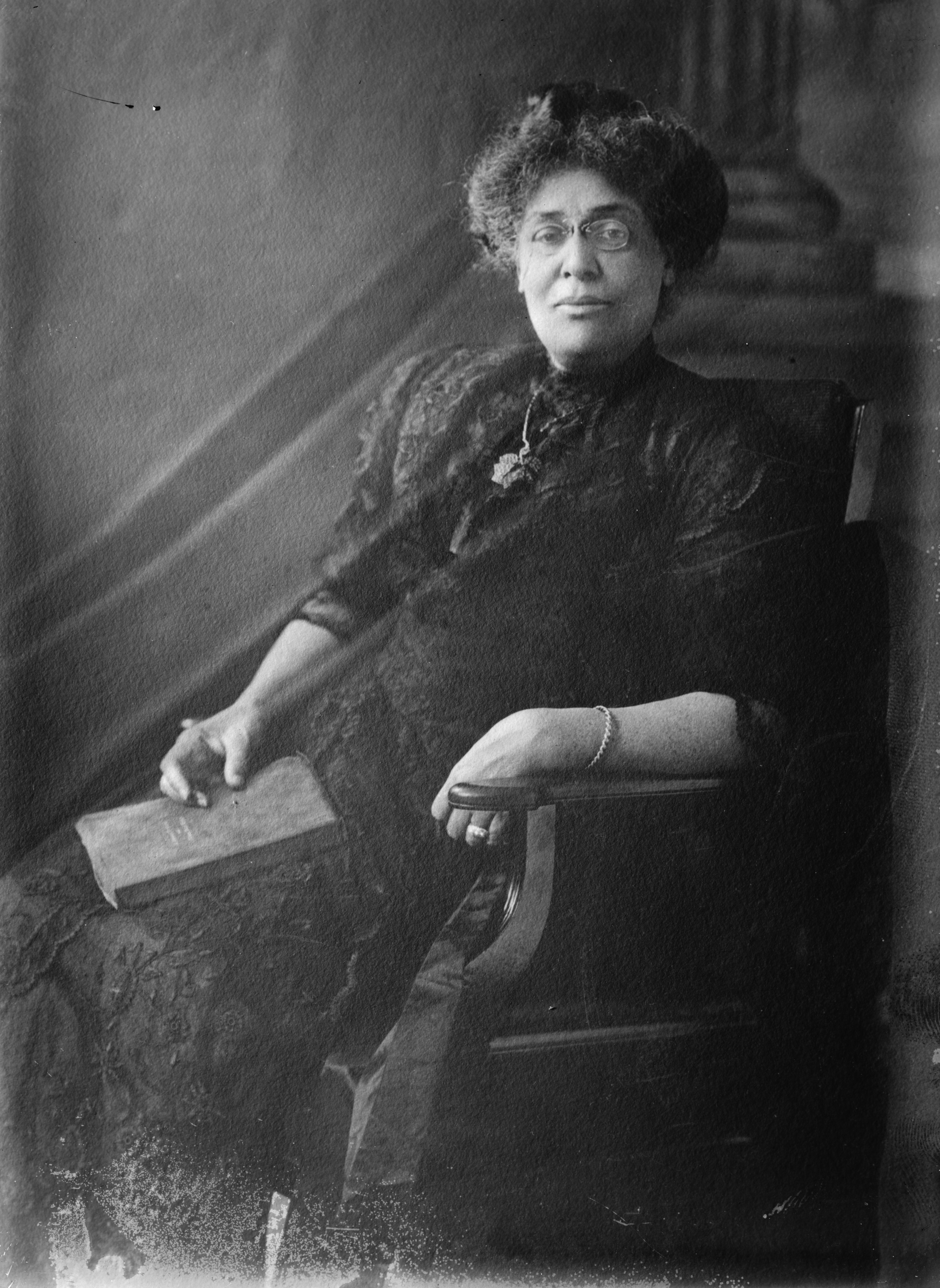
Margaret James Murray

Margaret Murray Washington (née Murray; March 9, 1865 – June 4, 1925) was an American educator who was the principal of Tuskegee Normal and Industrial Institute, which later became Tuskegee University. She also led women's clubs, including the Tuskegee Woman's Club and the National Federation of Afro-American Women. She was the third wife of Booker T. Washington. She was inducted into the Alabama Women's Hall of Fame in 1972.

== Biography ==
Margaret Murray was born on March 9 in Macon, Mississippi, in the early 1860s. Her birth year is unknown; her tombstone says she was born in 1865, but the 1870 census lists her birth year as 1861. She was one of ten children born to sharecroppers; an Irish immigrant father and a black American mother, a washerwoman and possibly former slave. Her father died when she was seven, and the day after his death she began living with a Quaker couple by the name of Sanders. They encouraged her to become a teacher, one of the few occupations available to women at the time.

As a child, Murray spent much of her time reading and quickly excelled in school. By the age of fourteen, she was so advanced in her studies that the school offered her a teaching position. Determined to further her teaching career, at the age of nineteen, Murray enrolled in Fisk University, where she completed the college preparatory course in five years and completed college in four.

=== Marriage ===
Murray met Booker T. Washington at Fisk University. Regarding her as a model student, Washington asked her to assume the position of lady principal, which had formerly been held by his deceased second wife, Olivia A. Davidson. By 1890, Murray was writing to Washington to express her deep feelings for him. He proposed the following year and, after some hesitation, Murray accepted Washington's proposal, and they were married in 1893. Murray and Washington shared a home with Washington's relatives and his children from his previous marriage until they moved into The Oaks, the homestead which the Tuskegee Institute built for their family in 1901. Washington was reportedly reluctant to share his feelings with Murray, and often left her to tend his children while he was away on business. Though Washington still mourned the loss of his first two wives, he believed that Margaret provided a well-ordered household, and the two were reportedly happy with their marriage. Margaret wrote Washington's speeches and she helped her husband in expanding the school and traveled with him on his tours and speaking engagements.

=== Career ===
In 1890, Murray was hired as lady principal of Tuskegee Institute. In this role, she was responsible for supervising women students and supporting women on Tuskegee's faculty. She established the women's division curriculum for the lower and post-graduate division in sewing, laundering, millinery, soap-making, table-setting, cooking, and broom-making.

During her tenure as lady principal of Tuskegee, she also created the Tuskegee Woman's Club. A significant endeavor of the Woman's Club was the restoration of the Elizabeth Russell plantation, located eight miles outside of Tuskegee. The place was described by Washington as an area populated with former convicts, where children were undisciplined and the homes were unkempt. For twelve years, she, alongside other social reformers in Tuskegee, sought to rehabilitate this community through the strengthening of family structures. Implementing Tuskegee's "Bath, Broom, and Bible" program, she centered her social-uplift theory around improving motherhood and wifehood.

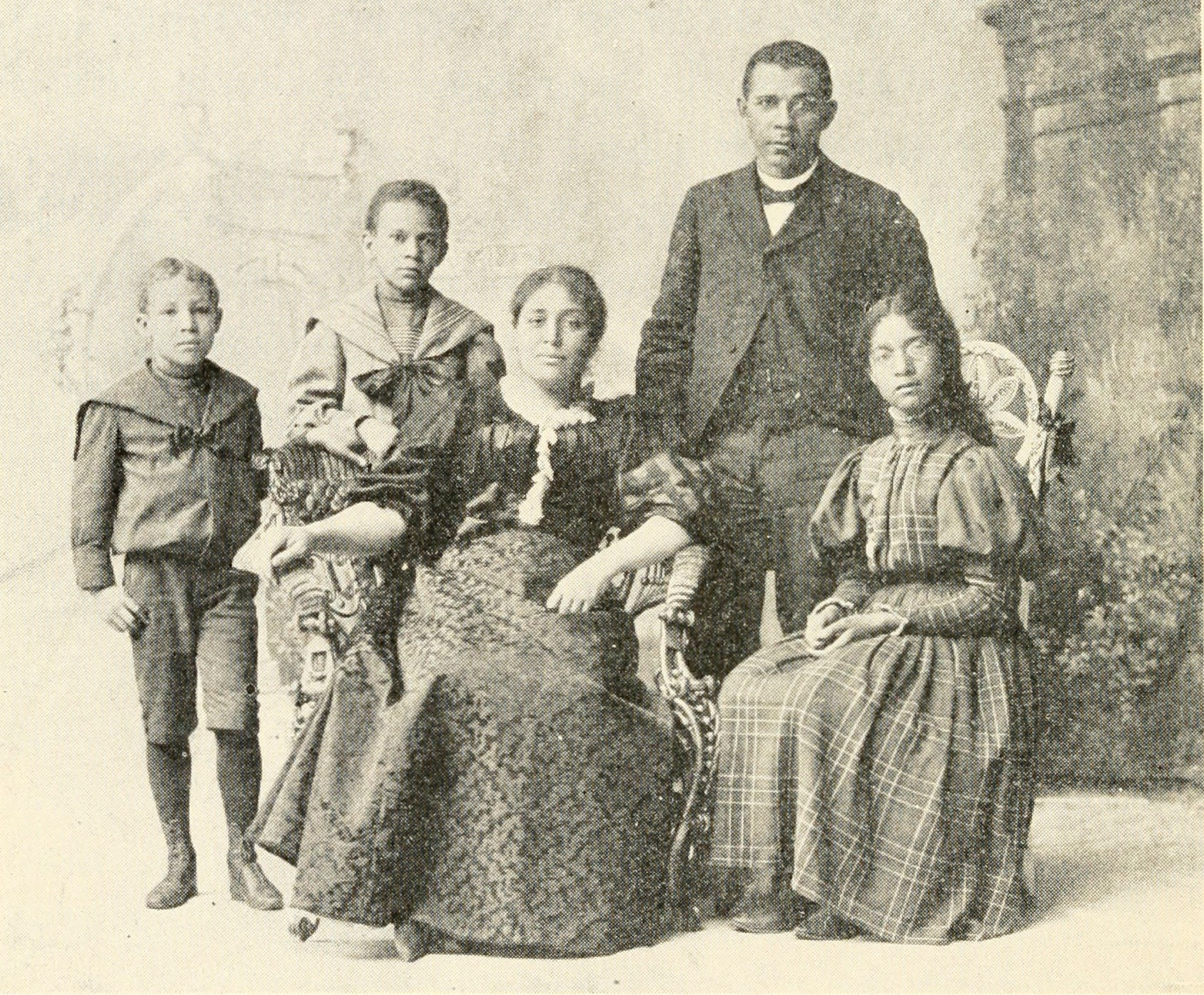
Margaret Murray Washington (center) with Booker T. Washington and their children.

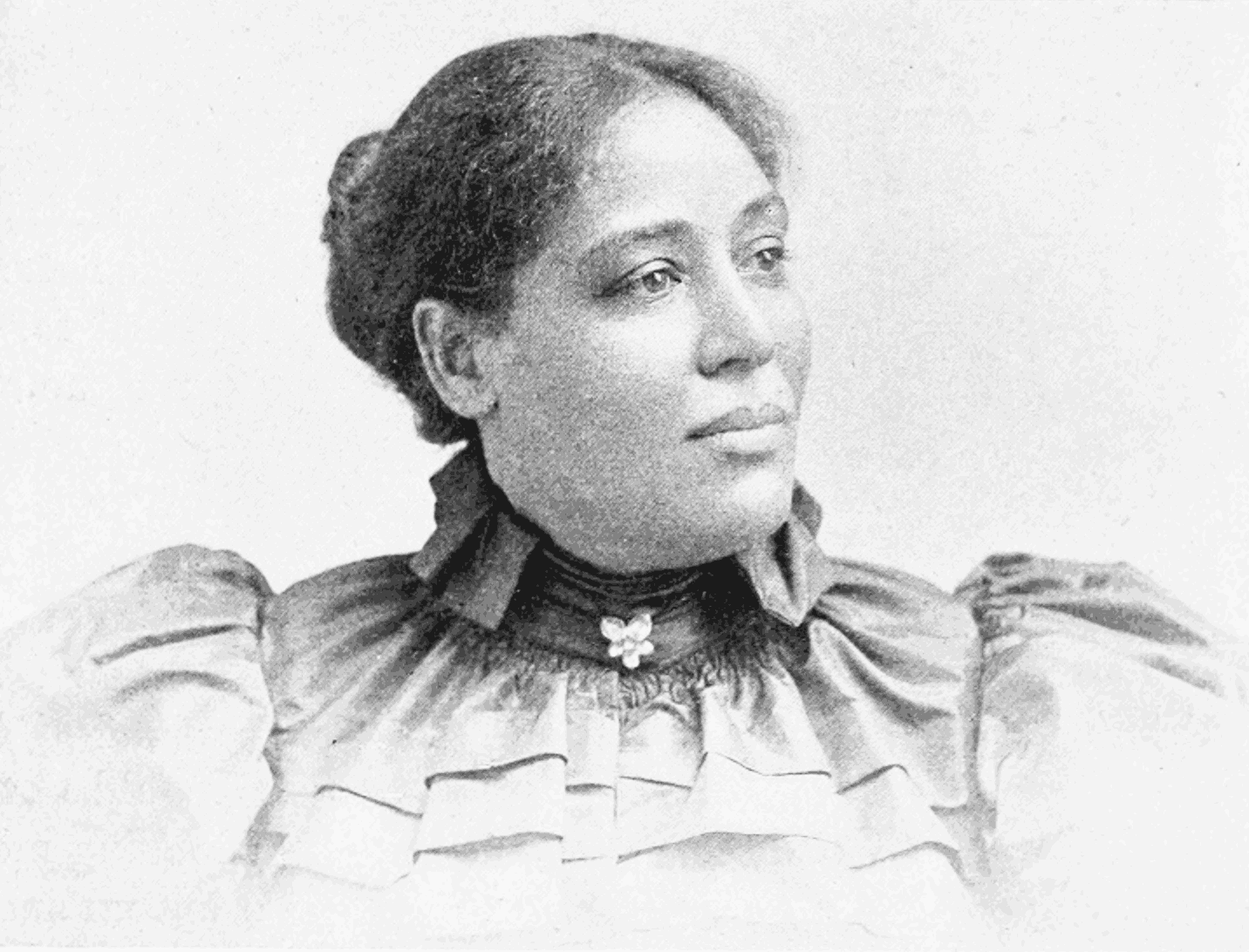
Margaret Murray Washington, 1899

The Tuskegee Woman's Club later merged local organizations with women clubs to help improve the values and liberation of womanhood in black women of the Jim Crow south. In 1895 she gave an influential speech titled "Individual Work for Moral Elevation" at the First National Conference of the Colored Women of America and was elected President of the newly established National Federation of Afro-American Women. As President, Washington insisted that the thrust of the organization be "industrial training and practical housewifery." This differed from some women's clubs in the North, such as the Colored Women's League of Washington, D.C., headed by Mary Church Terrell, which refused to join the newly formed National Federation of Afro-American Women She is credited with co-founding the National Association of Colored Women in 1896. She founded country schools, taught women how to live and attend to their homes, worked for the improvement of prisons, started the Mt. Meigs School for boys and an industrial school for girls at Tuskegee, and constantly worked for the betterment of the poor and neglected. She succeeded Elizabeth Carter Brooks and became the fifth president (1912–1916) for the National Association of Colored Women.

After the death of her husband in 1915, Washington worked to improve the educational system for black Americans. She became deeply involved in domestic education for mothers in Tuskegee and in supporting schools for children at surrounding plantations.

As with the programs advocated by her husband, Margaret Murray Washington focused on domestic and vocational education. She became involved in interracial cooperation and participated in the Memphis Women's Inter-Racial Conference in 1920.

=== Death ===
Margaret Murray Washington remained at The Oaks until her death in 1925. She is buried in the university cemetery, next to her husband.

== Legacy ==
In 1972, Washington was inducted into the Alabama Women's Hall of Fame.

Washington was inducted as an honorary member of Delta Sigma Theta sorority.

M.M. Washington Career High School in Washington, DC was named in her honor. The school closed in 2008. Also named for her is a building on the Tuskegee campus.

Washington appears as a character in the 2020 Netflix miniseries Self Made, played by Kimberly Huie.

== Anti-lynching activist ==
Around the turn of the century, many black people in the South were victims of lynching. With the increasing numbers of lynchings of blacks, many organizations started to form during this period. In 1895 a large group of black women formed the National Federation of Afro-American Women, and Washington was elected the president.

This organization addressed an array of issues, from helping women in the south that were trying to buy a house, to opening a daycare which gave women an opportunity to go to work. The union of the NFAA and the Washington Colored League formed the National Federation of Afro-American Women. Washington believed that many racial issues could be fixed through interracial cooperation.

In 1920, a National Association of Colored Women Conference was held in Tuskegee, Alabama. The main topic on the agenda was lynching. Many of the recently founded anti-lynching organizations in attendance expressed their support of a bill that defined lynching as an act of murder and that the killer had to suffer repercussions for their actions. Two important white women in attendance, Carrie Parks Johnson and Sara Estelle Haskins, from the Southern Methodist Women's Committee, were invited to Washington's home. Both women were surprised at the huge number of highly educated black middle-class women there.

== Quotes ==
- "If we wish to help each other let us not only praise ourselves, but also criticize. Plain talk will not hurt us."
- "Praise a child always and he soon gets to the point where he thinks it impossible for him to make mistakes."
- "We cannot separate ourselves from our people, no matter how much we try; for one, I have no desire to do so."
- " The condition of our race, brought about by slavery, the ignorance, poverty, intemperance, ought to make us women know that in half a century we cannot afford to lose sight of the large majority of the race who have not, as yet, thrown off the badge of the evils which I have just mentioned."

== Selected works ==
- Washington, Margaret Murray (1894). Work for the Colored Women of the South. Tuskegee: Normal School Press.
