= Josephine St. Pierre Ruffin =

African-American publisher, journalist, civil rights leader, suffragist, and editor

- Born: Josephine St. Pierre; August 31, 1842; Boston, Massachusetts, U.S.
- Died: March 13, 1924 (aged 81); Boston, Massachusetts, U.S.
- Burial place: Mount Auburn Cemetery, Cambridge, Massachusetts, U.S.
- Occupations: Publisher, journalist, activist
- Spouse: George Lewis Ruffin (m. 1858; died 1886)
- Children: 5, including Florida Ruffin Ridley
- Parent(s): John St. Pierre; Elizabeth Matilda Menhenick

Josephine St. Pierre Ruffin (née St. Pierre; August 31, 1842 – March 13, 1924) was a publisher, journalist, civil rights leader, suffragist, abolitionist, and editor of the Woman's Era, the first national newspaper published by and for African-American women.

== Early years and education ==
Ruffin was born in Boston, Massachusetts, to John St. Pierre, of French and African descent from Martinique, and Elizabeth Matilda Menhenick from Cornwall, England. Her father was a successful clothier and founder of a Boston Zion Church. She attended public schools in Charlestown and Salem, and a private school in New York City because of her parents' objections to the segregated schools in Boston. She completed her studies at the Bowdoin School (not to be confused with Bowdoin College), after segregation in Boston schools ended.

When she was 16 years old, she married George Lewis Ruffin (1834–1886), who later became the first African-American graduate from Harvard Law School, the first African American elected to the Boston City Council, and the first African-American municipal judge. The couple moved to Liverpool but returned to Boston soon afterwards and bought a house in the West End.

== Activism ==
Working with her husband, Ruffin became active in the abolitionist movement. During the American Civil War, they helped recruit black soldiers for the Union Army, specifically the 54th and 55th Massachusetts regiments. They also worked for the Sanitation Commission, which provided aid for the care of soldiers in the field. After the war ended, Ruffin turned her attention to organizing for the Kansas Freedmen's Relief Association, collecting money and clothes to send to aid southern blacks resettling in Kansas, known as Exodusters.

Ruffin supported women's suffrage and, in 1869, joined with Julia Ward Howe and Lucy Stone to form the American Woman Suffrage Association (AWSA) in Boston. A group of these women, Howe and Stone also founded the New England Women's Club in 1868. Josephine Ruffin became its first black member when she joined in the mid-1890s.

Ruffin founded the first black woman's newspaper, The Woman's Era. She also wrote for the black weekly paper, The Courant, and became a member of the New England Woman's Press Association.

In 1910, Ruffin helped form the Boston chapter of the National Association for the Advancement of Colored People (NAACP). She also wrote a special suffrage edition of The Crisis in 1915.

=== The Woman's Era ===
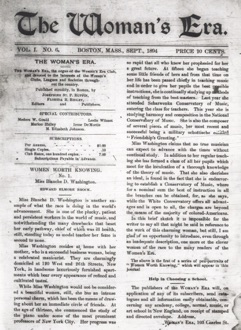
Front page of The Woman's Era, September 1894

When her husband George died at the age of 52 in 1886, Ruffin used her financial security and organizational abilities to start the Woman's Era, the country's first newspaper published by and for African-American women. She served as the editor and publisher from 1890 to 1897. While promoting interracial activities, the Woman's Era called on black women to demand increased rights for people of their race.

=== Club work ===
In 1891, Ruffin served as the first president of Boston's Co-Worker's Club. In 1894, Ruffin organized the Woman's Era Club, an advocacy group for black women, with the help of her daughter Florida Ridley and Maria Baldwin, a Boston school principal.

In 1895, Ruffin organized the National Federation of Afro-American Women with Julia O. Henson. She convened the First National Conference of the Colored Women of America in Boston, which was attended by women from 42 black women's clubs from 14 states. The following year, the organization merged with the Colored Women's League to form the National Association of Colored Women's Clubs (NACWC). Mary Church Terrell was elected president and Ruffin served as one of the organization's vice-presidents.

Just as the NACWC was forming, Ruffin was integrating the New England Woman's Club. When the General Federation of Women's Clubs met in Milwaukee in 1900, she planned to attend as a representative of three organizations: the Woman's Era Club, the New England Woman's Club and the New England Woman's Press Club. Southern women were in positions of power in the General Federation and, when the executive committee discovered that all of the New Era's club members were black, they would not accept Ruffin's credentials. Ruffin was told that she could be seated as a representative of the two white clubs but not the black one. She refused on principle and was excluded from the proceedings. These events became known as "The Ruffin Incident" and were widely covered in newspapers around the country, most of whom supported Ruffin. Afterwards, the Woman's Era Club made an official statement "that colored women should confine themselves to their clubs and the large field of work open to them there."

The New Era Club was disbanded in 1903, but Ruffin remained active in the struggle for equal rights. Along with other women who had belonged to the New Era Club, she co-founded the League of Women for Community Service, which still exists today.

== Personal life ==
Ruffin and her husband had five children: Hubert, an attorney; Florida Ridley, a school principal and co-founder of Woman's Era; Stanley, an inventor; George, a musician; and Robert, who died before his first birthday.

She died of nephritis at her home on St. Botolph Street, Boston, in 1924, and was buried in Mount Auburn Cemetery, Cambridge.

== Legacy ==
In 1995, Ruffin was inducted into the National Women's Hall of Fame.

In 1999 a series of six tall marble panels with a bronze bust in each was added to the Massachusetts State House; the busts are of Ruffin, Florence Luscomb, Mary Kenney O'Sullivan, Dorothea Dix, Sarah Parker Remond, and Lucy Stone. Two quotations from each of those women (including Ruffin) are etched on their own marble panel, and the wall behind all the panels has wallpaper made of six government documents repeated over and over, with each document being related to a cause of one or more of the women.

Her home on Charles Street is a site on the Boston Women's Heritage Trail.
