= National Association of Colored Women's Clubs =

American women's organization

National Association of Colored Women's Clubs Emblem

The National Association of Colored Women's Clubs (NACWC) is an American organization that was formed in July 1896 at the First Annual Convention of the National Federation of Afro-American Women in Washington, D.C., United States, by a merger of the National Federation of Afro-American Women, the Woman's Era Club of Boston, and the Colored Women's League of Washington, DC, at the call of Josephine St. Pierre Ruffin. From 1896 to 1904 it was known as the National Association of Colored Women (NACW). It adopted the motto "Lifting as we climb", to demonstrate to "an ignorant and suspicious world that our aims and interests are identical with those of all good aspiring women." When incorporated in 1904, NACW became known as the National Association of Colored Women's Clubs (NACWC).

== History ==
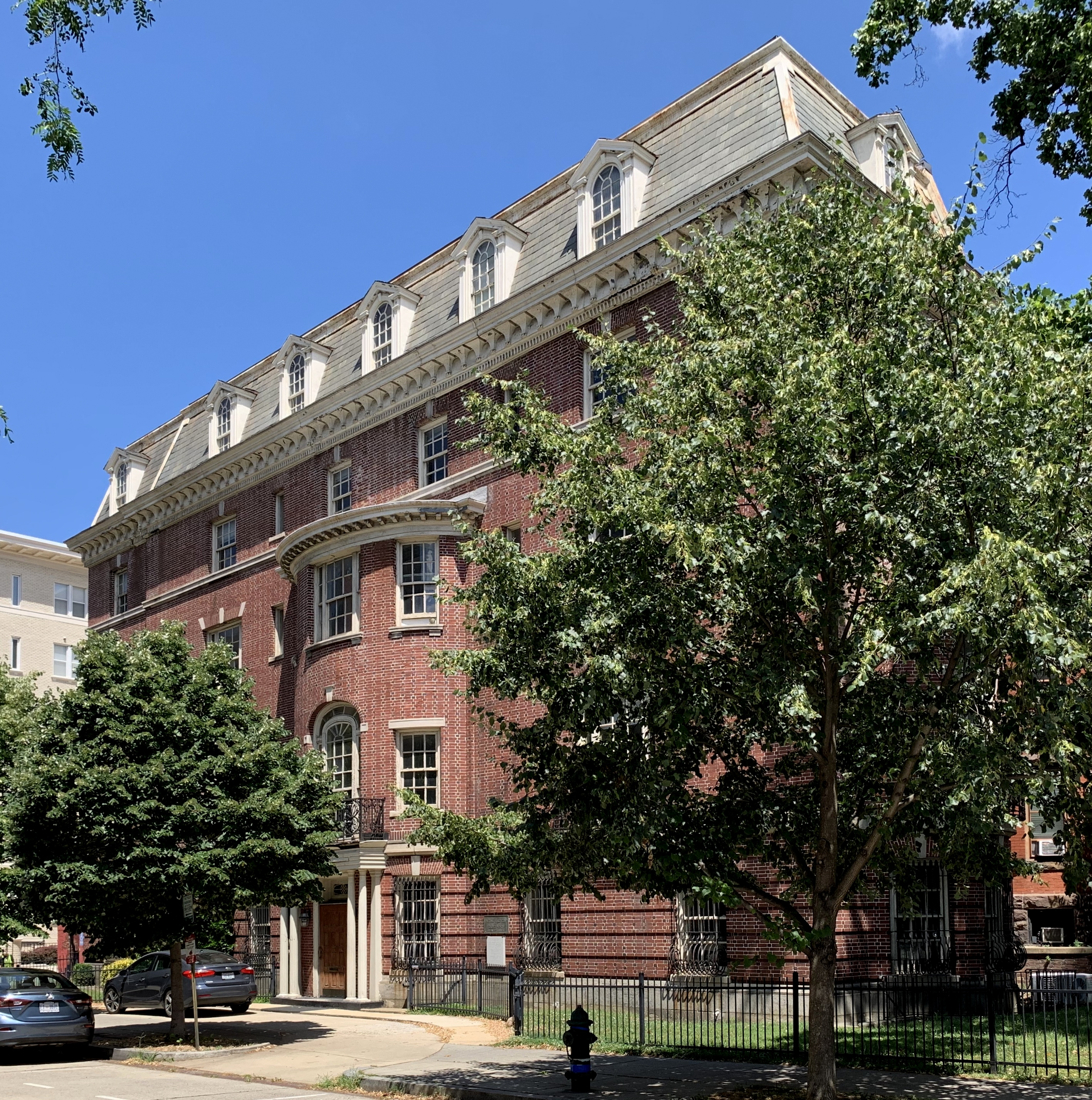
National Association of Colored Women's Clubs headquarters in Washington, D.C., part of the Sixteenth Street Historic District.

The National Association of Colored Women (later National Association of Colored Women's Clubs) was established in Washington, D.C., on July 21, 1896. This first of what would later become biennial convention meetings of the association was held at the Nineteenth Street Baptist Church. The organizations attending this convention included the National Federation of Afro-American Women, the Woman's Era Club of Boston, and the National League of Colored Women of Washington, DC, the Women's Loyal Union as well as smaller organizations that had arisen from the African-American women's club movement. These organizations and later others across the country merged to form the National Association of Colored Women. The organization helped all African-Americans through its work on issues of civil rights and injustice, such as women’s suffrage, lynching, and Jim Crow laws.

=== Foundation ===
Two of NACWC's leading members were Josephine St. Pierre Ruffin and Mary Church Terrell, who organized their regional women's clubs at the July 1896 convention to resist negative representations of Black Women. To defend their respectability, they refuted a letter written by James Jacks, then president of the Missouri Press Association because Jacks' letter referred to them as thieves and prostitutes. Mrs. Booker T. Washington, Margaret Murray Washington, convened the meeting.

Founders of the NACWC included Harriet Tubman, Margaret Murray Washington, Frances E. W. Harper, Ida Bell Wells-Barnett, Victoria Earle Matthews, Josephine Silone Yates, and Mary Church Terrell.

=== Mission ===
The organization defined its first year agenda through multiple issues inhibiting the social mobility of black people. These included: "Chain Gang System of the South, the Separate Car Law of the South, the Plantation Mother and Child, Rescue Work in the Alleys and Slums of our Great Cities, the Founding of Homes for our Working Classes, and a Greater Interest in our Fallen and Wayward."

During the next ten years, the NACWC became involved in campaigns in favor of women's suffrage and against lynching and Jim Crow laws. They also led efforts to improve education, and care for both children and the elderly. Membership grew from 5,000 members in 1897 to 100,000 by 1924 before a decline during the Great Depression.

=== Notable leadership ===
Josephine St. Pierre Ruffin and Mary Church Terrell made major contributions to the National Association of Colored Women. Their efforts led the NACWC to become the most prominent organization formed during the African-American Woman Suffrage Movement.

Both women were educated and had economically successful parents. Josephine St. Pierre Ruffin used part of her estate to fund Woman’s Era, the first journal published by and for African-American women. This publication established black women as a public audience and a community for both NACWC members and prospective members. Mary Church Terrell was a formidable organizer. She led the struggle in Washington, DC against segregation in restaurants and succeeded in winning a court decision for integration there.

=== Officers elected ===
==== Inaugural meeting ====
Officers elected at the first meeting of the National Association of Colored Women, July 1896.

- President - Mrs. Mary Church Terrell
- First Vice President - Mrs. Fanny Jackson Coppin
- Second Vice President - Mrs. F. E. W. Harper
- Third Vice President - Mrs. Josephine St. Pierre Ruffin
- Fourth Vice President - Mrs. Josephine Silone Yates
- Fifth Vice President - Mrs. Sylvanie Williams
- Sixth Vice President - Mrs. Jennie Chase Williams
- Seventh Vice President - Mrs. Lucy Thurman
- Recording Secretary - Mrs. Alice Ruth Moore
- Corresponding Secretary - Miss A. V. Thompkins
- Treasurer - Mrs. Helen Appo Cook
- Chairman of the Executive Committee - Mrs. Margaret Murray Washington
- National Organizer - Mrs. Victoria Earle Matthews
- Editorial Staff - Margaret Murray Washington, Dr. Rebecca Cole, Mrs. Rosa D. Bowser, Mrs. Ida Wells-Barnett, Mrs. Frances J. Jackson
- Ways and Means Committee - Mrs. J. Napier Kemp, Miss Lulu Chase, Mrs. Ella Mahammitt, Miss Julia F. Jones
- Committee to Draft Constitution - Mrs. A. V. Jones, Mrs. Anna Jones, Mrs. C. L. Franklin, Mrs. Rosa D. Bowser, and Mrs. Victoria Earle Matthews
- Other significant attendees - Mrs. John H. Smyth

== NACWC objectives ==
1. To work for the economic, moral, religious and social welfare of women and children.
2. To protect the rights of women and children.
3. To raise the standard and quality of life in home and family.
4. To secure and use our influence for the enforcement of civil and political rights for all citizens.
5. To promote the education of women and children through the work of effective programs.
6. To obtain for African-American families the opportunity of reaching the highest levels of human endeavor.
7. To promote effective interaction with the organization's male auxiliary.
8. To promote inter-racial understanding so that justice and good will may prevail amongst all people.

== Presidents ==
- Mary Church Terrell – 1st President (1896–1900)
- Josephine Silone Yates – 2nd President (1900–1904)
- Lucy Thurman – 3rd President (1904–1908)
- Elizabeth Carter Brooks – 4th President (1908–1912)
- Margaret Murray Washington – 5th President (1912–1916)
- Mary B. Talbert – 6th President (1916–1920)
- Miss Hallie Q. Brown – 7th President (1920–1924)
- Mary McLeod Bethune – 8th President (1924–1928)
- Mrs. Sallie Wyatt Stewart – 9th President (1928–1933)
- Dr. Mary Fitzbutler Waring – 10th President (1933–1937)
- Mrs. Jennie B. Moton – 11th President (1937–1941)
- Mrs. Ada Belle Dement – 12th President (1941–1945)
- Mrs. Christine S. Smith – 13th President (1946–1948)
- Ella P. Stewart – 14th President (1948–1952)
- Irene McCoy Gaines – 15th President (1952–1958)

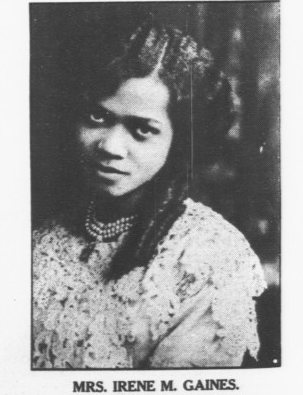
Irene M. Gaines, 15th President

- Dr Rosa L. Gragg - 16th President (1958–1964)
- Mamie B. Reese - 17th President (1964–1968)
- Myrtle Ollison - 18th President (1968–1972)
- Juanita W. Brown - 19th President (1972–1976)
- Inez W. Tinsley - 20th President (1976–1980)
- Otelia Champion - 21st President (1980–1984)
- Myrtle E. Gray - 22nd President (1984–1988)
- Dr. Dolores M. Harris - 23rd President (1988–1992)
- Savannah C. Jones - 24th President (1992–1996)
- Dr. Patricia L. Fletcher - 25th President (1996–2002)
- Margaret J. Cooper - 26th President (2002–2006)
- Dr. Marie Wright Tolliver - 27th President (2006–2010)
- Evelyn Rising - 28th President (2010–2014)
- Sharon R. Bridgeforth - 29th President (2014–2018)
- Dr. Andrea Brooks-Smith - 30th President (2018–2022)
- Opal Bacon - 31st President (2022–2024)
- Denise E. Williams - 32nd President (2024-

== Conventions ==
- 1st, 1897, Nashville, Tennessee
- 2nd, 1899, Chicago, Illinois
- 3rd, 1901, Buffalo, New York
- 4th, 1904, St. Louis, Missouri
- 5th, 1906, Detroit, Michigan
- 6th, 1908, Brooklyn, New York
- 7th, 1910, Louisville, Kentucky
- 8th, 1912, Hampton, Virginia
- 9th, 1914, Wilberforce, Ohio
- 10th, 1916, Baltimore, Maryland
- 11th, 1918, Denver, Colorado
- 12th, 1920, Tuskegee, Alabama
- 13th, 1922, Richmond, Virginia
- 14th, 1924, Chicago, Illinois
- 15th, 1926, Oakland, California
- 16th, 1928, Washington, D. C.
- 17th, 1930, Hot Springs, Arkansas
- 18th, 1933, Chicago, Illinois
- 19th, 1935, Cleveland, Ohio
- 20th, 1937, Fort Worth, Texas
- 21st, 1939, Boston, Massachusetts
- 22nd, 1941, Oklahoma City, Oklahoma
- 23rd, 1946, Washington, D. C.
- 24th, 1948, Seattle, Washington
- 25th, 1950, Atlantic City, New Jersey
- 26th, 1952, Los Angeles, California
- 27th, 1954, Washington, D. C.
- 28th, 1956, Miami, Florida
- 29th, 1958, Detroit, Michigan
- 30th, 1960, New York, New York
- 31st, 1962, Washington, D. C.
- 32nd, 1964, Denver, Colorado
- 33rd, 1966, Oklahoma City, Oklahoma
- 34th, 1968, Chicago, Illinois
- 35th, 1970, Atlantic City, New Jersey
- 36th, 1972, San Jose, California
- 37th, 1974, Atlanta, Georgia
- 38th, 1976, Pittsburgh, Pennsylvania
- 39th, 1978, Seattle, Washington
- 40th, 1980, Washington, D. C.
- 41st, 1982, Anchorage, Arkansas
- 42nd, 1984, Norfolk, Virginia
- 48th, 1986, Austin, Texas
- 49th, 1988, Orlando, Florida
- 50th, 1990, Cleveland, Ohio
- 51st, 1992, Portland, Oregon

== Notable affiliates ==
- California State Federation of Colored Women's Clubs
- Empire State Federation of Women's Clubs
- Indiana State Federation of Colored Women's Clubs
- Iowa Federation of Colored Women's Clubs
- Mississippi State Federation of Colored Women’s Clubs
- Northeastern Federation of Colored Women's Clubs
- Oklahoma Federation of Colored Women's Clubs
- South Carolina Federation of Colored Women's Clubs
- Texas Association of Women's Clubs

== See also ==
- African-American women's suffrage movement
- Black feminism
- The First National Conference of the Colored Women of America
