= Vera Virginia Wesley Greene =

African-American suffragist (1890–1983)

Vera Virginia Wesley Green
- Born: January 26, 1890; Missouri, United States
- Died: April 1983 (aged 92–93); Chicago, Illinois, United States
- Known for: Suffragist

Vera Virginia Wesley Greene (January 26, 1890 – April 1983) was an African-American suffragist and member of the Alpha Suffrage Club. Born in Missouri in the United States, she later moved to Chicago, Illinois.

== Life ==
Vera Virginia Wesley Greene was born on the January 26, 1890, in Sedalia Township, Pettis County, Missouri. She lived with her parents Ellen and John Wesley, a day labourer, and her sister Sallie. By 1910, Wesley Greene, her sister and her brother-in-law John Thomas had moved to Chicago, where she was working as a manicurist.

On August 12, 1913, Wesley Greene married James A. Greene in Chicago. Greene was working in Chicago as a postal clerk at the time. On October 4, 1915, their only child, daughter Beverly Lorraine, was born in Chicago. By 1930 Wesley Greene was divorced and worked as a maid for the railroad. She and her daughter continued to live in Chicago for the rest of their lives.

Wesley Greene never remarried and died in April 1983 in Chicago. Beverly, her daughter, was educated at the University of Illinois and became one of the first African-American women licensed as an architect. Beverly also never married and died in 1957, at the age of 41. Vera Greene's ex-husband James A. Greene remarried and died in 1959.

The first Alpha Suffrage Record, published March 18, 1914.

== Suffrage work ==
Wesley Greene was recording secretary for the Alpha Suffrage Club, which was organized by Ida B. Wells-Barnett and established in Chicago in 1913. Wesley Green wrote resolutions honoring the work accomplished by Congressman Martin B. Madden for protecting the rights of African Americans. She also wrote a piece that asserted that the club supported Oscar De Priest as the first black alderman on the Chicago City Council. Both short compositions were published in the first issue of the Alpha Suffrage Record published in March 1914. On March 6, 1915, The Broad Ax newspaper published Greene's report on the City Federation of Colored Women's Clubs' meeting at the Herman Baptist Church in Chicago.

The Alpha Suffrage Club was an autonomous organisation which was concerned with educating black women in civic affairs and advancing women's opportunities in municipal reform. It was particularly active in registering black women to vote after the Illinois state legislature approved municipal and presidential voting for women in 1913. The elections in 1914 and 1915 meant that club members wanted to get out the black vote and focus the vote on electing a "race man" to represent the Second Ward in Chicago politics. Historians generally credit the work of the Club as crucial in the 1915 election of Oscar DePriest as the first black alderman in Chicago.

== See also ==
- African-American women's suffrage movement
- Alpha Suffrage Club
