= Viola Hill =

American suffragist, community leader, and musician

Viola Hill (1892 – 1954) was an African-American suffragist, activist, and musician. She was a founding member of the Alpha Suffrage Club and a community leader within the African Methodist Episcopal Church.

== Childhood and early activism ==
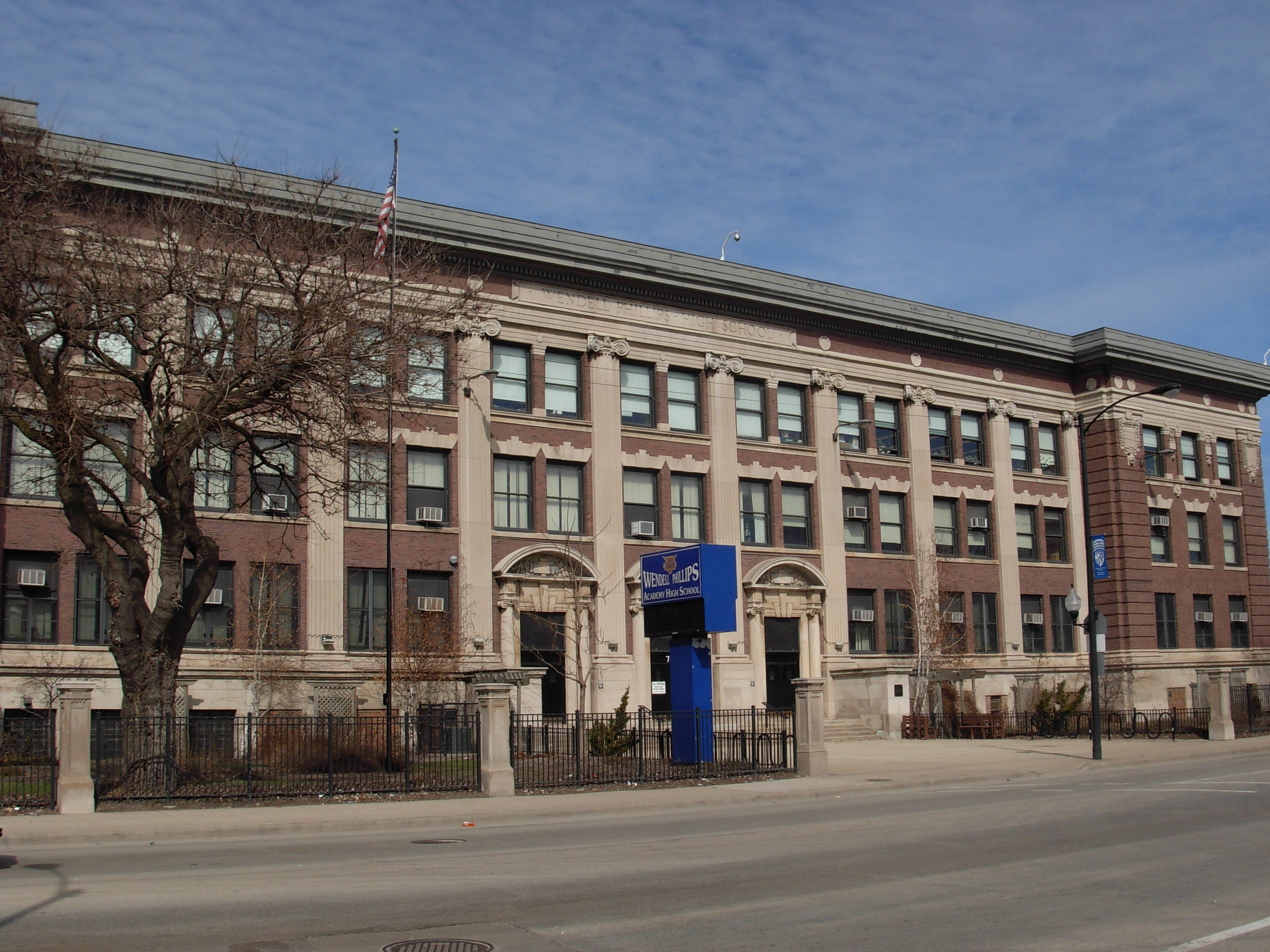
Wendell Phillips High School in 2010

Viola Hill was born in September 1892 to Mattie Hill, a laundress, and Carey J. Hill, a day laborer. She spent her young childhood in Athens, Georgia. Some time after the 1900 census, the family moved to Chicago. Many Black people moved to northern cities in the early and mid-1900s as a result of widespread racist violence, segregation, and economic insecurity in the South. (Note: The mass migration of Black Americans northward is generally referred to as the Great Migration. Hill's family moved before the Great Migration, which technically began around 1916.)

In 1910, Hill graduated from Wendell Phillips High School in the Bronzeville neighborhood. Wendell Phillips was Chicago's first predominantly Black high school.

From 1911, the year after Hill's high school graduation, there is evidence of her activism. That year, she played piano at a Negro Fellowship League event. The Negro Fellowship League, founded by Ida B. Wells in 1910, was a community organization which aimed to unite Black Chicagoans at a time when other organizations, such as the YMCA, didn't accept Black members. Its main goal was to help new arrivals from the American South during the Great Migration.

As a young woman, Viola Hill also hosted social clubs within her own home on south Dearborn Street in Chicago.

== Women's suffrage ==
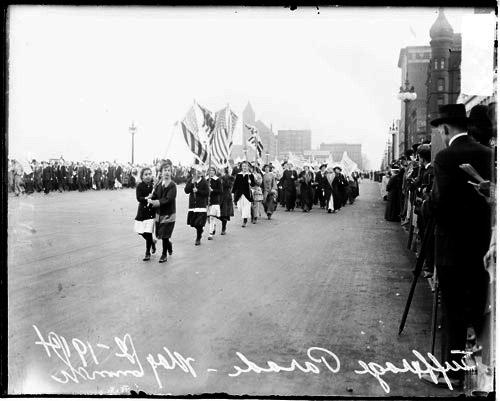
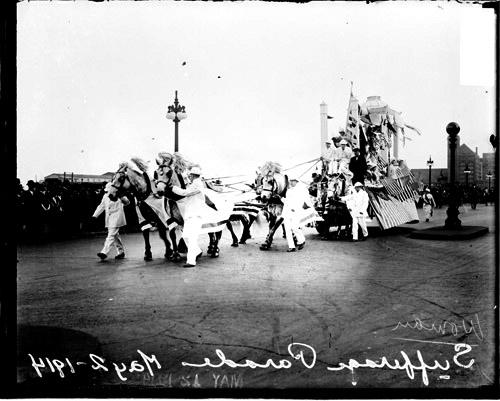
Photographs of the May 1914 suffrage parade in Chicago

In 1913, Hill gave a speech before the Alpha Suffrage Club, the first Black women's suffrage club in Illinois. She served as the club's second vice president. (Note: Hill wasn't the second person to serve as vice president; instead, she held a rank subordinate to vice president Mary E. Jackson.) She was among the club's first officers; others included Ida B. Wells, Mary E. Jackson, Vera Wesley Green, Sadie Lewis Adams, Laura Beasley, and K. J. Bills.

The Alpha Suffrage Club, or ASC, was an influential club from its inception in 1913. It sent Ida B. Wells to a national parade, the 1913 Woman Suffrage Procession. It published the Alpha Suffrage Record in 1914 and 1915 to educate the community about local issues and candidates that would show up on the ballot.

Illinois women could vote in local elections as of 1914; Black suffragists like Viola Hill "went to work immediately." Besides publishing the Alpha Suffrage Record, the clubwomen canvassed local neighborhoods to recruit voters. They also attended suffrage parades. For example, Black women had a significant presence at the May 1914 suffrage parade in Chicago. Viola Hill wrote about the demonstration for The Chicago Defender, an African-American newspaper circulating in Chicago since 1905. This was one of multiple articles she wrote for The Defender.

In her role as second vice president of the ASC, Hill organized and presented at community events. Various speakers came to ASC meetings to address the clubwomen and larger community; speakers included activists such as Jane Addams and political candidates seeking votes.

Hill also contributed to the election of Chicago's first Black alderman, Oscar Stanton De Priest. In 1914, De Priest was nominated as the first Black candidate for the 2nd ward. He largely credited the ASC for his election.

== Work in the AME Church ==
Viola Hill held various leadership positions within the AME Church. Hill was an active leader in the church during a period of broad social change for women: in the late 19th and early 20th century, while women were struggling for the right to vote, AME women also sought leadership and service within the church.

In 1914, Viola Hill was a secretary for the Allen Christian Endeavor League of the Chicago District. That June, she helped organize a fundraiser for the League. In 1918, she was elected treasurer. The League was an AME organization which aimed to promote "practical Christian living" and charity work among young people in the church.

In 1915, Hill served as district vice president for the Hyde Park AME Church, a small Chicago church which, contrary to its name, is not in the Hyde Park neighborhood. It lies, however, within the former Hyde Park Township, annexed by Chicago in 1889.

Hill worked at St. Mary's AME Church from 1914 to 1916. She was the assistant superintendent of its Sunday school and often led classes. She also organized and spoke at church events, such as banquets.

In 1916, Hill wrote an article for The Chicago Defender about a local Sunday school convention; teachers, pastors, and others involved in Chicago's AME Church Sunday schools gathered to discuss education. They met at the Arnett Chapel AME Church in the Morgan Park neighborhood of Chicago.

In the 1930s, Viola Hill ran the choir for the Carey Temple AME Church, a large church in Chicago just south of 71st Street.

== Later life ==
Viola Hill led community choirs through the 1920s, 1930s, and 1940s. She also worked as the vocal director for The Swing Mikado (1938), a swing version of The Mikado, a comic opera. The production was part of the Federal Theatre Project, a program established during the Great Depression to fund the arts. The cast of this Mikado was all-Black.

Hill later served on the advisory board for the National Association of Negro Musicians (NANM). The NANM, founded 1919 in Chicago, aims to promote interest in Black music and unite Black musicians. It holds annual concerts, workshops, conventions, and so on in various cities across the United States.

She remained in Chicago for the rest of her life; she is recorded as a Chicago resident in census data from 1910 to 1940.

Viola Hill never married and did not have children. She died June 25, 1954 at her home on South Ridgeway Avenue in Chicago. She is buried in Burr Oak Cemetery in Alsip.
