= Estelle Hall Young =

Baltimore leader of the African-American women's suffrage movement

- Born: 1884; Georgia
- Died: August 1938 (aged 53–54); Baltimore, Maryland
- Occupations: Civil rights activist and suffragist
- Spouse: Dr. Howard E. Young
- Children: N. Louise Young

Estelle Hall Young (1884-1938) was a leader of the African-American women's suffrage movement in Baltimore, Maryland. She founded the Colored Women's Suffrage Club and worked tirelessly to support suffrage for African-American people.

== Biography ==
Estelle Hall was born in Georgia in 1884. She studied to be a teacher at Spelman College and Atlanta University. She studied under W.E.B. DuBois at Spelman. She taught in Atlanta until she moved to Baltimore in 1905.

In Baltimore, she married Dr. Howard E. Young, the first Black owner-and-operator of a pharmacy. They had three children together: two sons and one daughter. Their daughter N. Louise Young became the first Black woman licensed to practice medicine in Maryland.

== Suffrage activism ==
Young established a Colored Women's Suffrage Club in West Baltimore and became its first president in 1915. The organization was also called the Progressive Suffrage Club. The club eventually outgrew the living rooms where they were held, and they moved to the Colored Y.W.C.A. on Druid Hill Avenue.

After the adoption of the 19th Amendment, Young rallied Black women in Maryland to send a message to legislators who tried to defeat the legislation, because it would increase the pool of Black voters. She continued to hold voter education classes at the Y.W.C.A. to help new voters access and use their right.

She organized new chapters, including one in Montgomery County, and led weekly meetings to help women register and vote. She worked with local churches to spend five minutes at the beginning of Sunday services to speak about voter registration, and her efforts made a difference. Unlike white women voters who left civil rights work after the passage of the 19th amendment, Young and her community continued.

Young and her husband tested housing segregation laws in Baltimore in 1913. They purchased a house in a white neighborhood, and asked the Black community to help them pay the fines from the city's housing segregation laws. They did not receive the financial support and rented the house to a white family.

Young was an active part of the DuBois Circle in Baltimore and hosted meetings at her home. Members of the DuBois Circle were prominent Black women that discussed Black literature and history, and they voiced their support for women's suffrage. Since Young was a student of DuBois at Spelman College, she arranged for him to visit the Circle.

Young was asked to speak at the Sharp Street Methodist Episcopal Church at a Women's Day event in 1918.

She was active in the 1920s and 1930s in the Republican party, and lobbied her senators to support anti-lynching legislation.

In the 1930s, Young was given an award from NAACP's Maryland State Conference of Branches.

== Death and legacy ==
Young died in August 1938 in Baltimore. She is buried at Mt. Auburn Cemetery, alongside her husband and daughter.

== See also ==
- African-American women's suffrage movement
- Black suffrage in the United States
- History of African Americans in Baltimore
- Housing segregation in the United States
