= Virginia Brooks =

American suffragist (1886–1929)

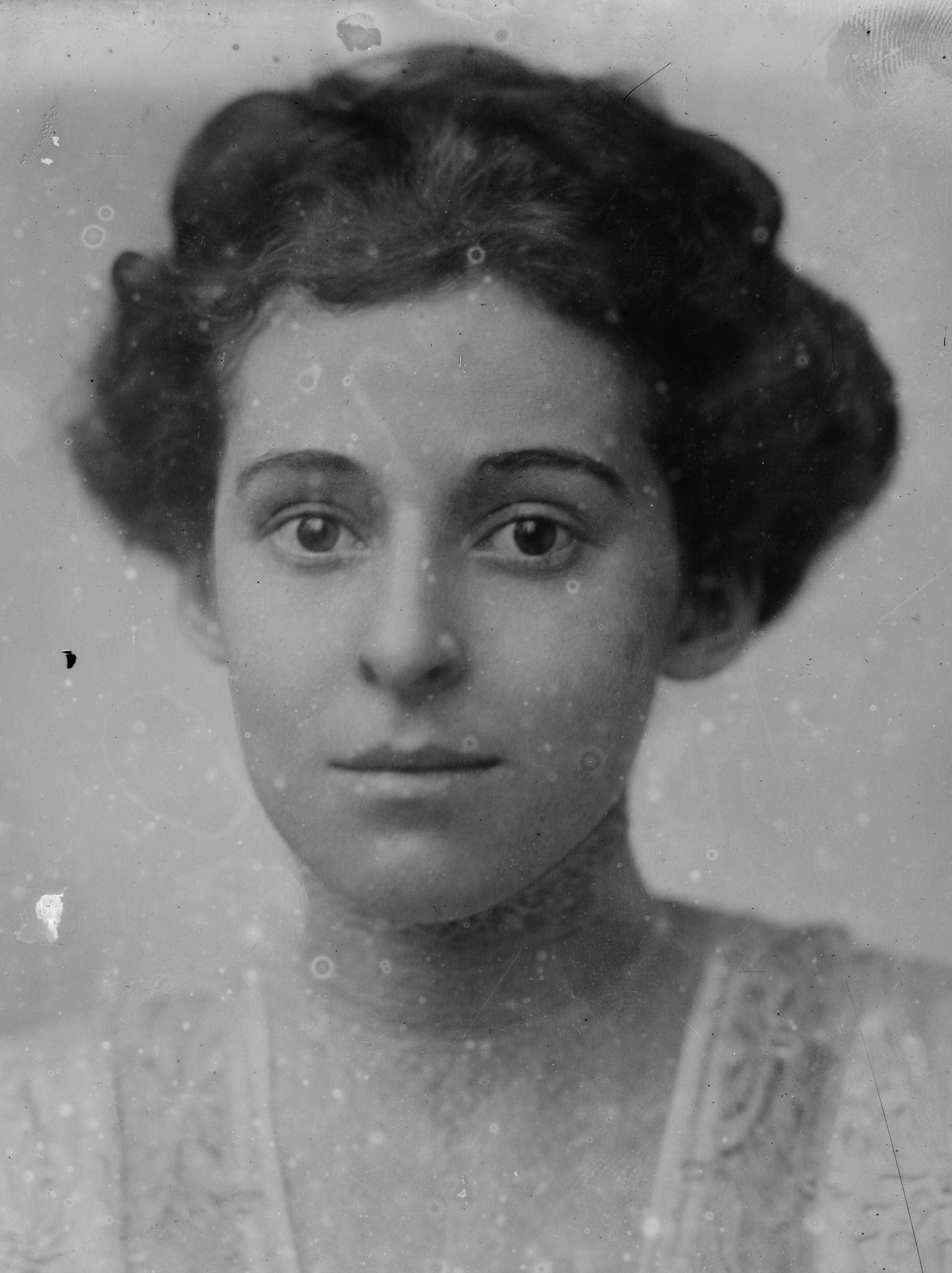
- Brooks in 1909 or 1910
- Born: January 11, 1886; Chicago, Illinois, US
- Died: June 15, 1929 (aged 43); Portland, Oregon, US
- Resting place: Wilhelm’s Portland Memorial
- Other name: Virginia Washburne
- Occupations: Political activist, suffragist, author
- Notable work: My Battles with Vice and Little Lost Sister both books by Brooks
- Movement: Women's Suffrage
- Spouse: Charles Shephard Washbune (m. 1913)
- Children: Walter Washburne

Virginia Brooks (January 11, 1886 – June 15, 1929) was an American suffragist and political reformer who worked in the Chicago region and throughout Indiana in the early 1900s. She was born to parents who moved from Ohio to Chicago. Brooks penned two books, Little Lost Sister (1914) and My Battles with Vice (1915).

== Early life ==
Brooks was born on January 11, 1886, in the Hyde Park neighborhood of Chicago, IL, to Oliver H. Brooks and Flora P. Brooks. Her parents owned boarding houses in the neighborhood. She married Charles Shephard Washburne on April 3, 1913. The couple had one child, a son named Walter Washburne.

== Activism ==
A photograph of Brooks published in a 1913 brochure.

=== Chicago, Illinois ===
Brooks spent time in Chicago throughout the 1910s working with different groups and political reformers. Brooks had a close relationship with Ida B. Wells, a suffragist, journalist, feminist, and prominent leader in Civil Rights Movement. Wells met Virginia Brooks in Chicago. In 1913 Brooks, with the help of Belle Squire, worked with Wells to create the Alpha Suffrage Club (ASC), a group that worked to get African-American women involved in the suffrage movement. The first goal of the ASC was to raise enough money to send Wells to Washington, D.C. to participate in a suffrage march on behalf of the club. The leader of the delegation from Illinois, Grace Trout, told Wells that she was not allowed to march with the white women of the state but could form a delegation of black women if she wanted. Brooks stood by her side by saying "...to exclude Ms. Wells on the basis of race of would be undemocratic." Brooks and Squire volunteered to walk with their friend Wells in the black section of the march but on the day of the march, she was nowhere to be found. Brooks and Squire returned to the Illinois women's section worried about Wells' whereabouts. As the march began, Wells came out of the crowd to stand beside Brooks and Squire with the suffragists of Illinois.

=== West Hammond, Illinois ===
Brooks moved to West Hammond, Illinois, with her mother after inheriting land valued at about $39,000 from her father. West Hammond was a village on the border of Illinois and Indiana (now part of Calumet City as of 1923), just south of Chicago. She noticed that the village was filled with a heavy immigrant population that was being taken advantage of by the village government. She worked to improve the living conditions of the village by working on behalf of those that could not work for themselves. She campaigned against the vice culture of West Hammond and attacked tavern owners, who ruled the village. Brooks was famously known as the "Joan of Arc" of West Hammond for her efforts. One of her first moves in political activism was the campaign she held against the transition of the status of West Hammond from a village to a city in 1911. Brooks believed that the village needed to be clean of vice and corruption before it should be upgraded to a new style of government. She single-handedly tracked down the corrupt tavern-owners that were running the town and began her reform. Her slogan for reform was: "Vote for a village. You can’t make an honest city out a dishonest village while the ring is in power. Clean up first." The campaign was ultimately unsuccessful but the village became a shrine to her reform work as she worked day after day to make positive change. She ran for her first public office position in 1912 as president of the West Hammond Board of Education district 156 (otherwise known as the Sobieski district. She won the election on April 22, 1912.

=== Indiana ===
Brooks spoke across Indiana at different functions. In 1912, she was a principal speaker at the Equal Suffrage League in Indianapolis. Also in 1912, she spoke about her crusade for reform in Richmond, Indiana

== Late life and death ==
In her late life, Brooks traveled west towards Portland, Oregon with her son, Walter, who was known as Brooks. She died on June 15, 1929, in Portland under her married name of Virginia Washburne and her remains lie at Wilhelm’s Portland Memorial cemetery.
