= Millie Lawson Bethell Paxton =

American civic leader

Millie Lawson Bethell Paxton (February 2, 1875 – July 2, 1939) was an American civic leader, political activist, and suffragist from Virginia.

== Early life, education, and career ==
Millie Paxton was born on February 2, 1875, in Pittsylvania County, Virginia, United States to Alice Lawson. Her recorded father, possibly her stepfather, was Clinton Bethell. She attended the Virginia Seminary and graduated from the Hampton Normal and Agricultural Institute in 1895. She married William H. Paxton on December 25, 1895, and they had two sons and one daughter. Her husband died on October 6, 1901. After the death of her husband, Paxton worked various domestic jobs, and her primary employment was as a truant officer for the Roanoke African-American schools.

== Civic leadership and political activism ==
By 1905, Paxton had organized local chapters of the Independent Order of Calanthe, which were women's organizations affiliated with the Knights of Pythias. She was also vice president of the Missionary Society at the Roanoke First Baptist Church. For several years, Paxton served as president of the auxiliary at the segregated Burrell Memorial Hospital for African Americans. She was also the first president of the Ideal Garden Club.

After World War I, she served as the chair of the Roanoke chapter of the Better Homes in America organization. Paxton also helped organize the Phyllis Wheatley branch of the Young Women's Christian Association, and served as chair of the House Committee after the formal launch in 1923. She was also a charter member of the Virginia affiliate organization of the National Association of Colored Women's Clubs and served as chair of the Ways and Means Committee.

Paxton was the president of the Colored Women's Voting Club in Roanoke, which by November 2, 1920, after the ratification of the Nineteenth Amendment to the United States Constitution, reported registering 655 Black women to vote.

Paxton's eldest son, William Herman Paxton, was killed in France during World War I, and Paxton served as the president of the post auxiliary of The Herman Paxton Post No. 161 (Colored) of the American Legion after it was formed in 1933.

In 1934 and 1935, Paxton led successful membership drives for the National Association for the Advancement of Colored People (NAACP). In 1936, Paxton served on a local NAACP fundraising committee in support of the falsely accused Scottsboro Boys.

== Later life and legacy ==
In her later life, Paxton experienced chronic hepatitis and arteriosclerosis, and died on July 2, 1939, in Roanoke. She was buried at Lincoln Burial Park.

After she died, she was described in a Virginia newspaper as "one of Roanoke's most widely known and beloved colored citizens," who was active "in all phases of civic and religious work."

== See also ==
- Women's suffrage in Virginia
- African-American women's suffrage movement
