= Mary E. Jackson =

American activist with the African-American women's suffrage movement (1867–1923)

Mary Elizabeth Jackson
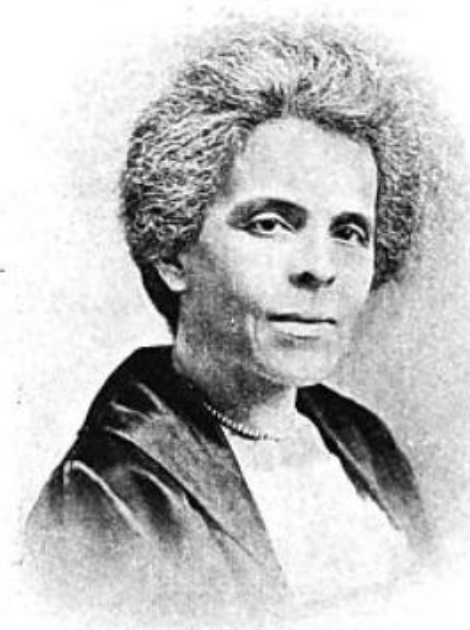
- Mary E. Jackson from a 1918 publication of the YWCA
- Born: 1867; Providence, Rhode Island, U.S.
- Died: 1923 (aged 55–56)
- Known for: Activism with the African-American women's suffrage movement

Mary Elizabeth Jackson (1867–1923), was an African-American female suffrage activist, YWCA leader and writer. She worked with the Northeast Federation of Colored Women's Club and lead the suffrage movement with the National Association of Colored Women.

== History ==
Mary Elizabeth Jackson was born 1867 in Providence, Rhode Island to Henry and Amelia Jackson. She was a member of the Pond Street Baptist Church and founding member of the Providence NAACP.

Jackson worked as a civil service employee, working at the Labor Department of the State of Rhode Island. In 1917, during World War I, she was appointed as "Special Industrial Worker among Colored Women" for the National War Work Council of the YMCA in which she analyzed employment trends and recommended programs to encourage fair employment of women of color. Between 1918 and 1921 she served as the YWCA's Industrial Secretary for Colored Work. In this role, she sought to provide good industrial jobs for Black women and foster interracial cooperation for social and racial justice movements at the time.

Jackson served as president of the Rhode Island State Federation of Colored Women's Club (also known as the Rhode Island Association of Colored Women's Clubs) for 8 years. She served as the first vice president of the Alpha Suffrage Club.

== Writing ==
Jackson wrote for the NAACP’s magazine The Crisis in November 1918 entitled, “The Colored Woman in Industry” which was detailing the working conditions of women in factories and a hopeful future of African-American women in industry. In this writing she describes discusses inequality of wages between races, and between genders, as well as the prejudices and poor working conditions.
