= Black suffrage in the United States =

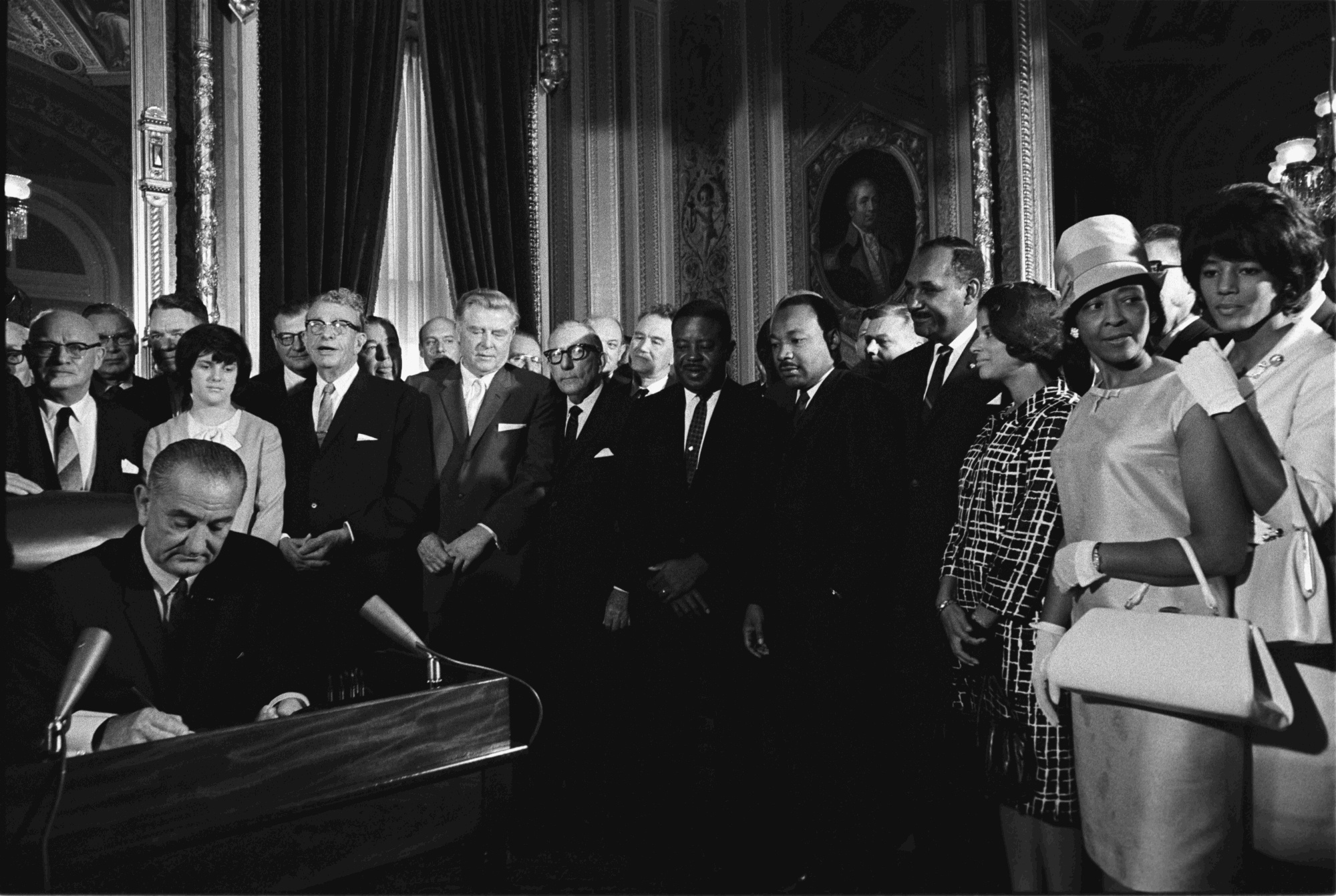
Lyndon B. Johnson signs the Voting Rights Act of 1965

African Americans were fully enfranchised in practice throughout the United States by the Voting Rights Act of 1965. Prior to the Civil War and the Reconstruction Amendments to the U.S. Constitution, some Black people in the United States had the right to vote, but this right was often abridged or taken away. After 1870, Black men were theoretically equal before the law, but in the period between the end of Reconstruction era and the passage of the Civil Rights Act of 1964 this was frequently infringed in practice.

== History ==
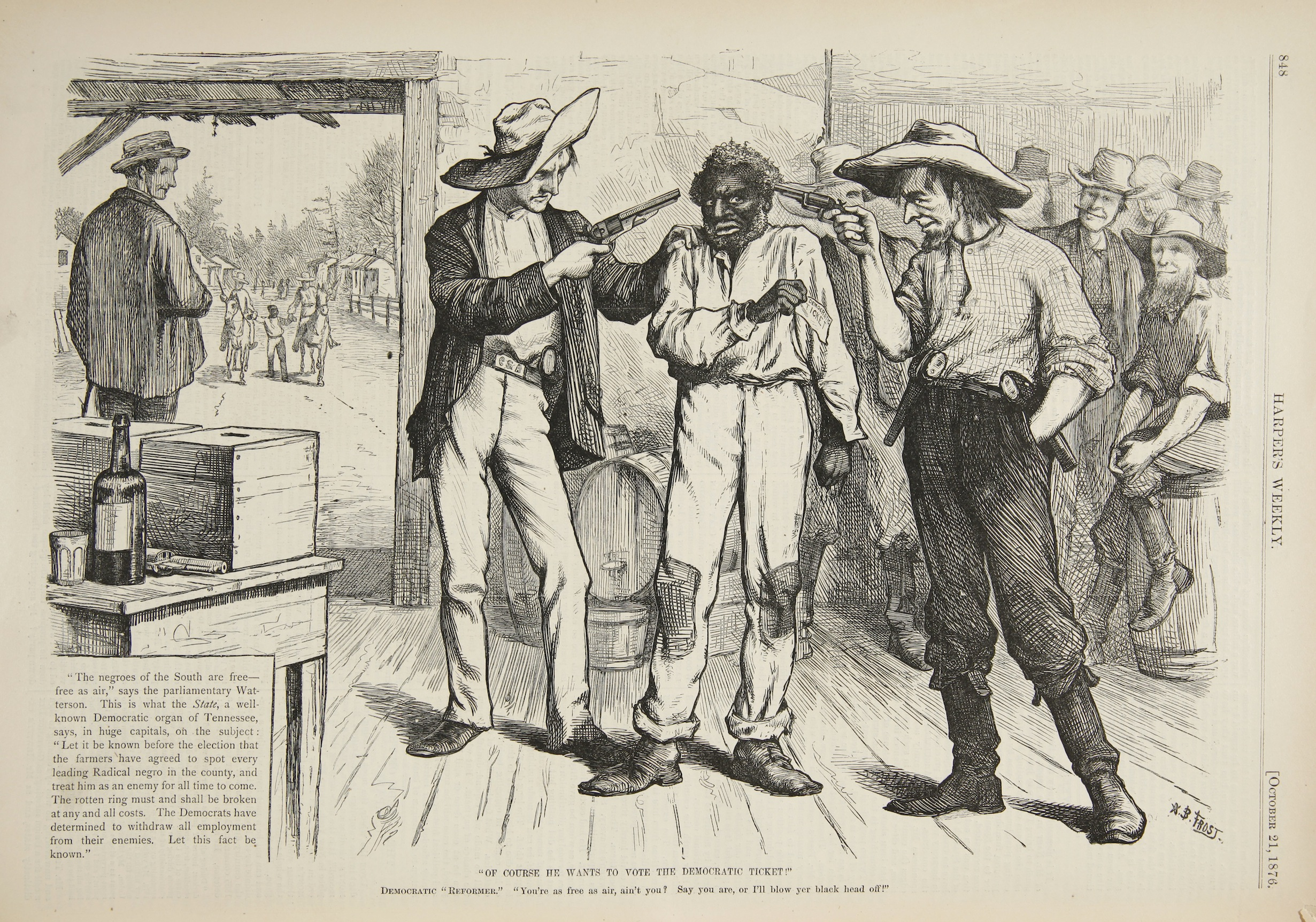
1876 cartoon illustrating intimidation of black voters

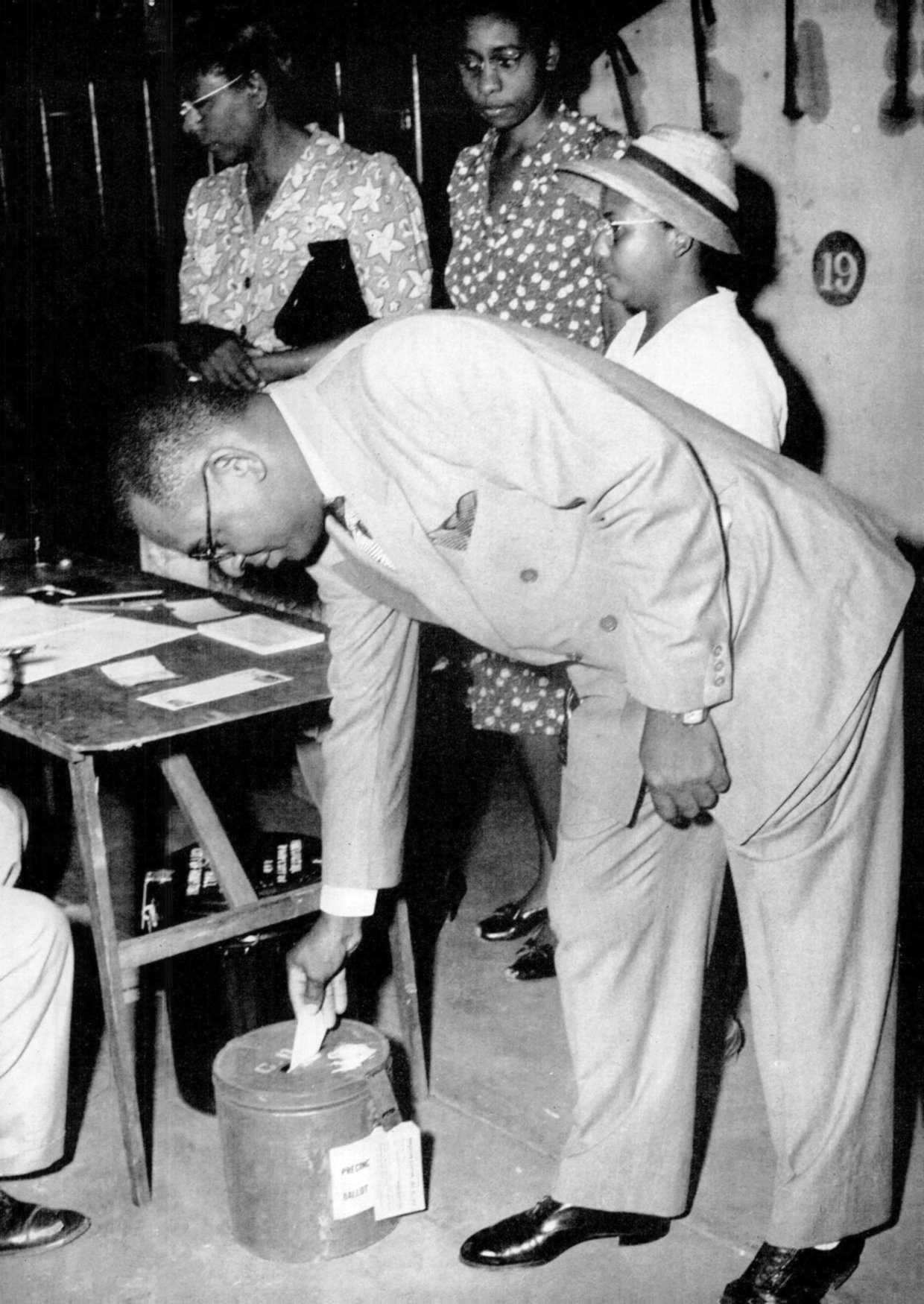
Houston dentist Lonnie E. Smith, plaintiff in the landmark Supreme Court case Smith v. Allwright, casts his ballot in the 1944 Texas Democratic primary election (July 22, 1944).

At the founding of the country, the right to vote was restricted to "gentlemen of property and standing"; most Black people did not own enough property to vote. Removal of the property requirements, so as to enfranchise poor whites, meant that Black people would be able to vote too, so the search began for other means to disenfranchise them. Early legal acts, like the Naturalization Act of 1790, granted naturalized citizenship to "free white person[s]...of good character", thus excluding slaves, free Black people, Native Americans, indentured servants, and Asians. However, states were allowed to grant voting rights at the state level. Prior to the Civil War, free Black people had suffrage in New York, New Jersey, and Pennsylvania. However, the right to vote was rescinded in New Jersey (1807) and Pennsylvania (1838). New York State's Constitution of 1821 imposed a heavy property ownership requirement on Black voters (only), in effect disenfranchising almost all of them.

During this time, abolitionists sought to end slavery, and the call for suffrage grew. The 1857 Dred Scott decision held that persons of African heritage were not U.S. citizens. Rather than settling the issue, as President Buchanan hoped, it produced outrage and is a major item among the causes of the Civil War.

After the Civil War, the Fifteenth Amendment gave all males the vote, but in practice Black people still faced obstacles. Some of the "Black Codes" passed shortly after the legal abolition of slavery explicitly prevented Black people from voting. The Enforcement Acts increased federal penalties for voter intimidation, particularly by white terrorist groups such as the Ku Klux Klan.

Black people seeking suffrage were often met with violence and disenfranchisement after the Reconstruction Era ended and there were no longer federal troops enforcing Negro rights in the states of the former Confederacy. The 1873 Colfax massacre occurred when white locals fought with Black people and federal troops over black voting in Grant Parish, Louisiana. In United States v. Cruikshank (1876), the U.S. Supreme Court invalidated some of the Enforcement Acts, ruling that the federal government could only intervene to prevent discrimination by state actors. In United States v. Reese (1876), the Court upheld voting requirements, such as literacy tests, which do not explicitly discriminate on the basis of race. Jim Crow laws enforcing legal racial segregation at the state and local level in the Southern United States were enacted in the late 19th and early 20th centuries by white Democratic-dominated state legislatures to disenfranchise and remove political and economic gains made by Black people during the Reconstruction Era.

Black people continuously worked towards overcoming these barriers. A group of black activists formed the Niagara Movement in 1905, rebuking the 1895 Atlanta Compromise of Booker T. Washington and issuing a declaration that demanded universal male suffrage. From the Niagara Movement came the National Association for the Advancement of Colored People, formed in 1910, which pursued voting rights mostly through the courts. In Guinn v. United States (1915), the Supreme Court struck down a grandfather clause that functionally exempted only white people from literacy tests. The Court ruled against white primaries in Nixon v. Herndon (1927) and Nixon v. Condon (1932), upheld white primaries in Grovey v. Townsend (1935), and finally banned them with Smith v. Allwright (1944) and Terry v. Adams (1953). In Breedlove v. Suttles (1937), The Court upheld the constitutionality of a poll tax requirement for voting.

The Civil Rights Movement brought renewed attention to black voting rights. Florida voting rights activists Harriette Moore and Harry T. Moore were assassinated by the KKK in 1951. In Gomillion v. Lightfoot (1960) the Supreme Court struck down a plan to redraw the district lines of Tuskegee, Alabama, on the grounds that it would disenfranchise black voters. The Twenty-fourth Amendment to the United States Constitution, passed in 1962–1964, banned poll taxes as a precondition for voting in federal elections. The Supreme Court ruled against state poll taxes in 1966 in Harper v. Virginia State Board of Elections. Civil rights leaders began organized campaigns to register black voters, including the federally endorsed Voter Education Project. A particularly intense voting rights struggle in Mississippi led to the death of Medgar Evers in 1963 and of three civil rights volunteers during the Freedom Summer campaign in 1964. Organizers also created the Mississippi Freedom Democratic Party to challenge the white-dominated Mississippi Democratic Party. In Alabama, the highly publicized Selma to Montgomery marches in 1965 met with a violent response, bringing more scrutiny to suppression of black voters. The Voting Rights Act of 1965 prohibited a variety of discriminatory state voting practices. The Supreme Court upheld this law in the 1966 decision South Carolina v. Katzenbach.

Since the 1960s, the practice of gerrymandering—drawing the boundaries of each Congressional district, which are redone after every census, so as to maximize white and minimize Black political power—has been identified as a threat to black voting rights in the U.S. The Supreme Court limited the Gomillion decision in Mobile v. Bolden (1980), distinguishing between racist effects and racist intent, and prohibiting only the latter. The Court ruled in Shaw v. Reno (1993) that if a redistricting plan is "so bizarre on its face that it is 'unexplainable on grounds other than race'", it must be held to a "strict scrutiny" standard under the Fourteenth Amendment. The Court has since struck down redistricting plans for racial gerrymandering in Miller v. Johnson (1995), Bush v. Vera (1996), and several more cases. However, the Supreme Court struck down part of the Voting Rights Act in Shelby County v. Holder (2013), holding that the racist practices that necessitated the law in 1965 no longer existed in 2013. After the decision, states introduced policies which have been described as reducing voter participation among African-American voters, such as through closing polling places and implementing voter ID laws.

== Black women's suffrage movement ==
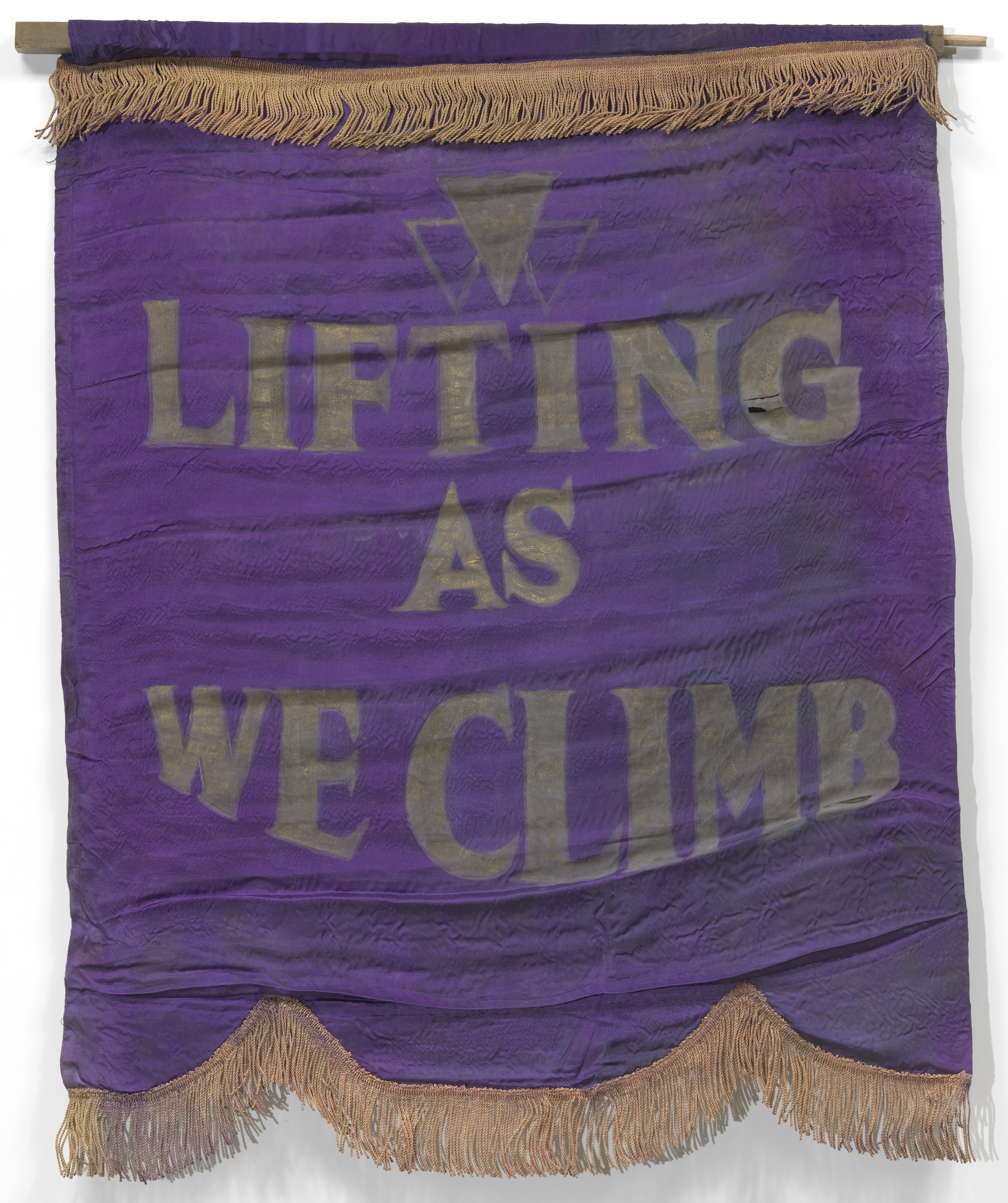
Banner with the National Association of Colored Women's Clubs' motto. Collection of the Smithsonian National Museum of African American History and Culture

Black women began to work for political rights in the 1830s in New York and Philadelphia. Throughout the 19th century, black women like Harriet Forten Purvis, Mary Ann Shadd Cary, and Frances Ellen Watkins Harper worked on black civil rights, like the right to vote. Black women had to fight for racial equality, as well as women's rights. They were often marginalized because of their race and their gender. This led to the creation of groups like the National Association of Colored Women. Black women gained the legal right to vote with the passage of the Nineteenth Amendment to the United States Constitution in 1920. With women gaining the vote, and the passage of the Civil Rights Act, black women became a powerful voting bloc.

Even with having the amendment ratified, Black women were kept from voting using violence and intimidation. Black women protested this in many ways. Some women such as Indiana Little marched to their local voting registrar office and demanded their right to vote.

== See also ==
- 1869 Convention of Colored Citizens of Minnesota
- The Ballot or the Bullet
- Black nationalism
- List of African American suffragists
- Racial Equality Proposal, 1919
- Mary Church Terrell
- Universal suffrage
- Women's suffrage in the United States
- Disfranchisement after the Reconstruction era
