= Negro Fellowship League =

The Negro Fellowship League (NFL) Reading Room and Social Center was one of the first black settlement houses in Chicago. It was founded by Ida B. Wells and her husband Ferdinand Barnett in 1910, and provided social services and community resources for black men arriving in Chicago from the south during the Great Migration. Resources included helping them find employment, housing, voting access, literacy and education resources, and more.

In addition to providing resources to men arriving in the city, the Negro Fellowship League served as an office for Ida B. Wells to organize community events, spread information, and practice her activism. It also served as the meeting location for the Alpha Suffrage Club, the suffrage organization founded by Wells to engage black women voters.

Wells felt strongly that people should have access to educational resources and stay informed on issues. She owned and operated several newspapers, including the Fellowship Herald, the official newspaper for the Negro Fellowship League. The Fellowship Herald was a resource to help community members stay informed on events and issues that many white-owned papers did not cover, particularly around incidents of racially motivated violence and lynching.

== History ==
The Springfield race riot of 1908, which took place in Springfield, Illinois, has been identified as one of the catalysts for the creation of the creation of this community house. Three black men were lynched during the riot, and Wells became concerned about the escalating violence and criminalization of black men coming to Chicago. Many black men at this time were moving to Chicago from the south looking for jobs and housing, but they often struggled to get the employment they needed. Additionally, community centers like the local YMCA did not allow black men to become members at this time. Seeing a great need for community resources, Ida B. Wells and her husband Ferdinand Barnett worked to open the Negro Fellowship League Reading Room and Social Center. Victor Lawson, a wealthy white publisher who owned the Chicago Daily News, was willing to finance the center for the first year. With help from their Sunday School participants to get the organization started, the Negro Fellowship League officially opened on May 1, 1910, at 2830 South State Street.

After a couple years, the initial funding was no longer available. To keep the Negro Fellowship League afloat, Wells moved the center to a smaller location and funded it with her earnings as the first female probation officer in Chicago. Unfortunately, the cost to keep it open became unsustainable, and the center was forced to close in 1920. In the 10 years that the Negro Fellowship League was open, Wells and her colleagues were able to help thousands of black men find jobs and housing.
