= Howard E. Young =

First African American licensed as a pharmacist in Maryland

Howard E. Young (March 12, 1871 – October 3, 1945), was the first African American licensed as a pharmacist in Maryland. Young was born in Baltimore to Reverend Alfred and Emma J. Young. He was educated at M Street High School in Washington, D.C., then he received a degree in pharmacy at Howard University. After finishing postgraduate studies at Howard, Young returned to Baltimore in 1895, where he worked as a drug clerk at a pharmacy in the Seton Hill neighborhood. Shortly, Young opened his own pharmacy on the upper floors of a Y.M.C.A. building in the Madison Park neighborhood at 417 W. Hoffman Street using $100 of his own money. He later expanded to larger corner store located at 1100 Druid Hill Avenue, which opened on May 26, 1900. Five years later, Young married Estelle Hall. They had three children: Howard, Charles, and N. Louise Young.

Young held memberships and positions in various organizations throughout the city: in addition to a membership at the Baltimore branch of the NAACP and serving as president of the Y.M.C.A., Young held memberships in the Maryland Medical, Dental, and Pharmaceutical Association of Afro-American Physicists, as well as the Maryland Pharmacists Association, of which he was the only Black member. In 1927, Mayor William Frederick Broening appointed Young to serve on the Baltimore City Jail Board.

Young was also actively involved in politics and social causes. In 1913, Young attempted to test Baltimore's housing segregation laws in court by purchasing a home on a then-predominately White block in the Upton neighborhood. He lobbied for financial support of the potential court cases, but failed to garner support. The home was later rented. In 1919, he was an unsuccessful Republican primary candidate for the 17th District council seat.

Young continued to work at his pharmacy until late in his life. He died on October 3, 1945, at the age of 74 from a long, undisclosed illness.
