= Bettiola Heloise Fortson =

American poet

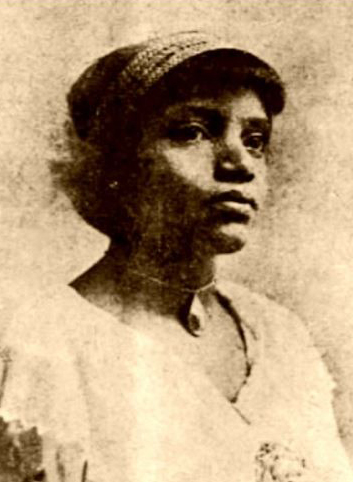
- Born: December 29, 1890; Hopkinsville, Kentucky, US
- Died: April 13, 1917 (aged 26); Chicago, Illinois, US
- Resting place: Mount Forest Cemetery in Thornton, Illinois
- Known for: author, poet and suffragist

Bettiola Heloise Fortson (December 29, 1890 – April 13, 1917) was an African-American poet, essayist, activist and suffragist. Fortson was one of the first African-American people in the Midwestern United States to write and publish a book.

== Biography ==
Bettiola Heloise Fortson was born December 29, 1890, in Hopkinsville, Kentucky, to Mattie Arnold and James Fortson. At the age of 12, she moved to Chicago, Illinois, to live with her aunt but she would periodically move to Evansville, Indiana, to live with her mother when her aunt was traveling. Fortson graduated in 1910 from Clark Street High School in Evansville, and returned to live in Chicago after graduation.

Fortson was a co-founder and president of the University Society of Chicago, a women's club (that included men in membership) that fostered literary studies and had a primary focus on "artistic and intellectual development" among African Americans. She was an active member and second vice president of the Alpha Suffrage Club, the first black women's suffrage association. For two years she was an organizer for City Federation of Colored Women's Clubs.

Fortson was the author of the 1915 book Mental Pearls: original poems and essays, published by Julius F. Taylor. In order to raise money for the publishing of her book, she was offered to publish her poems in The Broad Ax, a weekly African-American newspaper in Chicago. The newspaper sent 500 copies of the paper to sell at the National Federation of Colored Women's Clubs that year and they allowed the proceeds to go to Fortson. Her poems were included in the book Six Poets of Racial Uplift, published in 1996 by G K Hall.

== Death ==
Fortson died from tuberculosis at her home 3413 Prairie Avenue in Chicago, Illinois, on April 13, 1917, at the age of 26. Her eulogy was read by Ida B. Wells. Fortson was buried at the Mount Forest Cemetery in Thornton, Illinois, which was primarily an African-American cemetery.

== See also ==
- African-American Woman Suffrage Movement
- Woman's club movement
