= African-American women's suffrage movement =

African-American women's voting rights in the USA

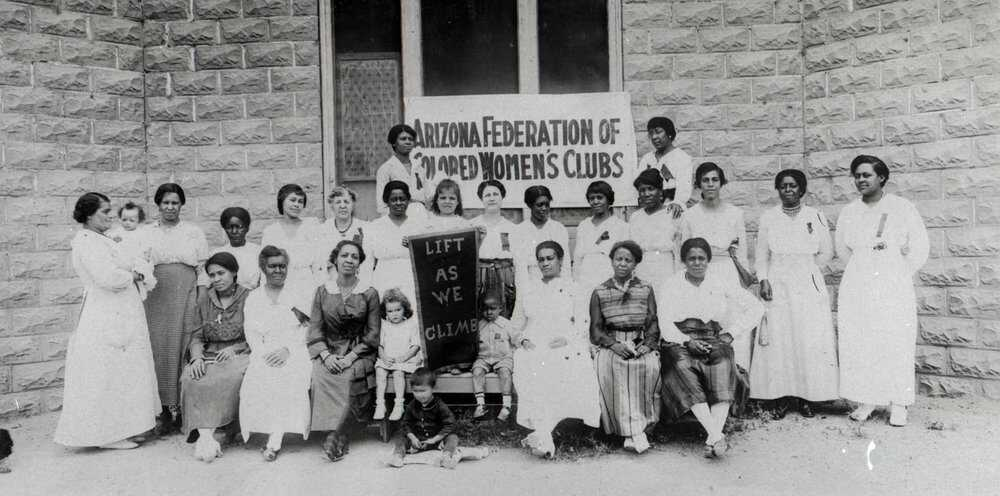
Arizona Federation of Colored Women's Clubs in 1909.

African-American women began to agitate for political rights in the 1830s, creating the Boston Female Anti-Slavery Society, Philadelphia Female Anti-Slavery Society, and New York Female Anti-Slavery Society. These interracial groups were radical expressions of women's political ideals, and they led directly to voting rights activism before and after the Civil War. Throughout the 19th century, African-American women such as Harriet Forten Purvis, Mary Ann Shadd Cary, and Frances Ellen Watkins Harper worked on two fronts simultaneously: reminding African-American men and white women that Black women needed legal rights, especially the right to vote.

After the Civil War, women's rights activists disagreed about whether to support ratification of the 15th Amendment, which provided voting rights regardless of race, but which did not explicitly enfranchise women. The resulting split in the women's movement marginalized all women and African-American women nonetheless continued their suffrage activism. By the 1890s, the women's suffrage movement had become increasingly racist and exclusionary, and African-American women organized separately through local women's clubs and the National Association of Colored Women. Women won the vote in dozens of states in the 1910s, and African-American women became a powerful voting bloc.

The struggle for the vote did not end with the ratification of the Nineteenth Amendment in 1920, which expanded voting rights substantially, but did not address the racial terrorism that prevented African Americans in southern states from voting, regardless of sex. Women such as Fannie Lou Hamer, Ella Baker, and Diane Nash continued the fight for voting rights for all, culminating in the passage of the Voting Rights Act of 1965.

== Origins of the movement ==
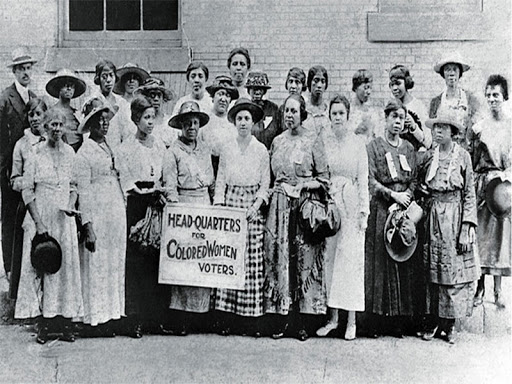
Headquarters for Colored Women Voters, Colored Women Voters League, Georgia c. 1920.

The origins of the women's suffrage movement are tied to the Abolitionist movement. Upper-class white women in particular first articulated their own oppression in marriage and the private sphere using the metaphor of slavery, and they first developed a political consciousness by mobilizing in support of abolitionism. Lucretia Mott, Elizabeth Cady Stanton, and Maria Weston Chapman were among the early female abolitionists. The Abolitionist cause provided women who were previously bound to their roles as wives and mothers the opportunity to publicly challenge sexism and learn how to politically engage as activists, though the African-American women's suffrage movement was a different vein of women's suffrage, and one could even argue a different movement altogether. Abolitionists who headed the Equal Rights Association like Elizabeth Cady Stanton and Susan B. Anthony had a primarily white agenda. After the Civil War it became clear that black and white women had different views of why the right to vote was essential. Unlike white suffragists, Black women sought the ballot for themselves and their men to empower black communities besieged by the reign of racial terror that erupted after Emancipation in the late 1800s.

== The movement splits ==
The racism that defined the early twentieth century made it so black women were oppressed from every side: first, for their status as women, and then again for their race. Many politically engaged African-American women were primarily invested in matters of racial equality, with suffrage later materializing as a secondary goal. The Seneca Falls Convention, widely lauded as the first women's rights convention, is often considered the precursor to the racial schism within the women's suffrage movement; the Seneca Falls Declaration put forth a political analysis of the condition of upper-class, married women, but did not address the struggles of working-class white women or black women. Well into the twentieth century, a pattern emerged of segregated political activism, as black and white women organized separately due to class and racial tensions within the overall movement, and a fundamental difference in movement goals and political consciousness.

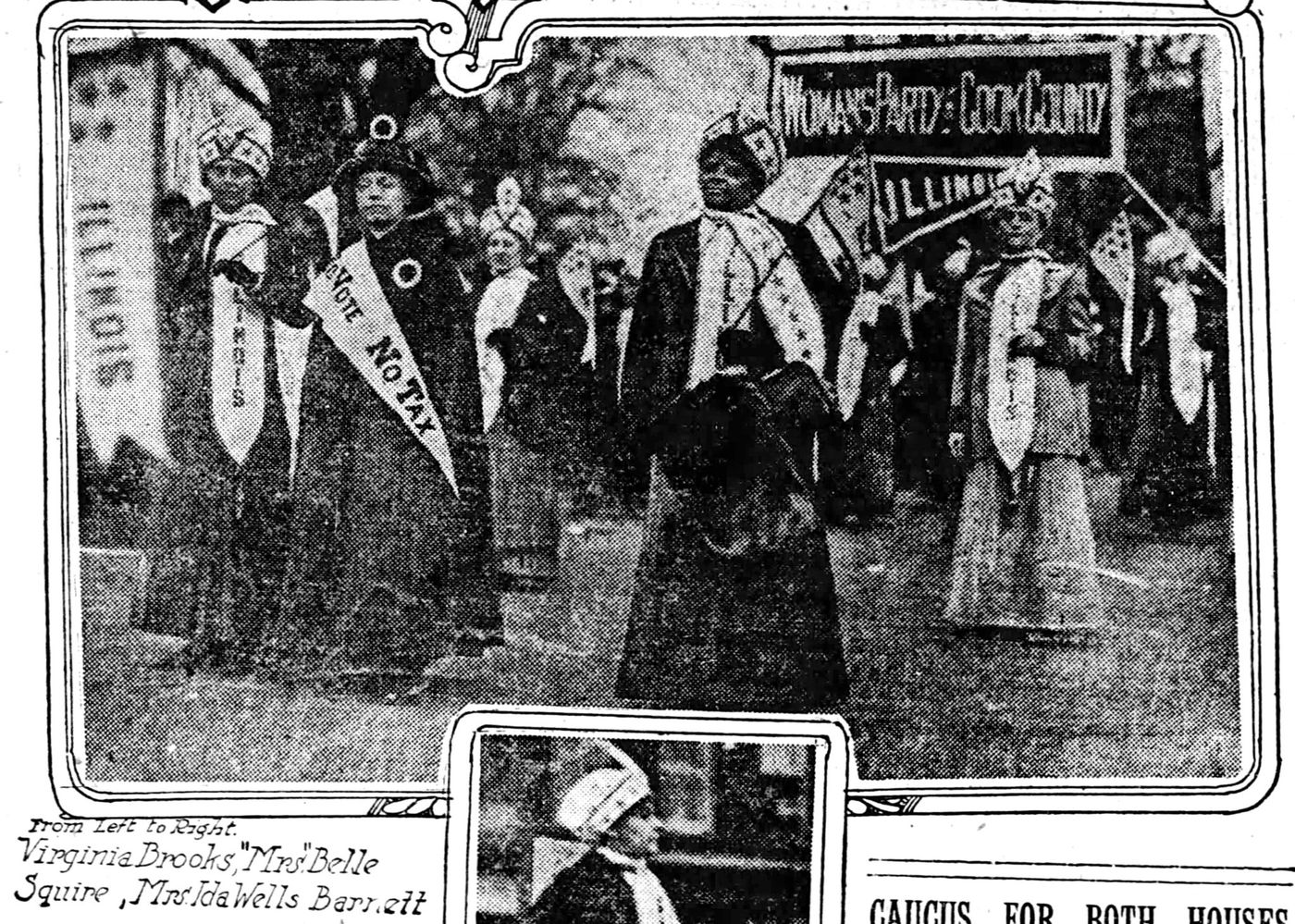
Ida B. Wells at 1913 suffrage parade, published in Chicago Daily Tribune May 1913.

Black women engaged in multi-pronged activism, as they did not often separate the goal of obtaining the franchise from other goals, and wide-scale racism added to the urgency of their more multi-faceted activism. Most black women who supported the expansion of the franchise sought to better the lives of black women alongside black men and children, which radically set them apart from their white counterparts. While white women were focused on obtaining the franchise, black women sought the betterment of their communities overall, rather than their individual betterment exclusively as women. In Women, Race and Class, Angela Davis explains that "black women were equal to their men in the oppression they suffered ... and they resisted slavery with a passion equal to their men's", which highlights the source of their more holistic activism. Following the civil war, many African-American women struggled to keep their interests at the forefront of the political sphere, as many reformers tended to assume in their rhetoric assuming "black to be male and women to be white".

== Marginalizing African-American women ==
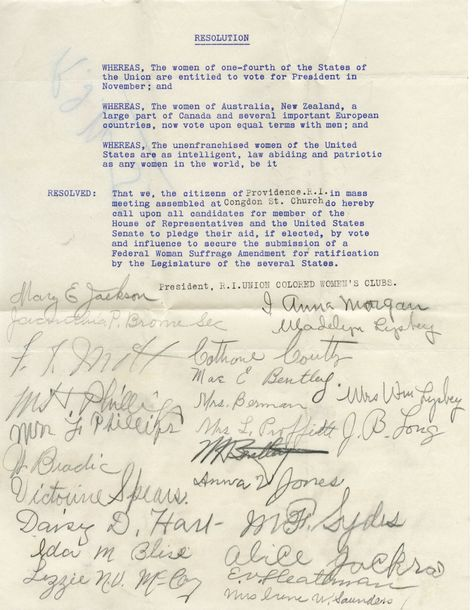
Rhode Island Union Colored Women's Clubs Supporting Federal Woman Suffrage Amendment, 1916

In 1890, two rival organizations, the National Woman Suffrage Association and the American Woman Suffrage Association, merged to form the National American Woman Suffrage Association (NAWSA). As NAWSA began gaining support for its cause, its members realized that the exclusion of African-American women would gain greater support, resulting in the adoption of a more narrow view of women's suffrage than had been previously asserted. NAWSA focused on enfranchisement solely for white women. African-American women began experiencing the "Anti-Black" women's suffrage movement. The National Woman Suffrage Association considered the Northeastern Federation of Colored Women's Clubs to be a liability to the association due to Southern white women's attitudes toward black women getting the vote. Southern whites feared African Americans gaining more political advantage and thus power; African-American women voters would help to achieve this change.

The African-American women's suffrage movement began with women such as Harriet Tubman and Sojourner Truth, and it progressed to women like Ida B. Wells, Mary Church Terrell, Ella Baker, Rosa Parks, Angela Davis, and many others. All of these women played very important roles, such as contributing to the growing progress and effort to end African-American women's disenfranchisement. These women were discriminated against, abused, and raped by white southerners and northerners, yet they remained strong and persistent, and that strength has been passed down from generation to generation. It is still carried on in African-American families today. "African American women, have been political activists for their entire history on the American continent but long denied the right to vote and hold office, have resorted to nontraditional politics."

After her arrest in 1970, "[Angela] Davis became a political prisoner. National and international protests to free Angela were mobilized around the world. During the two years that she spent in prison, Davis read, wrote essays on injustices, and prepared as co-counsel for her own defense. Eventually, Davis was released on bail in 1972 and later acquitted of all criminal charges at her jury trial."

=== Creation of the National Association of Colored Women ===
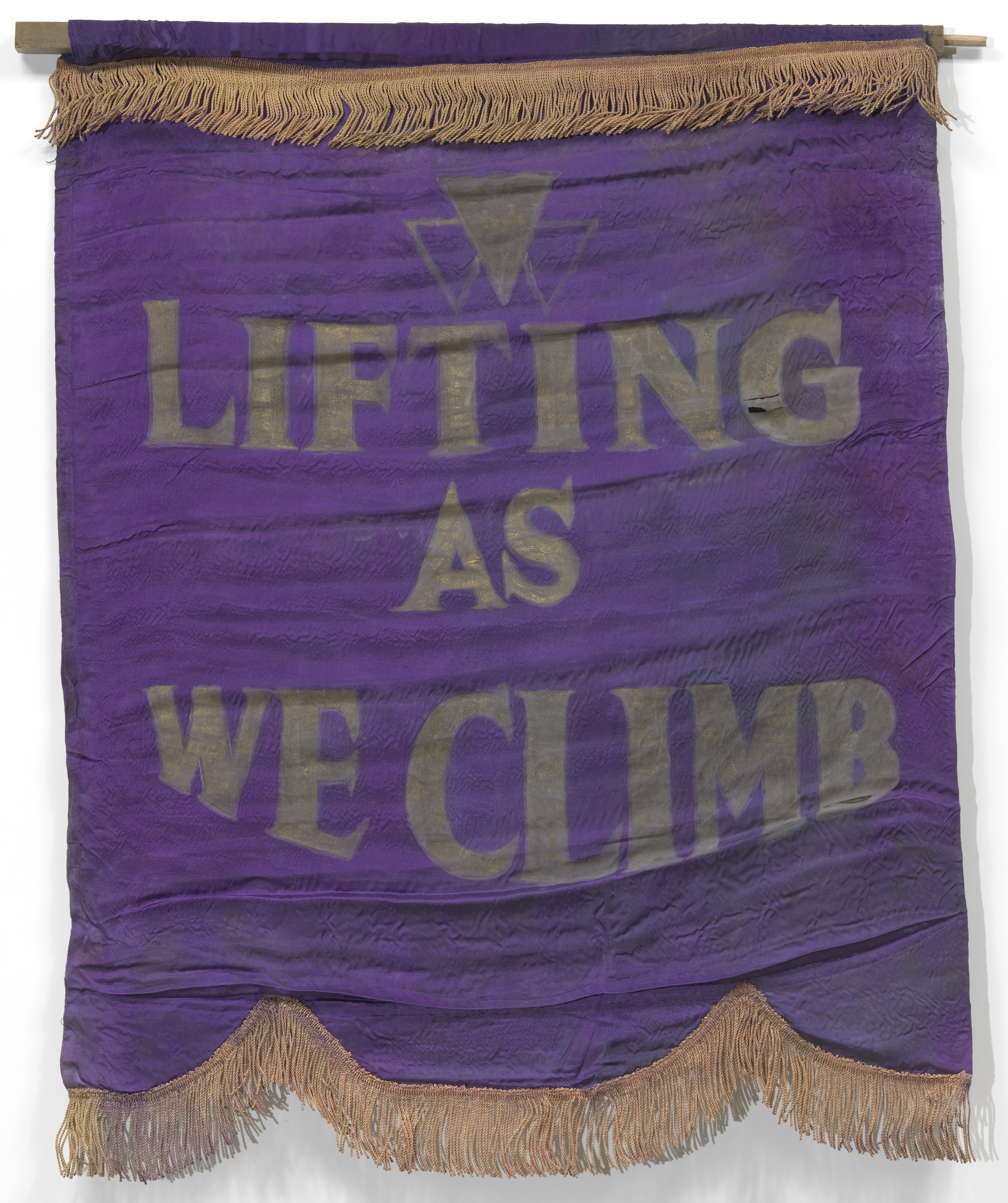
Banner with the National Association of Colored Women's Clubs' motto. Collection of the Smithsonian National Museum of African American History and Culture.

The American Women's Suffrage movement began in the north as a middle-class white woman's movement with most of their members educated white women primarily from Boston, New York, Maine, and the Northeast. Attempts were made by the National Women's Suffrage Association (NWSA) to include working-class women, as well as black suffragists. In 1866 the American Equal Rights Association was formed with the belief that everyone regardless of race or sex should be given the right to vote. During this time period a division was forming among the women's movement. The 14th Amendment was being proposed and black males were on the cusp of receiving the right to vote. The NSWA held a convention to discuss how to go forward and the women were divided on the issue. Some women did not want to risk losing the chance for black males to get the right to vote, and figured that the women would get their turn. They saw this proposed amendment as a victory of sorts. Other women, including Susan B. Anthony and Elizabeth Cady Stanton, were angered by this decision and felt that it was not good enough, and that women should not be excluded from the vote.

The Fourteenth and Fifteenth Amendments were eventually passed by Congress and women were still not granted the right to vote. As time went on the leaders of the National Women's Suffrage Association began to see African-American Suffrage and White Suffrage as different issues. The reasons for this change in ideals varies, but in the 1890s younger women began to take the leadership roles and people such as Stanton and Anthony were no longer in charge. Another reason for the change in ideals among the movement was the growing "white supremacy" thinking of women entering the movement from the south. Now with dissention and disagreement among the NWSA, African-American women left and banded together to form their own organizations.

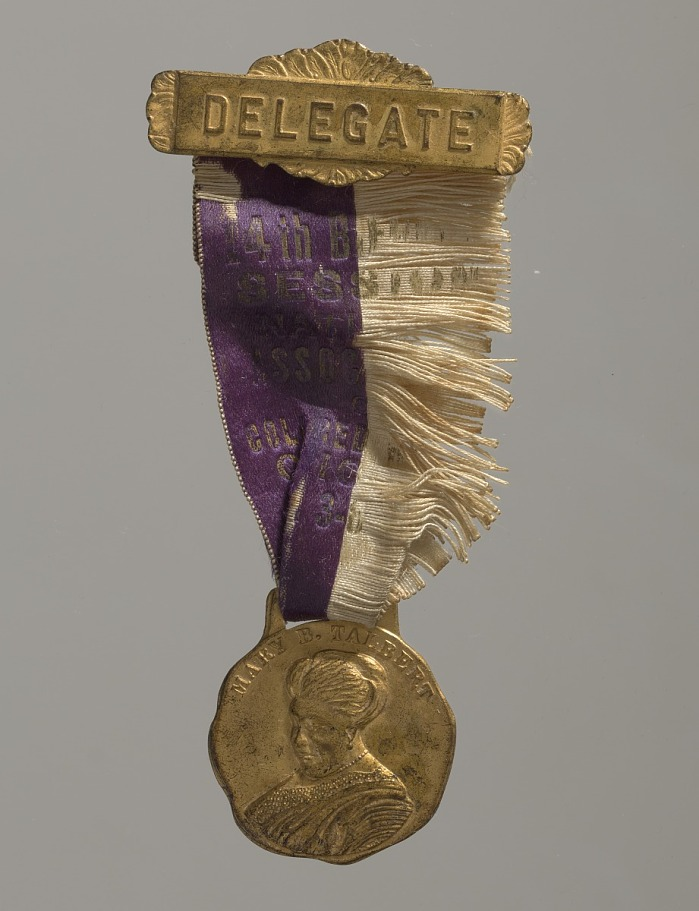
Delegate's badge worn by Mamie Williams at the 1914 National Association of Colored Women's Convention.

In June 1892, the Colored Women's League (CWL) was founded in Washington, D.C. Under their president, Helen Appo Cook, the CWL fought for black suffrage and held night classes. A Boston-based group under the leadership of Margaret Murray Washington and Josephine St. Pierre Ruffin called the National Federation of Afro-American Women joined the Colored Women's League out of Washington, D.C. In 1896, both groups combined to form the National Association of Colored Women under the leadership of Mary Church Terrell. Terrell was a college educated woman and was named the first president. This group did many things to contribute to the betterment of black women, as well as many other smaller groups who are not named.

== The "educated suffragist" ==
The NAWSA's movement marginalized many African-American women and through this effort was developed the idea of the "educated suffragist". This was the notion that being educated was an important prerequisite for being allowed the right to vote. Since many African-American women were uneducated, this notion meant exclusion from the right to vote. This movement was prevalent in the South but eventually gained momentum in the North as well. African-American women were not deterred by the rising opposition and became even more aggressive in their campaign to find equality with men and other women.

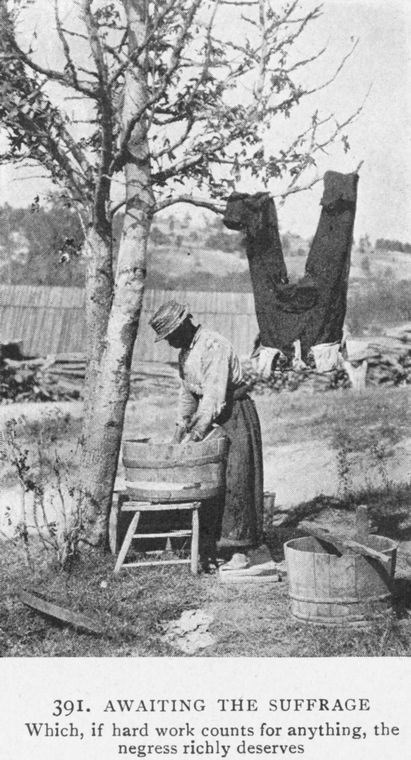
"Awaiting the Suffrage Which if hard work counts for anything, the Negress richly deserves, 1910"

As a result, many women mobilized during this time period and worked to get African-American women involved and included in the suffrage movement, by focusing on the education of the African-American community and women on local government issues. In 1913, the Alpha Suffrage Club was founded, with Ida B. Wells as one of the co-founders and leaders, this is believed to be the first African-American women's suffrage association in the United States. The group worked in publishing the Alpha Suffrage Record newspaper to canvas neighborhoods and voice political opinions. One of the many black women focused on advancing literary "artistic and intellectual development" among African Americans in the north was Bettiola Heloise Fortson. Fortson had been an active member of various women's clubs in the Chicago area and she founded her own women's literary studies club, the University Society of Chicago.

All the African-American women who participated in this important struggle against their exclusion from the women's suffrage movement waited seventy years or more to see the fruits of their labour.

== Issues in exercising the vote ==
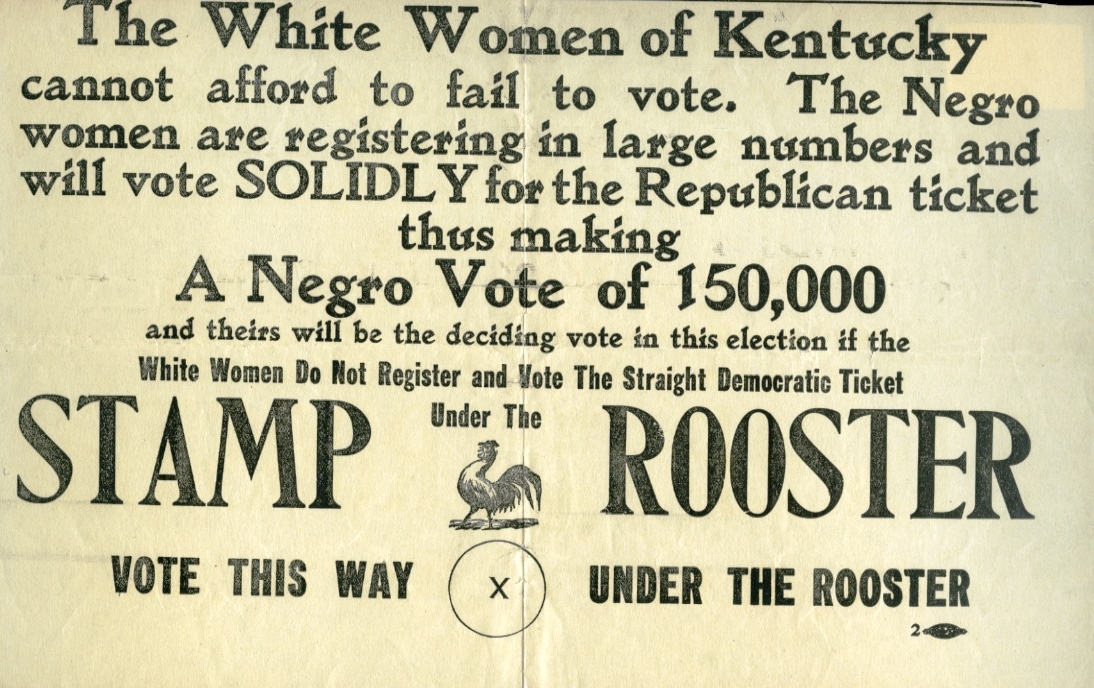
A broadside urging "The White Women of Kentucky" to vote and offset African-Americans who had already registered for the vote.

After the passage of the Nineteenth Amendment in 1920, African-American women, particularly those inhabiting Southern states, still faced a number of barriers. At first, African-American women in the North were easily able to register to vote, and quite a few became actively involved in politics.

One such woman was Annie Simms Banks who was chosen to serve as a delegate to Kentucky's Republican Party convention in March 1920.

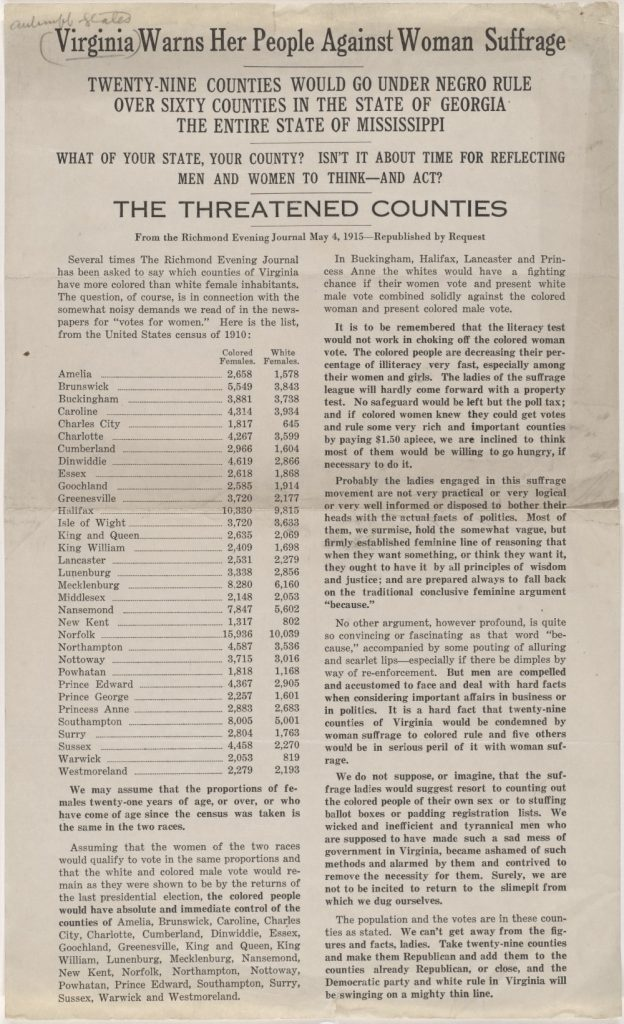
Anti-suffragists in Virginia expressing that African American women could outnumber white women in voter turnout.

White southerners took notice of African-American female activists organizing themselves for suffrage, and after the passage of the Nineteenth Amendment, African-American women's voter registration in Florida was higher than white women's. African-American women were targeted by a number of disenfranchisement methods. These included having to wait in line for up to twelve hours to register to vote, pay head taxes, and undergo new tests. One of the new tests required that African-American women read and interpret the Constitution before being deemed eligible to vote. In the South, African-American women faced the most severe obstacles to voting. These obstacles included bodily harm and fabricated charges designed to land them in jail if they attempted to vote. This treatment of African-American women in the South continued up until the 1960s.

== See also ==
- List of African American suffragists
- Black suffrage in Pennsylvania

=== Biographical links ===
- Christia Adair
- Hallie Quinn Brown
- Josephine Beall Willson Bruce
- Nannie Helen Burroughs
- Helen Appo Cook
- Coralie Franklin Cook
- Anna J. Cooper
- Elizabeth Piper Ensley
- Margaretta Forten
- Nellie Griswold Francis
- Sarah Moore Grimké
- Frances Harper
- Verina Morton Jones
- Daisy Elizabeth Adams Lampkin
- Indiana Little
- Mary A. McCurdy
- Millie Lawson Bethell Paxton
- Juno Frankie Pierce
- Sarah Parker Remond
- Myra Virginia Simmons
- Mary Church Terrell
- Hettie Tilghman
- Sojourner Truth
- Ida B. Wells
- Maud E. Craig Sampson Williams
- Fannie Barrier Williams
- Estelle Hall Young

=== Historical links ===
- Ain't I a Woman?
- Alpha Suffrage Club
- American Equal Rights Association
- Equal Suffrage League (Brooklyn)
- Fannie Jackson Coppin Club
- National Association of Colored Women

=== General history ===
- Timeline of voting rights in the United States
- Timeline of women's suffrage
- Timeline of women's suffrage in the United States
- Women's suffrage in the United States
- Timeline of women's legal rights in the United States (other than voting)
- Native Americans and women's suffrage in the United States
