= N. Louise Young =

American physician

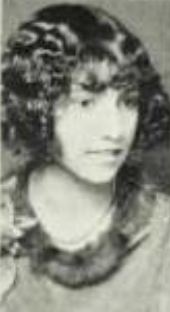
- N. Louise Young, from the 1927 yearbook of Howard University
- Born: June 7, 1907; Baltimore, Maryland
- Died: September 22, 1997 (aged 90)
- Occupation: Physician
- Parent(s): Howard E. Young, Estelle Hall Young

Nellie Louise Young (June 7, 1907 – September 22, 1997) was the first African American woman licensed to practice medicine in Maryland.

== Early life and education ==
Young was born in Baltimore, Maryland, to Howard E. Young, Maryland's first African American pharmacist, and Estelle Hall Young. Her father's pharmacy served as a place of inspiration for Young as a child: "I admired the doctors," she recalled, "and I wanted to be able to send my prescriptions to my father's drugstore."

She attended the old Colored High School (now Frederick Douglass High School) in Baltimore. Following her graduation in 1924, Young enrolled in Howard University where she earned her bachelor of science degree in social sciences in 1927, and later obtained her medical degree from the Howard University School of Medicine in 1930. She was initiated into the Alpha chapter of Alpha Kappa Alpha sorority.

== Career ==
Young initially served as an intern at Freedmen's Hospital in Washington, D.C., after she was not accepted to the Provident Hospital in Baltimore due to the lack of housing accommodations for women. After her internship, Dr. Young opened her own practice in offices above her father's drugstore in 1932. In 1934, she accepted an invitation from W.E.B. DuBois to attend an NAACP conference.

Around the same time, she was appointed staff physician at the Maryland Training School for Girls, where she served from 1933 to 1940. When the Baltimore health department budget was cut in 1933, Young volunteered her services to ensure coverage in the colored schools. Young also advocated for frank and practical sex education for girls.

Young believed that physicians should be free to choose their medical specialities "regardless of sex, race, color, and creed." Young's initial medical specialization was pediatrics, but after the death of an infant, she switched her specialization to gynecology. During that time, she became the only African American physician to receive training in birth control at the Baltimore Birth Control Clinic, where she was trained by Dr. Bessie Moses. With funding from the Baltimore Birth Control Clinic, Dr. Young opened a Planned Parenthood Clinic, located at 1523 McCulloh Street, which was one of only three such clinics then staffed entirely by African Americans in the entire United States in May 1938. After ten years at the clinic, Young was granted residency to specialize in ob-gyn at Provident Hospital, where she served as chief from 1950 to 1963. She worked at several area hospitals, often integrating the staff, until her retirement in 1984 after fifty-two years of practicing medicine.

== Death ==
Young died in 1997, at the age of 90, of Alzheimer's disease. She is buried in the Mount Auburn Cemetery in Baltimore.
