= Anna Simms Banks =

American educator and political figure (1862–1923)

Anna B. Simms Banks
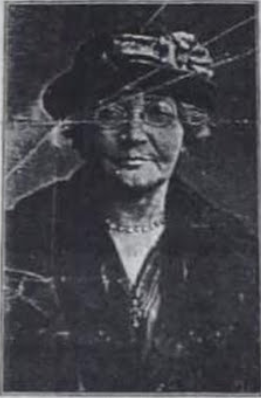
- Born: 1862; Louisville, Kentucky, U.S.
- Died: 1923 (aged 60–61); Winchester, Kentucky, U.S.
- Occupations: Suffragist, orator, politician
- Political party: Republican
- Spouse: William Webb Banks
- Parent(s): Isabella and Marcus (or Marquis) Simms

Anna Simms Banks (1862–1923) was an American educator and political figure born in Brandenburg, Kentucky. On March 3, 1920, Anna became the first African-American female elected as a delegate at the 7th Congressional District Republican Convention in Kentucky, a time when women in Kentucky could vote for president but did not have full suffrage. Banks was appointed a member of the Rules Committee. She taught in Louisville and later died in Winchester, Kentucky.

== Family life ==
Banks was born in Brandenburg, Kentucky, to mother Isabelle, a domestic servant, and father Marquis Simms, a barber She was a schoolteacher in Louisville and on July 10, 1906, married William Webb Banks a correspondent for both white and African-American newspapers who was politically active about the issue of civil rights for African Americans.

== Political life ==
Anna traveled to New York City and Washington D.C. in 1913 while accompanying her husband during his duties as Kentucky Commissioner to the Emancipation Exposition and was exposed to contemporary political culture.

She later helped organize African-American hospital workers in Winchester.

After being elected as a delegate at the 7th Congressional District Republican Convention in Kentucky, Simms announced: "We are just beginning to open our eyes in politics, but before long we are going to make ourselves felt, and you can depend on Annie Simms Banks, of Winchester, to do her part for the grand old party".

Banks died three years later of pneumonia in Winchester, Kentucky, and her obituary called her a "prominent race leader". Her husband died two years later and was buried next to her.
