= 1869 Convention of Colored Citizens of Minnesota =

The 1869 Convention of Colored Citizens of Minnesota was the first integrated convention meeting of black and white men in Minnesota, and occurred in Ingersoll Hall, Saint Paul a year after the state of Minnesota voted in favor of black suffrage. The convention is distinct from other conventions of the time for having numerous white Republicans speak at the convention.

== Background ==
At the end of the American Civil War voting rights for blacks was becoming a contentious issue in many northern states. The black population in Minnesota had grown rapidly since the years preceding the Civil War, from 39 in 1850 to 700 in 1868, a fact black activists were not unaware of. As a result of these tensions, Republicans in the state continued to push for black suffrage, with fierce opposition from Democrats. In 1868, Minnesota held their third referendum on the issue of black voting rights. The referendum passed with 57% of voters voting yes on the referendum, granting all black men in the state suffrage.

== Major Issues of the Convention ==
The Convention was called to celebrate the successful referendum on black suffrage in 1868. Both white and black speakers were present at the convention, with Republican politicians talking about their own efforts to push forward a referendum to give blacks suffrage. Republican politicians also took part in the festivities, singing songs and eating food alongside the black leaders of the convention The members of the Convention, whether black or white, discussed the contents of the referendum, referencing how it removed the word white from the requirement for voting in the state of Minnesota White attendees of the Convention, mainly Republican political leaders, heaped praise upon what they referred to as the black race. They stressed how they had become increasingly impressed by the intelligence and civility black leaders had expressed, both in the present in the past. They pointed to great black speakers and leaders like Toussaint Louverture and Frederick Douglass, The black members of the convention thanked the white Republicans present numerous times for their efforts, and lead the proceedings of the Convention, which largely involved guest speakers and songs men of both races sang. There were also white Democrats present, which were referenced by White Republicans in a consolatory manner.

== Key Figures ==
William Rainey Marshall, the governor of Minnesota, was invited as a guest speaker. Marshall gave brief remarks at the convention congratulating the African Americans on their newfound rights. Marshall helped put the amendment to give black men the right to vote on the ballot as a referendum.

Maurice Jernigan, a barber in the city of St.Paul, was an early black rights advocate and influential figure in early black suffrage movements. Jernigan served as permanent chairman and temporary president of the convention.

== See also ==
- Jacob H. Stewart, mayor of the city of St. Paul
- Ignatius Donnelly, progressive member of Congress and a popular author of the Gilded Age
- Colored Conventions Movement
- Civil Rights Movements
