= Indiana Little =

American political activists (1897–1970)

- Born: Indiana Tuggle; April 15, 1897; Georgia
- Died: September 22, 1970 (aged 73); Birmingham, Alabama
- Known for: Black suffrage

Indiana Little (1897–1970) was an activist for the voting rights of Black Americans. She is most well known for leading a large march to the voting registrar's office in Birmingham, Alabama on Monday, January 18, 1926. The numbers at the march range from hundreds to one thousand. Little was arrested and released on a bond of $300 or $5328 in USD today.

== Biography ==
Indiana Tuggle was born in Wyatt, Georgia April 15, 1897. Her parents were George and Harriet Tuggle, both of whom were farm laborers. She was the eighth of nine children. She went to school through seventh grade and could read and write. Tuggle married Terrell Little in 1918 and had two children in Georgia, Lessie and Elease, before moving to Birmingham in 1923.

=== Black suffrage ===
==== Background ====
Even though the Nineteenth Amendment to the United States Constitution was ratified in 1920, white officials in Birmingham and throughout the Southern United States did not allow Black people to vote. Threats of violence and intimidation from white citizens kept Black people, particularly women, from exercising their legal right to the ballot.

Little quickly became known as a prominent and well-respected member of the Black community in Birmingham.

==== January 1926 march ====
On January 18, 1926, after having been denied the right to vote a week before, Little led between a few hundred and one thousand Black men and women to the voting registrar's office in an attempt to get Black citizens registered to vote. At the office Little stated: "I am a free-born citizen of America and by the fourteenth amendment of the U.S. constitution I shall not be denied the right to vote because of race, color, or sex, and I will not move until I have been registered." Little charged the board of registrars with giving intelligence tests to Black people but not white people, thus discriminating against Black people who had had education withheld from them.

She and those who accompanied her were not allowed to register, and she was arrested and beat for her attempt. While in prison, she was manhandled and struck. Her bail was posted at $300, a value of $5328 now, and she was released. Her march and arrest sparked nation-wide debate in newspapers through 1930 and inspired subsequent marches in later years.

== Late life and death ==
Little remained in Birmingham to her death and stayed active in her community and church. She was president of the Missionary Society, a Sunday school teacher, and the Training Union teacher at the 23rd Street Baptist church. She was finally registered to vote at 55 and voted for the first time in 1957. She died September 22, 1970.

== See also ==
- List of suffragists and suffragettes
