= Belle Squire =

American suffragist

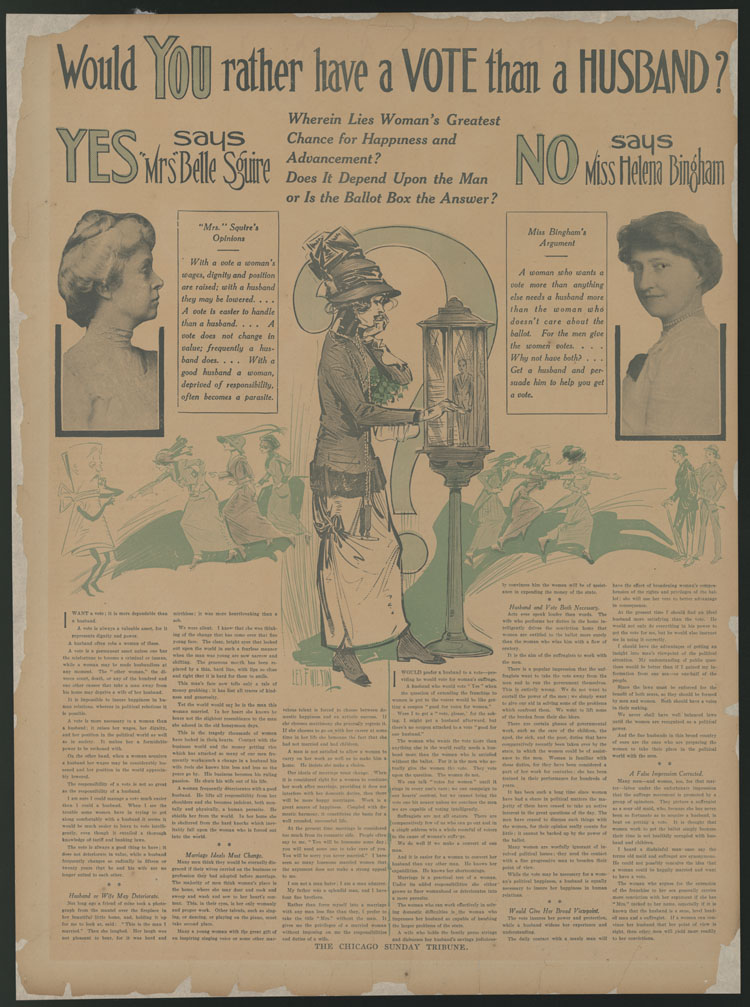
"Would you rather have a vote than a husband? yes says Belle Squire"

Belle Squire, properly Viola Belle Squire, (1870–1939) was a suffragist from Illinois who was involved in the Chicago suffrage movement and co-founded the Alpha Suffrage Club with Ida B. Wells. She was especially known for her opposition to paying taxes when women did not have a right to vote. Squire argued expecting women to pay taxes while they were not enfranchised was a form of taxation without representation.

== Publications ==
Squire published the book The Woman Movement in America: A short Account of the Struggle for Equal Rights in 1911. Her goal with this publication was to share information about the complex struggle for women's suffrage and to engage her readers through her use of images alongside the text. In the preface she wrote, "I have hoped...to interest the boys and girls of the nation in this, perhaps the greatest of all movements the world has ever seen. If then by means of what I have here hastily and imperfectly written there will be a better understanding of the meaning of "Votes for Women" in the widest and most comprehensive sense, my mission will have been accomplished."

== Involvement with the Alpha Suffrage Club and the Chicago suffrage movement ==
1913 telegram from Chicago suffragists protesting the deportation of British suffragette Emmeline Pankhurst

Belle Squire was an active member of the Alpha Suffrage Club along with notable suffragist Ida B. Wells. This club was formed in 1913 and was the first suffrage organization for African American women. Both women actively campaigned for African American women voting rights and were politically connected to the national suffrage movement. On October 18, 1913 Squire signed on to a telegram to President Wilson calling on him to end the deportation order against British suffragette Emmeline Pankhurst. Dozens of Chicago women signed onto this letter, including Jane Addams. The women appealed to Wilson to "admit Mrs. Pankhurst; thus maintaining high traditions of America's devotion to liberty and right of free speech."

== 1913 Washington, D.C. suffrage march ==
In 1913 Wells integrated the 1913 suffrage march in Washington affiliated with the National American Women's Suffrage Association, which was organized by suffragists Alice Paul and Lucy Burns. Although Wells was told by one parade organizer to walk with other black women despite a NAWSA decision that black women could march where they wished, she refused to do so. Wells and Squire marched with the Illinois delegation and Squire was pictured wearing a "no vote no tax" sash (see picture at right).

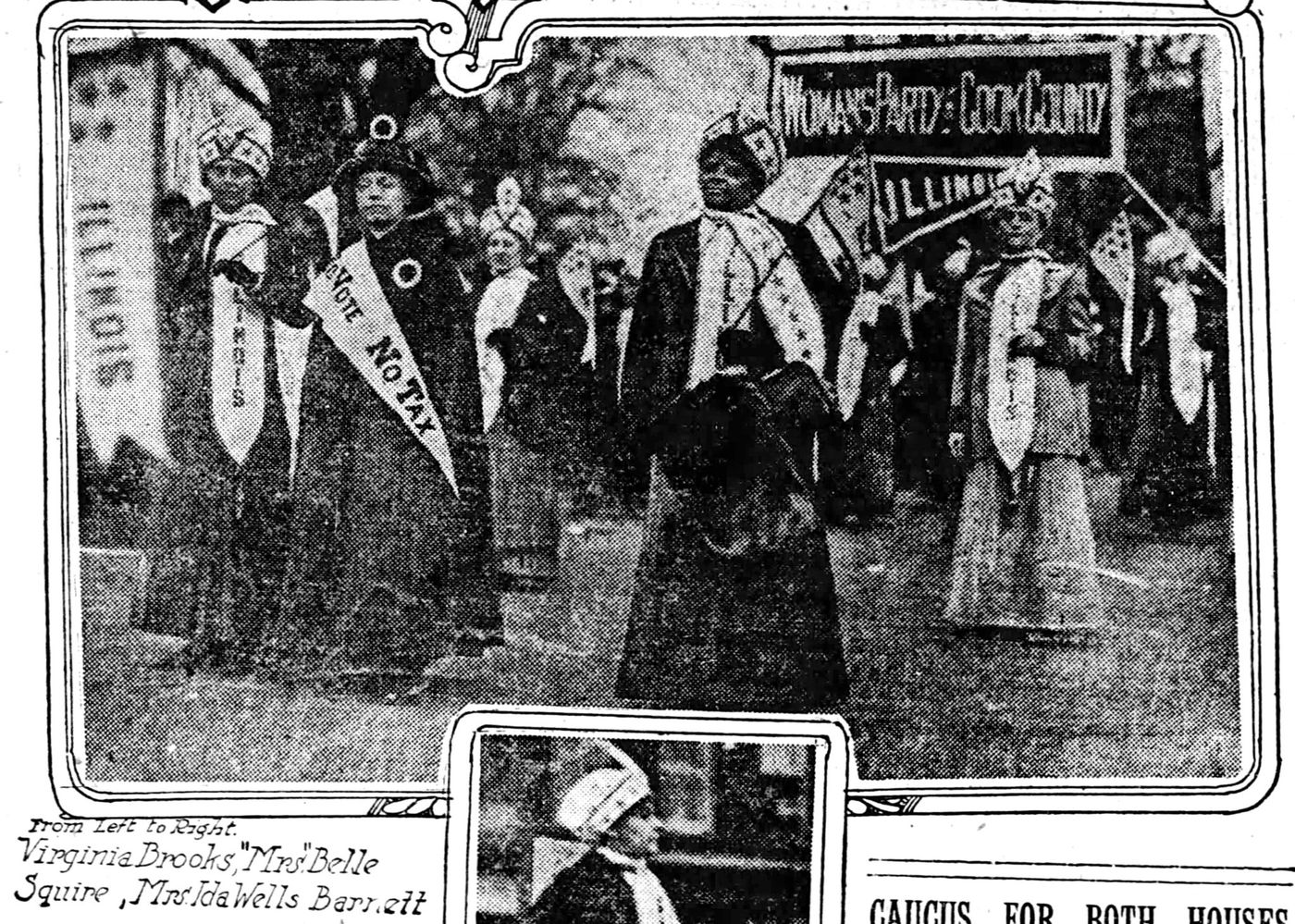
Wells & Squire marching in 1913

After the march Wells was honored for her political bravery at a gathering at the Progressive Club of Quinn Chapel in Utah where Squire spoke at an evening reception.

== Opposition to taxation ==
Belle Squire's public protest against unfair taxation of women who were disenfranchised was well documented during her lifetime. In 1910 she refused to pay taxes on her Illinois property. It was also in 1910 that Squire led the "No Vote, No Tax League" and inspired at least 5,000 women in Cook County to refuse to pay their taxes. In 1912 she served as leader of the No Vote No Tax League of Illinois. She also worked with Miss Margaret Haley, also from Chicago, to organize tax resisting women. That year she was quoted as saying, "I am not a tax dodger but I announce from this time on I am and will be delinquent until, by the consent of your kind, I arrive at the full stature of adult life and am regarded as a normal human being upon whose shoulders rest part of the responsibility of political life with its privileges and duties as well. When that time comes I will cheerfully and honestly pay my share of government expenses."

== Personal life ==
Belle Squire was born in 1870 in the city of Lima, Ohio. Although Squire was unmarried she insisted on being referred to as "Mrs. Belle Squire." In 1913 numerous newspapers reported on her unique political protest noting she stated that year, "Society is an organism, a giant with hands and feet, a rudimentary brain, not much intellect and just the glimmer of a conscience. The reformers are the surgeons and the doctors. Each has his own remedy. Each believes an operation is necessary. So do I...Why should a woman remain Miss until death or marriage? The boy changes his title from master to mister as soon as he wishes--as soon as he gets into long pants and is introduced to a razor. They say it's confusing. They will not know then whether we are single or married. I don't think it is anybody's business what we are. Why should we be obliged to print our marital relations on our business cards? Men don't." Squire worked professionally as a music teacher.

== Later years ==
In 1924 Squire moved to France and lived there for a decade. She died at the age of 69 in 1939 and is buried in Forest Park, Illinois.
