= Alpha Suffrage Club =

Black female suffrage club in Chicago, Illinois

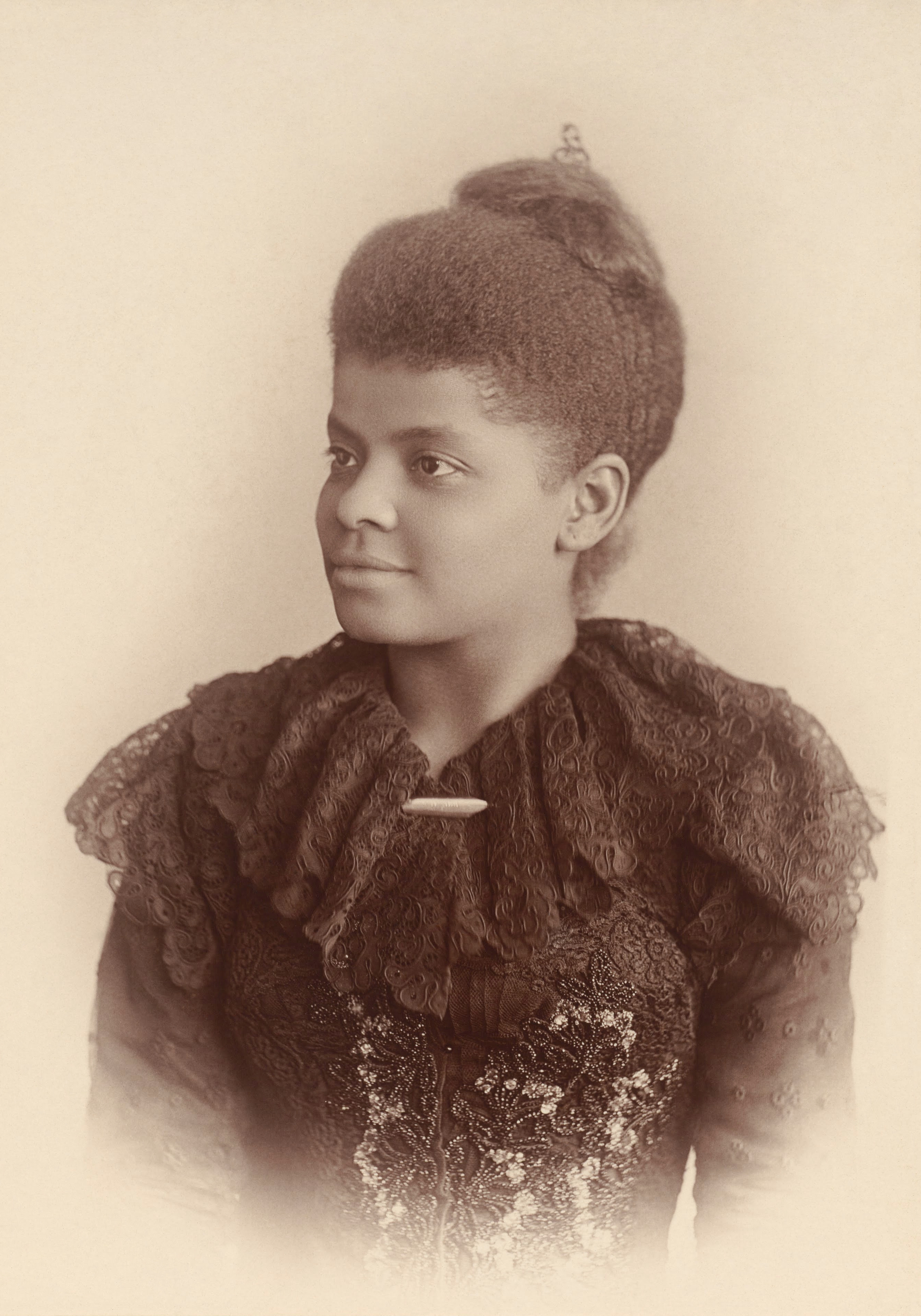
Ida B. Wells, founder of the Alpha Suffrage Club

The Alpha Suffrage Club was the first and most important black female suffrage club in Chicago and one of the most important in Illinois. It was founded on January 30, 1913, by Ida B. Wells with the help of her white colleagues Belle Squire and Virginia Brooks. The Club aimed to give a voice to African American women who had been excluded from national suffrage organizations such as the National American Women Suffrage Association (NAWSA). Its stated purpose was to inform black women of their civic responsibility and to organize them to help elect candidates who would best serve the interests of African Americans in Chicago.

The club was formed after women in Chicago were granted the right to vote in the year 1910. It fought against the white Chicago women who were trying to ban African Americans from voting altogether. They also wanted to promote the election of African Americans to public office. As Wells stated in her autobiography, "we (women) could use our vote for the advantage of ourselves and our race." Quoted in the Chicago Defender, a local black newspaper, she was more specific, stating that the object of the Alpha Suffrage Club was to make women "strong enough to help elect some conscientious race man as alderman." Besides focusing on women's newly gained civil duty to vote, Wells also encouraged these women to ensure that their husbands were taking seriously their responsibility to vote as well, recognizing the "sacredness" of the vote to both sexes.

At the first anniversary of the club's founding, Kentucky-born poet Bettiola Heloise Fortson, vice-president of the club, read her poem "Brothers" which told the story of two men who had been lynched by a mob for their attempt to save their sister from her imprisonment by a farmer in Alabama as a slave.

In October 2021, a historic marker for the Alpha Suffrage Club on the National Votes for Women Trail was placed at its former site at the corner of 31st and State Street in Chicago.

== Historical context ==
1913, the year in which the club was founded, was a time still rife with Jim Crow laws and casual discrimination. Black women were subservient to men and other white women and denied education and social mobility. They were also confined to social expectations such as taking on domestic responsibilities and working on the farms if necessary. They were also unprotected by laws even when they were abused and raped by men. Lynching was also common and they denied African American women any chance to prove their innocence from false claims. This fueled the movement founded by Ida B. Wells-Barnett.

Wells declared that an inherent problem to black women was that they were overall less invested in gaining the vote because the men and churches of their communities had not supported it. Once they did receive the right to vote, "nobody had attempted to instruct them in voting". The Alpha Suffrage Club attempted to amend this through means like canvassing neighborhoods and registering black women to vote.

African American women as a whole were stretched between civil rights movements: black men who had already gained the right to vote wanted them to stop focusing on suffrage and concentrate their efforts on issues surrounding race, while white suffragettes wanted the opposite. Neither group considered that black women's lives were affected by both their sex and their race.

=== White suffrage conflict ===
In the early years of the women's suffrage movement, abolition was something that brought many people together. Abolition and women's rights supporters worked together from the conclusion of the Civil War until the late 1800s. Frederick Douglass even used the famous abolitionist newspaper, the North Star, to advertise the 1848 Seneca Falls suffrage meeting. The American Equal Rights Association was formed in 1866 to win suffrage for all. This organization supported both women's and African American's voting rights at first, but with the passing of the 14th and 15th Amendments, there was a change in the group dynamics. Instead of this one organization, in 1868 there were two groups that had differing opinions about black men being given the right to vote. Black women were members of both groups for a time and then racism became a tool that many suffrage groups channeled.

As time went on, the main goal of the movement became the right to vote and in order to gain broad support throughout the United States, they used black voting rights as a type of scapegoat. Southern women were especially opposed to these black suffragettes and still held the belief that African Americans were inferior. Ida B. Wells, one of the founders of the Alpha Suffrage Club, was told she could only participate in the black section of the Woman Suffrage Parade because she was an African American woman. Despite the opposition, Wells still joined the white women marching and fighting for suffrage that day.

About a year later Wells founded a suffrage club that supported all women in the pursuit of the right to vote. Her organization advocated suffrage for all women, no matter their race or class, which was something that other popular woman suffrage groups did not push for at that time. The movement became divided, with one part of the movement supporting women's suffrage for all women and the other side only supporting white women suffrage. Women like Ida B. Wells felt that not granting all people the right to vote would hurt the overall cause and therefore the Alpha Suffrage Club supported all people's suffrage. This group distinction caused much conflict for ultimately no reason. The 19th Amendment was ratified in 1920 and granted suffrage to all women no matter their race, economic standing, or class. So although there was racism in the early fight for women's vote, the law produced was not discriminatory.

=== Woman Suffrage Procession of 1913 ===
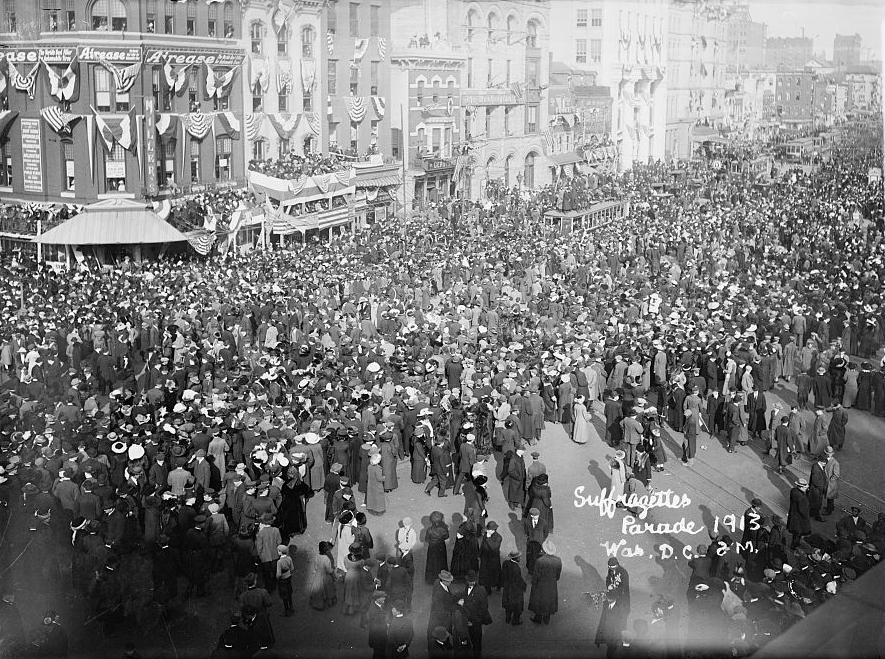
Woman Suffrage Procession, 1913

The Woman Suffrage Procession took place in Washington, D.C., on March 3, 1913, the day before the inauguration of Woodrow Wilson. Its intent was to demonstrate support of universal suffrage for women. One of Wells' first actions as the President of the Alpha Suffrage Club was to travel to Washington and march in the parade along with 65 club members, black women from Illinois. The constraints placed on their participation in the event illustrate the discrimination black women faced in the suffrage movement at that time.

The National American Woman Suffrage Association, which organized the event, feared offending southern white suffragists by allowing black and white women to march together. To avoid this possibility, the leader of the NAWSA instructed Wells to march at the end of the procession in a segregated section for African-American women. Wells refused to do as march organizers requested. Although Grace Wilbur Trout, the Chair of the Illinois delegation, warned Wells that her involvement in the march could lead to the exclusion of the Illinois group from the parade, she insisted that she would not move to the back, stating that "I shall not march at all unless I can march under the Illinois banner." Wells wanted to show the entire country that they were progressive enough to allow women of all races to stand against the hypocrisy of NAWSA's policies. However, no one listened to her except for Belle Squire and Virginia Brooks, two of her white colleagues.

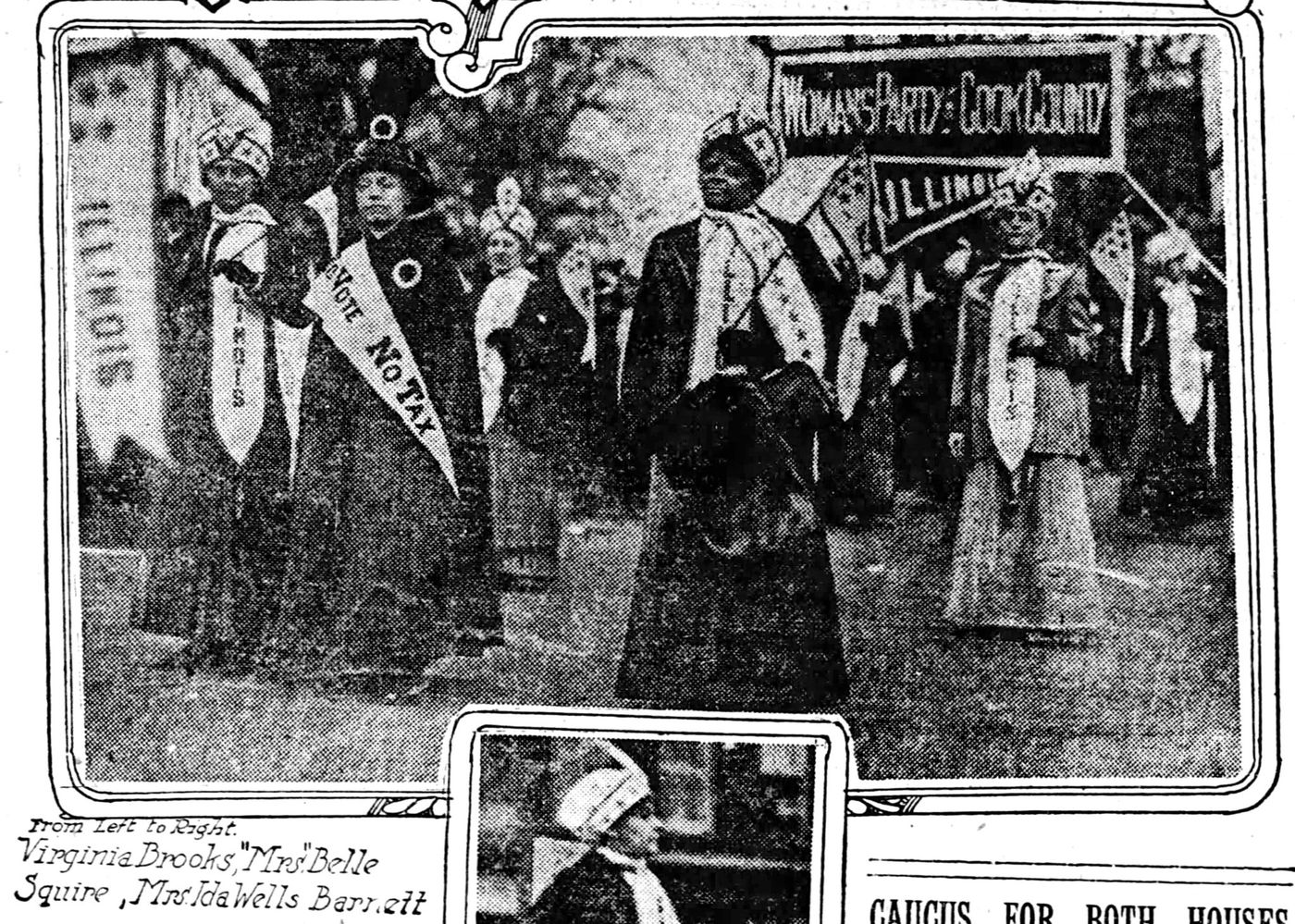
Ida B. Wells in the suffrage parade, 1913

Brooks and Squire ended up joining Wells-Barnett in protesting the segregation by race. The women offered to march with their friend at the back of the parade. In defiance, she joined the spectators until the Chicago delegation marched by and then joined them in the procession. A picture of this occurrence was in the Chicago Daily Tribune. A reporter happened to be standing at the spot when Wells-Barnett stepped out of the crowd and into the procession. However, only Wells-Barnett and not the other dozens of black women from Illinois marched with the Illinois delegation. The rest of the Alpha Suffrage Club marched at the back with the other black delegates. and Mary Church Terrell. The club paid for all of Wells' expenses to make it possible for her to march.

== Beliefs ==
The Alpha Suffrage Club had many beliefs and ideals that other suffrage groups lacked. The group was founded on the basic principle that all women, no matter their race, should receive the right to vote along with the men. There were other groups advocating for women's right to vote, but there was a lack of support for colored women suffrage. They were of the opinion that to fully enjoy suffrage equally, it was important to be involved in political happenings. Their Chicago-based group played an active role in legislation on voting, equality, and other civil rights matters. They supported philanthropy efforts in their community in order to strengthen colored people's standing in the city of Chicago. They were early supporters of equality for colored people on many levels. Ida B. Wells preached that the right to vote was not being properly used by men once equal suffrage was achieved. Now that suffrage was given to both men and women, their goal was to maximize the vote. They wanted equality and they wanted empowerment for colored women.

Besides universal suffrage, the club also fought for racial equality in other areas. They questioned why brave soldiers had to be seen by race instead of by their deeds.

== Illinois Equal Suffrage Act ==
Wells-Barnett formed the Alpha Suffrage Club in direct response seeing white women "working like beavers" to pass an Illinois granting limited suffrage to women in the State. Soon after returning from the Washington parade, Wells-Barnett led a congregation of several hundred black women through Springfield's Capitol building to lobby on behalf of the Illinois Equal Suffrage Act and against a handful of pending Jim Crow bills. The IESA was signed into law on June 26, 1913, making Illinois the first state in decades to grant suffrage. Carrie Chapman Catt wrote that "suffrage sentiment doubled over night". Combined with the successful Suffrage Parade of 1913 and ongoing Silent Sentinels protest, Illinois' bold step for suffrage reinvigorated the national push for a suffrage amendment.

A motorcar parade in Chicago celebrated the landmark legislation. On July 1, Wells-Barrnett was a parade marshall, riding with her daughter Alfreda down Michigan Avenue, but this honor was only noted in the Chicago Defender. Her prominent roll went unremarked in the other Chicago papers.

The IESA was the result of lobbying by national and local suffrage organizations and clubs. Social clubs at the time were strictly segregated by race and ethnicity. As one historian has noted, “Club women in Chicago established the most and largest gender-segregated suffrage clubs in the nation." The exclusion of black women motivated Wells and Squire to create the Alpha Suffrage Club in 2nd Ward, which had the highest percentage of African Americans in the city. It held at least one meeting at Bridewell Penitentiary in an attempt to interest prisoners in suffrage and give Club women experience in activism. The club had nearly 200 members in 1916, including well-known female suffrage activists Mary E. Jackson, Viola Hill, Vera Wesley Green, and Sadie L. Adams. Jane Addams was a regular speaker at the club.

As a result of the IESA, Illinois women were allowed to vote for presidential electors, mayor, aldermen and most other local offices. They were not, however, allowed to vote for members of Congress, Governor or State representatives, as universal suffrage for these offices required amending the state constitution.

== Election of Oscar De Priest ==
The Alpha Suffrage Club played an active and important role in Chicago politics, particularly in the primaries and 1915 general election for alderman in 2nd Ward. The Club developed a block system to canvas the ward to register African American Women to vote. ASC's efforts in 1914 registered 7,290 women in a ward with 16,237 registered men. In an early primary election the Club supported the independent black candidate William R. Cowen, who was not endorsed by the city Republican Party. Despite the canvassing efforts by African-American women on his behalf, he lost the election by only 352 votes. The Alpha Suffrage Club's influence, however, was quickly acknowledged by the press with the Chicago Defender, reporting that “. . .the women’s vote was a revelation to everyone...” In addition to press coverage, the Republican Party had noticed the club's influence. It sent two delegates to the club's meeting the day following the election, and encouraged the women to keep campaigning. They also promised that the Republicans would support an African-American candidate in the election of the next year.

After the primary election members of the club continued their work. They focused on communities with large percentages of African-Americans as they canvassed neighborhoods. They also held weekly meetings to discuss civic responsibilities, showed women how to use voting machines and trained women to act as precinct judges. They also distributed lists of voting locations in all wards of the city.

In the course of their organizing, the women's efforts met significant criticism. Men “jeered at them and told them they ought to be at home taking care of the babies.” Others accused them of “trying to take the place of men and wear the trousers.” Local newspapers stated their concerns of the women's door to door canvassing and the prospect of women “seeing all of the activities that might be going on.”

After the club's success in the 1914 primary, the Republican Party designated Oscar De Priest, as their candidate in the 2nd Ward, in the later city election for alderman. He ran against two white candidates and won. As the first black alderman in Chicago he was elected in 1914 to the Chicago City Council, and served from 1915 to 1917. The impact of the club's organizing was clear, as one third of the votes he received were cast by women. De Priest and the club had come to know each other well through his attending Club meetings throughout the elections. After his election De Priest acknowledged the work done by the women in the 2nd Ward who had been important in his success. News of the club's success traveled beyond the city. A black Indianapolis paper proudly reported on the election "of a Negro for alderman" due "in no small part" to the 1,093 votes cast by black women. De Priest served only one term as alderman after allegations of corruption, but De Priest's career continued and he later became the first African American to be elected to the U.S. Congress post-reconstruction era. However the influence of ACS in the Second Ward remained strong. Another black Alderman, Louis B. Anderson, succeeded De Priest cementing a change in Chicago's second ward.

== Alpha Suffrage Record ==
Volume 1 of the Alpha Suffrage Record

The Alpha Suffrage Club published the newsletter, the Alpha Suffrage Record, which was used to announce the formation of the club, to describe its activities and to extend its reach a larger group of African Americans in the city. It focused on the population of the 2nd Ward in the city, and gave the Club women a public political voice.

== Impacts of the Alpha Suffrage Club ==
The woman suffrage parade of 1913 legitimized the woman suffrage movement as a whole. The Alpha Suffrage Club and its protest against being forced to march in the back brought a spotlight to the fact that racism was also an issue even within an otherwise united movement. NAWSA wanted to secure white woman suffrage before moving on to African Americans, but the Alpha Suffrage Club and other suffrage associations pushed against that idea, and as a result the 19th amendment granted voting rights to all women, regardless of race.

The credibility of the club was recognized after the primary elections in 1914, when Republican delegates attended a club meeting and promised to choose a black nominee in exchange for the women's support in future campaigns. The crucial role the club played in electing Oscar DePriest yielded his support for women's voting rights, buoying the club's causes in the ensuing years, furthering their efforts to back their social reforms with political power.

Locally, the Alpha Suffrage Club started a system to canvas neighborhoods and increase community engagement through weekly meetings to educate people on their rights as a citizen. They were also able to register female voters through block by block canvassing. The protests and demonstrations efforts made by the club also brought pressure for the U.S. Congress to approve the 19th amendment on June 10, 1919, which came into effect on August 18, 1920.

== Notable members ==
- Ida B. Wells-Barnett, co-founder, president
- Belle Squire, co-founder and supported Wells-Barnett during the woman suffrage parade of 1913
- Virginia Brooks, co-founder and supported Wells-Barnett during the woman suffrage parade of 1913
- Mary E. Jackson, the first vice president of the club
- Sadie L. Williams, corresponding secretary
- Viola Hill, second vice president
- Vera Wesley Green, recording secretary
- Laura Beasley, treasurer
- Kizziah J. Bills (also known as Mrs. K. J. Bills), editor
- E.D. Wyatt
- W.N. Mills
- J.E. Hughes
- Bettiola Heloise Fortson, vice president

== See also ==
- African-American Woman Suffrage Movement
- Timeline of women's suffrage in the United States
- Woman's club movement
- Women's suffrage in the United States
