= Phyllis Terrell =

American suffragist and civil rights activist

Phyllis Terrell Langston
- Born: Phyllis Terrell; April 2, 1898; Washington, DC
- Died: August 21, 1989 (aged 91); Highland Beach, Maryland, U.S.
- Other name: Phyllis Goines
- Parent(s): Robert Heberton Terrell; Mary Church Terrell

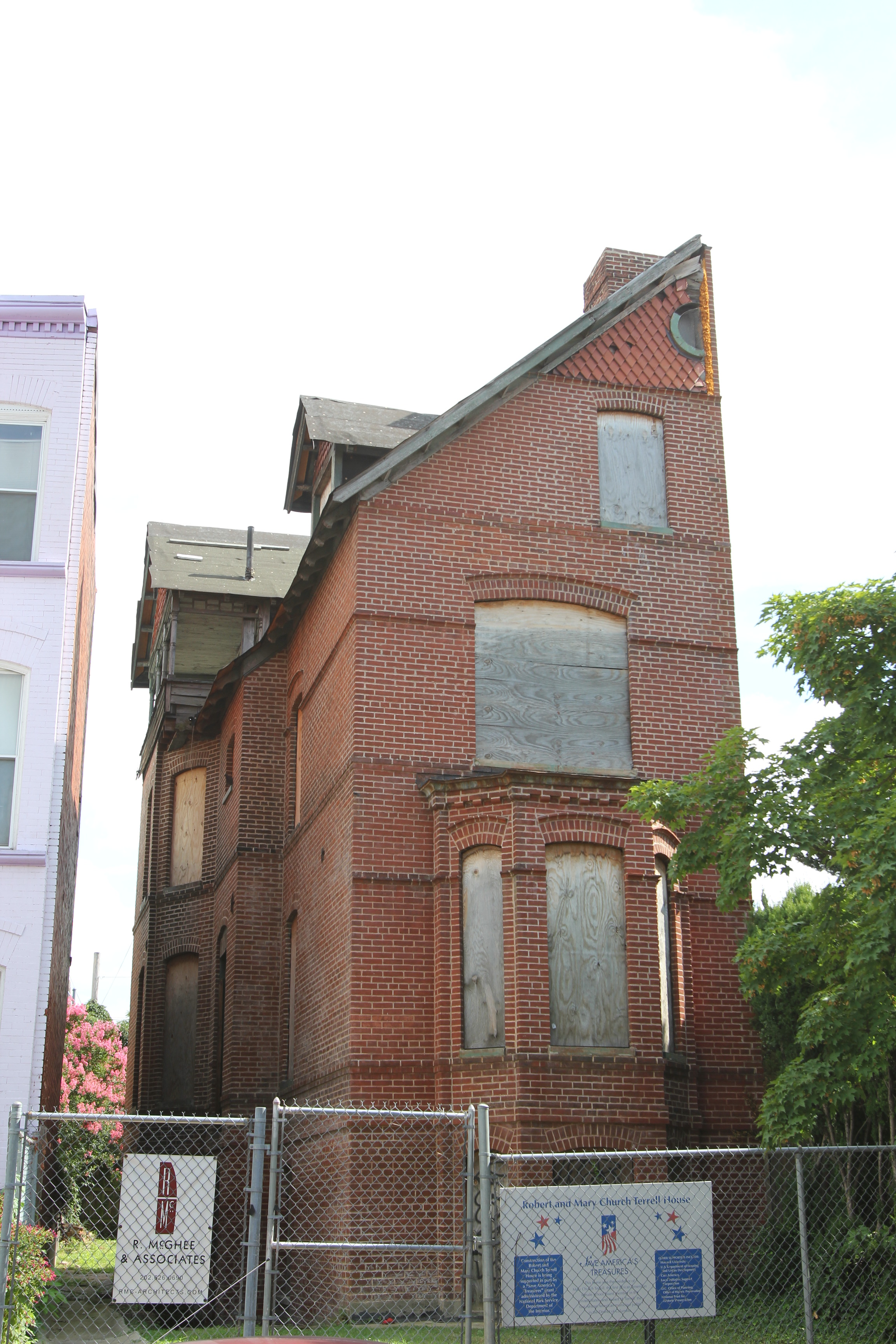
Mary Church Terrell House

Phyllis Terrell Langston (April 2, 1898 – August 21, 1989) was a suffragist and civil rights activist. She worked alongside her mother, Mary Church Terrell, in the National Association of Colored Women's Clubs and the White House pickets during demonstrations made by the National Woman's Party.

== Early life and education ==
Phyllis Terrell was born on April 2, 1898, in Washington, D.C., to Mary Church Terrell, an activist for civil rights and suffrage, and Robert Heberton Terrell, the first Black municipal court judge in Washington, D.C. She was named after Phyllis Wheatley, the first African-American author of a book of poetry. The family adopted Mary Terrell's ten-year-old niece, also named Mary, in 1905.

Terrell graduated from Wilberforce University and became a teacher. Terrell continued her studies at Howard University in the College of Music. She was one of the most promising students in the College of Music, commended for her natural talent at playing piano.

== Activism ==
The National Association of Colored Women, or NAWC, was founded in 1896 by black reformers like Sojourner Truth, Frances Ellen Watkins Harper, and Harriet Tubman. It eventually became the largest federation of local black women's clubs, and Mary Church Terrell, Terrell’s mother, became the first president. The NACW advocated to improve the lives of African Americans. Their motto is “Lifting as We Climb,” which embodies their mission of advocating for women’s rights along with improving the status of African Americans. Witnessing her mother's work prompted Terrell to join the National Association of Colored Women.

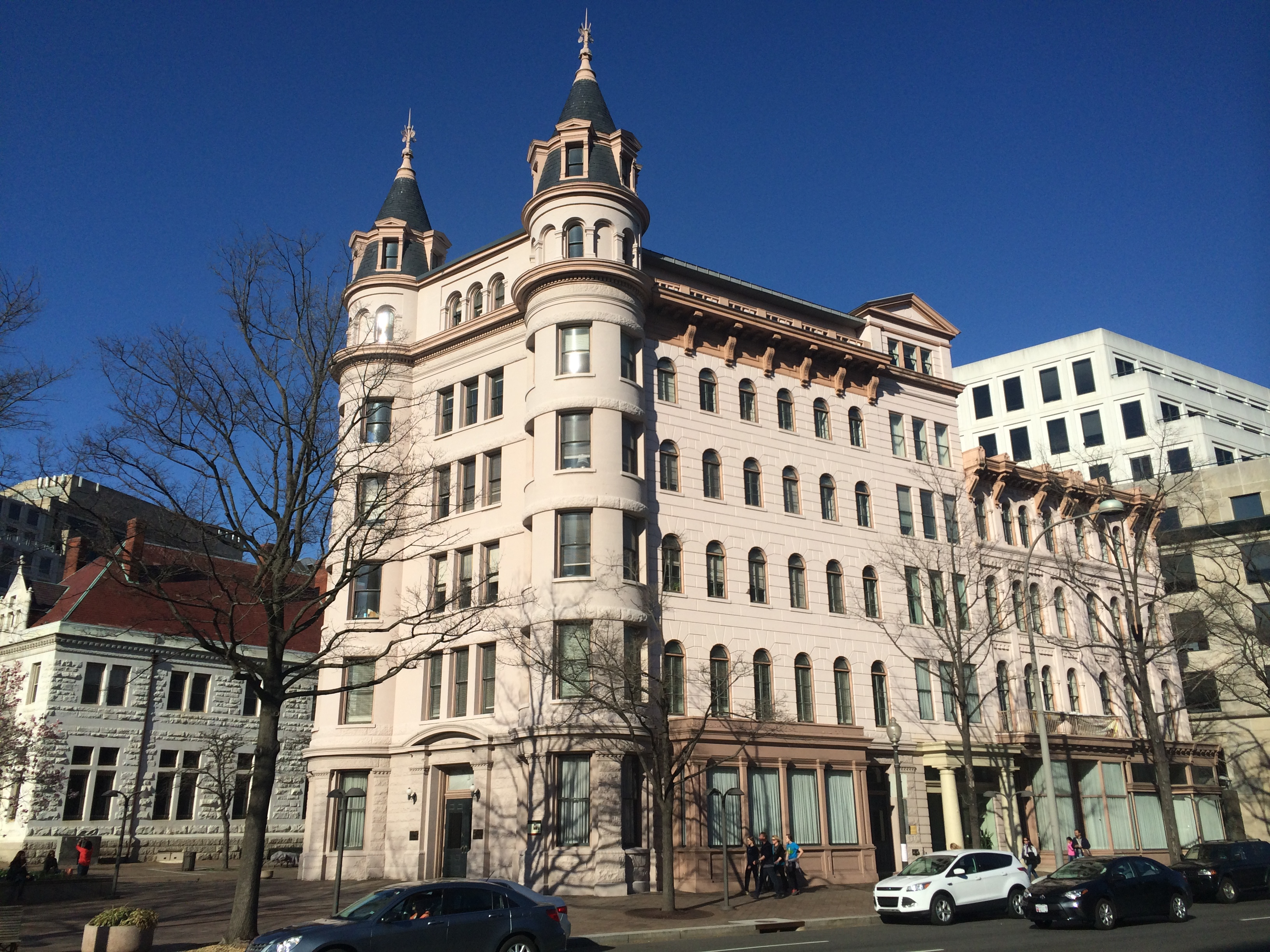
National Council of Negro Women Headquarters

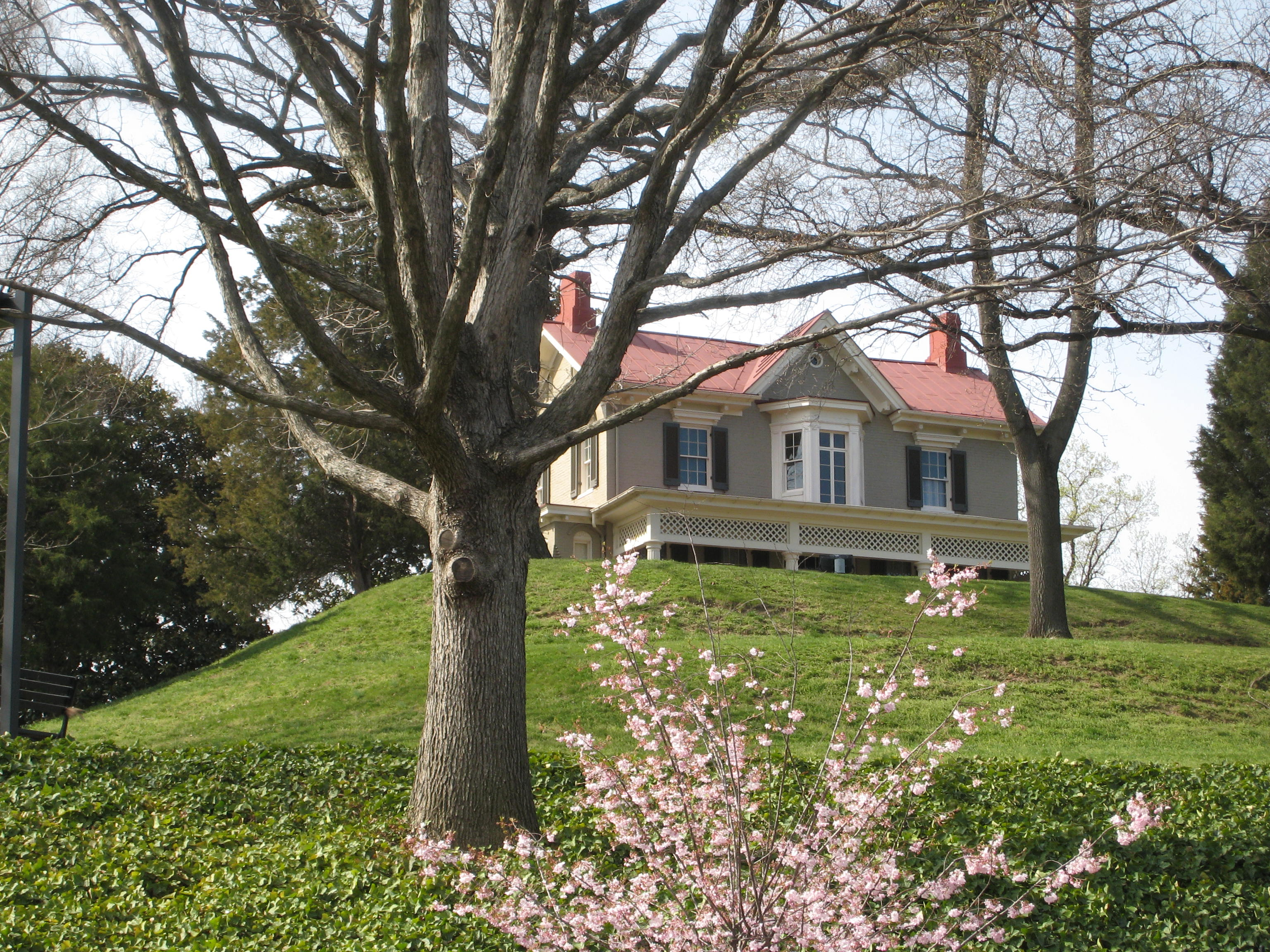
Frederick Douglass National Historic Site

Terrell, along with her mother, picketed the White House during the National Woman's Party demonstrations that called on President Woodrow Wilson to support a women's suffrage amendment. As Black women, Terrell and her mother were excluded from the vote when the Nineteenth Amendment to the United States Constitution was passed. However, Terrell and her mother joined the National Women’s Party to get Silent Sentinel pins for picketing the White House.

In August 1939, Terrell and her mother Mary visited San Francisco and Oakland on a tour of California. They visited the home of Irene Belle Ruggles, the president of the California Association of Colored Women and the Association of Colored Women of San Francisco. At that time, Terrell listened to her mother give a speech commending the hospitable people they met on their trip and the glories of Treasure Island.

Terrell became the postmaster for new generations of suffragists and civil rights organizations. In this role, she assisted historians and scholars regarding the plight of African Americans and worked closely with National Association of Colored Women's Clubs.

Terrell watched the launching of the SS Harriet Tubman in 1944 with a group of women from the National Council of Negro Women.

== Frederick Douglass Home ==
In 1962, Phyllis Terrell succeeded in getting the Frederick Douglass Home in Washington, D.C., declared a National Shrine by an Act of Congress. The Terrells' summer home on the Chesapeake Bay in Highland Beach, Maryland, was next door to the home that Major Charles R. Douglass built for his father, Frederick Douglass, in 1893. Highland Beach was a regular summer vacation destination for educator Booker T. Washington; poets Langston Hughes and Paul Laurence Dunbar; pioneering Black Congressmen John Mercer Langston and Blanche Kelso Bruce, and generations of the Douglass family.

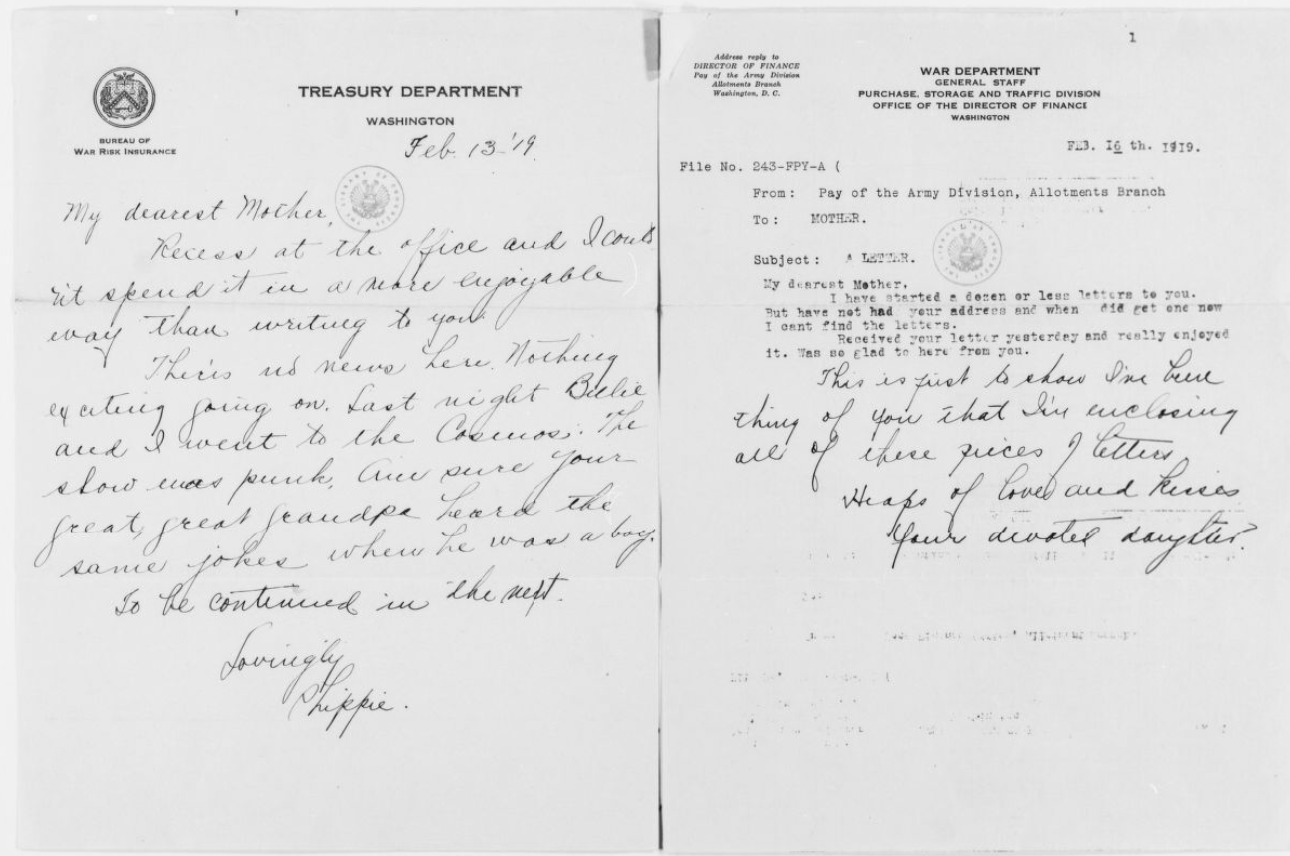
1919 Letter from Phyllis Terrell to mother Mary Church Terrell

== Personal life ==
Terrell married first Lieutenant William C. Goines in 1930, and later married Lathall DeWitt Langston. Terrell did not have any of her own children. However, her second husband had two sons and one daughter.

Phyllis and her mother, suffragist Mary Church Terrell, wrote to one another for almost 40 years. In her letters, Terrell addressed her mother as "My dearest mother," and signed the letters "Your little daughter, Phyllis" or "Lovingly, Phippie".

Terrell died on August 21, 1989, at her summer home in Highland Beach, Maryland, just as her mother had in July 1954.

== Legacy ==
=== Suffs ===
Phyllis Terrell was a secondary figure in the 2024 musical Suffs along with her mother, Mary Church Terrell as important viewpoints to the gaps in the white led suffrigist movements as well as their active involvement in both female and black rights movements. She is quoted in using her mother's coined phrase 'Lifting as We Climb,' the motto of the NACW. She is played by Laila Drew in the PBS Great Performance stage recording of the broadway musical.
