= Jane Eleanor Datcher =

American botanist and teacher

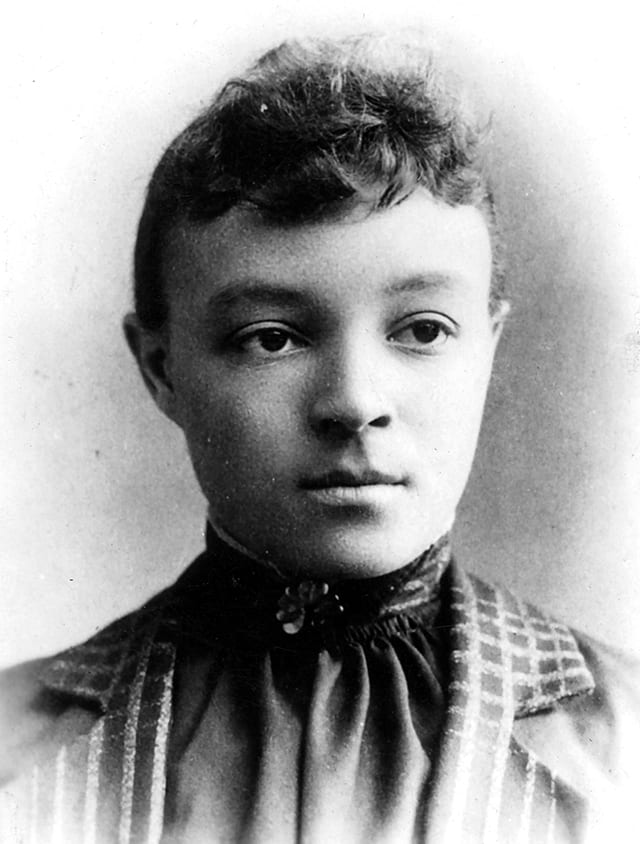
- Born: 1868; Washington, D.C., U.S.
- Died: February 24, 1934 (aged 65–66); Washington, D.C., U.S.
- Education: Cornell University
- Scientific career
- Fields: Botany
- Workplaces: Howard Medical School; Dunbar High School
- Thesis: A biological sketch of Hepatica triloba and Hepatica acutiloba (1890)
- Notable students: Robert Percy Barnes

Jane Eleanor "Nellie" Datcher (1868 – February 24, 1934) was an American botanist and the first African-American woman to earn an advanced degree from Cornell University in 1890. She worked as a teacher at Dunbar High School in Washington, D.C. and was a founding member of the Collegiate Alumnae Club.

== Biography ==
Jane Eleanor Datcher was born 1868 and raised in Washington, D.C., the daughter of Samuel and Mary Victoria Cook Datcher. Her maternal grandfather, Rev. John Francis Cook, Sr., was the founding pastor of the Fifteenth Street Presbyterian Church in Washington, D.C.

=== Education ===
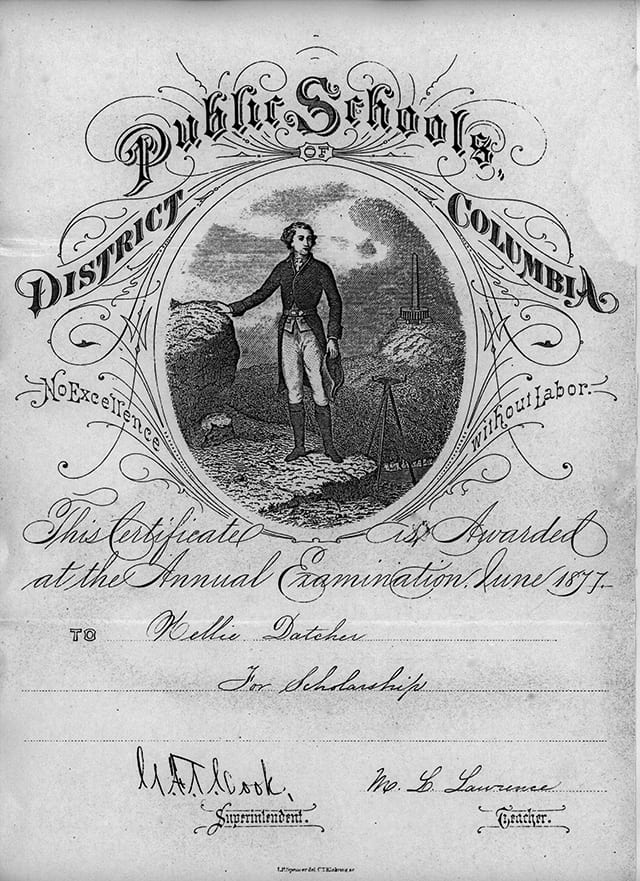
Certificate of scholarship earned by Datcher, 1877

Datcher attended both public and private schools run by members of the Black community in Washington, D.C. In 1877, she earned a certificate for her academic achievement from the Public Schools of the District of Columbia. In 1886, Jane enrolled at Cornell University at the age of 19 with her cousin, Charles Chauveau Cook. It was the only school that would educate them both. She obtained her Bachelor of Science honors degree from Cornell in 1890 for her research on the species Hepatica triloba and Hepatica acutiloba, which included a handwritten biological sketch. She was among the first three African-Americans to graduate from Cornell, along with her cousin Charles and George Washington Fields. Because of her excellent scholarship during her years at Cornell, Datcher had the honor of sitting in the center of the front row in the Cornell Class of 1890 graduation photo.

Over 20 of Datcher’s relatives attended Cornell. Her cousin, Charles C. Cook, eventually joined the staff at Howard University as a professor and head of the English Department. Datcher went on to attend Howard Medical School from 1893 to 1894.

=== Later years and legacy ===
After graduating from Cornell, Datcher helped form the Collegiate Alumnae Club (later part of the Colored Women's League), an organization run by Mary Church Terrell as a resource for educated Black women. This group met for the first time in Washington D.C. in the summer of 1892 to confer about improving the conditions of black children, women and the urban poor. Other notable women in attendance include Anna Julia Cooper, Helen Appo Cook, Ida Bell Wells-Barnett, Charlotte Forten Grimké, Mary Jane Patterson, Evelyn Shaw. Although the founders were opposed to racial segregation, they wanted to open membership to graduates of Howard and other so-called "negro colleges," who were denied membership in the predominately White Association of Collegiate Alumnae.

Datcher taught chemistry at Dunbar High School until soon before her death in 1934. Dunbar was known as the best high school for black students in the area, and parents would bus their students from surrounding towns just to attend the school and receive a better education. This school gave Datcher the ability to teach black students at a high academic level, while also earning parity pay with Washington's white school teachers.

== Publications ==
- Datcher, Jane Eleanor (1890). A biological sketch of Hepatica triloba and Hepatica acutiloba. Cornell University.
