= Mary Church Terrell House =

- U.S. National Register of Historic Places
- U.S. National Historic Landmark
- U.S. Historic district – Contributing property
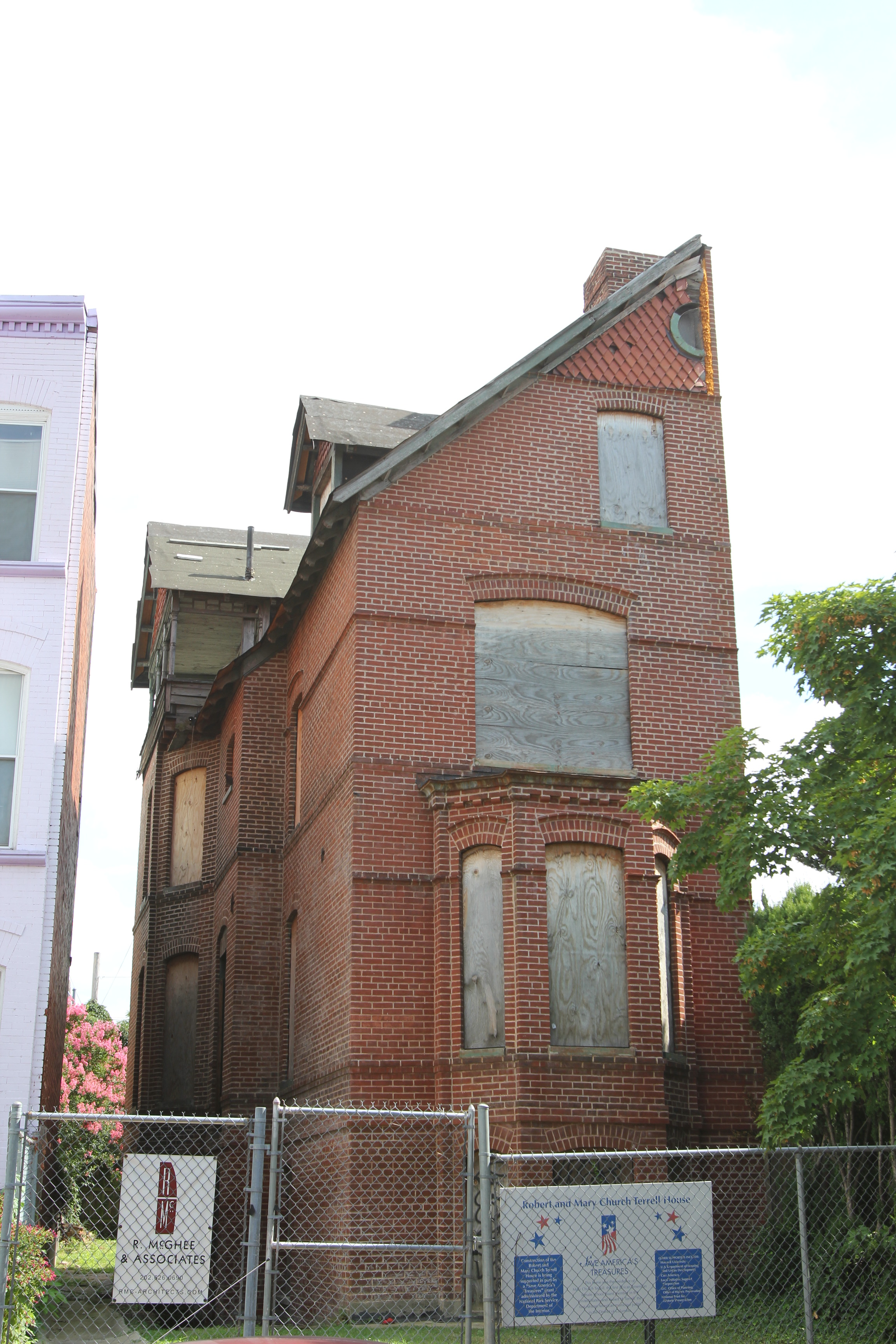
- Mary Church Terrell House, July 2012, awaiting restoration

- Location within Washington, D.C. Location within the United States
- Location: 326 T St., NW, Washington, D.C.
- Coordinates: 38°54′56″N 77°1′0″W
- Built: 1899
- Architectural style: Late Victorian
- Part of: LeDroit Park Historic District (ID74002165)
- NRHP reference No.: 75002055

Significant dates
- Added to NRHP: May 15, 1975
- Designated NHL: May 15, 1975
- Designated CP: February 25, 1974

The Mary Church Terrell House is a historic house at 326 T Street NW in Washington, D.C. It was a home of civil rights leader Mary Church Terrell (1863–1954), the first black woman to serve on an American school board, and a leading force in the desegregation of public accommodations in the nation's capital. Her home in the LeDroit Park section of Washington, DC was declared a National Historic Landmark in 1975. The building is a contributing property in the LeDroit Park Historic District.

== Description ==
The Mary Church Terrell House stands in Washington's LeDroit Park neighborhood, southeast of Howard University, on the south side of T Street between 3rd and 4th Streets. It is a 2 1/2-story brick half-house, set on a nearly full-height raised basement. The front facade has a single bay, consisting of a polygonal window bay at the basement and first level, and a large segmented-arch window on the second floor. A smaller window is located in the half-gable above, with half of a round window set in a bed of Victorian shingles at the peak. The main entrance is via a porch on the left side; the right side of the building is a plain brick party wall for a non-existent right side.

== History ==
Mary Church Terrell was born in Tennessee and educated at Oberlin College. She became a school teacher in Washington 1887, and married Robert Heberton Terrell, a prominent African-American attorney, in 1891. She stopped working at that time, but remained engaged in efforts to improve the district's schools. In 1895 she was appointed to the district's school board, the first African-American woman in the nation to sit on such a board. She served two terms, seeking to improve the quality of the district schools. She was a founder and first president of the National Association of Colored Women, and supported broad-based efforts at achieving women's suffrage. In the 1950s she was involved in efforts to challenge the district's lack of enforcement of public accommodation laws originally passed in the 1870s, participating in actions resulting in the favorable District of Columbia v. John R. Thompson Co. decision.

== Restoration ==
After the house was unoccupied for a number of years, its degraded condition was apparent to even a casual observer. In the summer of 2008 restoration was begun, primarily supported by a grant from the National Park Service Save America's Treasures program. Additional support came from Howard University, the US Department of Housing and Urban Development, the DC Office of Planning and the National Trust for Historic Preservation.

Based on outside observation, it appears the brick work was repaired and re-pointed, major structural problems were addressed on outside porches, the windows' support and trim were fixed and covered properly using plywood, and the roof was repaired. This work was completed by architect Ronnie McGhee, a Howard University architecture professor and alumnus, in the summer of 2009.

In 2018, Howard University received an African American Civil Rights (AACR) grant from the National Park Service's Historic Preservation Fund for a full restoration of the house, which was completed by Ronnie McGhee in 2024.

== Additional information ==
The home is privately owned by Howard University and not open to the public. As of fall 2024, tenants were expected to occupy the building beginning in 2025.

== See also ==
- Fort Brown
- List of National Historic Landmarks in Washington, D.C.
- National Register of Historic Places listings in the upper NW Quadrant of Washington, D.C.
