= Margaret Una Poché =

American educator (1912–1982)

President of the National Association of University Women
- In office 1974–1978
- Preceded by: Odessa Wright Farrell
- Succeeded by: Nettie S. Manning

Personal details
- Born: 1912 New Orleans, Louisiana, U.S.
- Died: February 12, 1982 (aged 69–70) New Orleans, Louisiana, U.S.
- Spouse: Leo Maurice King (m. 1937)
- Education: Xavier University of Louisiana; Columbia University
- Occupation: Educator, academic administrator

Margaret Una Poché (1912 – February 12, 1982) was an American educator and academic administrator who served as president of the National Association of University Women.

== Early life and education ==
Margaret Una Poché was born in 1912 in Louisiana, the daughter of Auguste Paul Poché and Rose Dugas. She attended local public schools and graduated from Xavier University of Louisiana, where she received a bachelor's degree. She later received a masters degree in early childhood education from Columbia University, and completed additional advance study in supervision at UC Berkeley and Louisiana State University.

== Career ==
After college, Poché began working as a teacher (and later principal) of Thomy Lafon Elementary School, and later as principal of McDonogh No. 3 in the New Orleans Public School System. Beginning in 1964, she served as principal of the Valena C. Jones Elementary School in New Orleans.

In the early 1970s, Poché served on the constitution committee, executive committee, and as second vice president of the National Association of University Women, and was elected as the organization's president from 1974 to 1978. In 1976, she was appointed as a delegate to the inaugural Governor's Conference on Women, hosted by Louisiana Governor Edwin Edwards. Poch was also an active leader in the YWCA, a board member of the Girl Scouts of the USA, and a board member of the New Orleans Chapter of the American Red Cross.

== Death ==
Poché died on February 12, 1982.

== Works ==
- Women–Pilots of Change (1974)
