= Sara Winifred Brown =

African American teacher and doctor

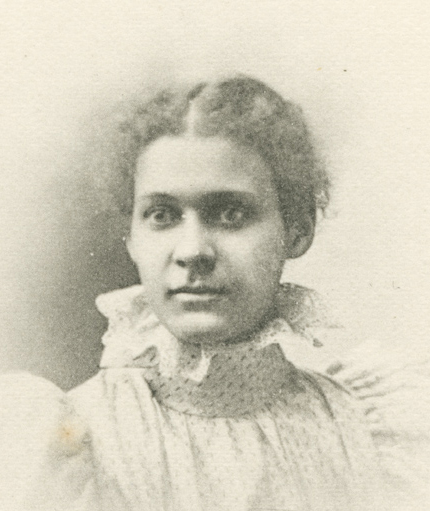
- Cornell Senior Photograph of Sara Winifred Brown, Class of 1897.
- Born: 1868; Winchester, Virginia
- Died: 1948 (aged 79–80)
- Education: Hampton University; Cornell University; Howard University
- Occupations: Physician, professor

Sara Winifred Brown (1868–1948) was an African American teacher and medical doctor. She worked in disaster relief and gynecology. In 1910, she helped to found the group that would later become the National Association of University Women, and in 1924 was the first woman to serve as an alumni trustee of Howard University.

== Early life ==
Sara Winifred Brown was born in Winchester, Virginia.

== Education ==
Brown attended Hampton University, then called Hampton Normal and Agriculture Institute, graduating with honors. She taught English in Washington, D.C., then took a leave of absence to attend Cornell University in 1894. At Cornell, she would become the first African American woman to graduate from the University.

She lived at Sage College dormitory, which three decades later changed its policy and barred residency to women of color. At Cornell, she became interested in biology, graduating with a BS in biology in 1897. She returned to DC and taught biology. She then enrolled in Howard University, receiving her MD in 1904. She became a member of Alpha Kappa Alpha sorority.

== Career and family ==
After receiving her MD from Howard, she entered medical practice but continued to pursue her educational interests in sociology and anthropology. In 1908, Howard University hired her to lecture on gynecology, and she continued to practice medicine and teach high school biology. In 1910, she joined in the founding of the College Alumnae Club, which came to be called the National Association of College Women, and is now known as the National Association of University Women. During World War I, she was one of 50 women chosen by the Women's War Work Council to be part of the "Flying Squadron". In 1924, she was elected to the board of Howard University, the first woman to serve as an alumni trustee. In 1927, she joined a Red Cross relief effort to assist victims of severe flooding in Mississippi and Louisiana. In 1930, she joined a Gold Star Mothers pilgrimage to France. She was struck by a bus in 1948 and died as a result of her injuries.

== Legacy ==
The United States Department of Health and Human Services lists her as an African American Pioneer in Health Care. In 1950, her brother, Dr. John William Brown, donated $40,000 to the United Order of Friendship, a group led by Dr. T.R.M. Howard, which renamed its Friendship Clinic in Mound Bayou, Mississippi as the Sara Winifred Brown Memorial Hospital. In 2010, as part of their Centennial celebration, the National Association of University Women planted a tree and placed a plaque to honor her founding efforts.
