= Colored Women's League =

African-American woman's club in Washington, D.C.

- Abbreviation: CWL
- Merged into: National Association of Colored Women
- Formation: June 1892; 134 years ago
- Founders: Anna J. Cooper; Helen Appo Cook; Mary Church Terrell; Ida B. Wells; Charlotte Forten Grimké; Mary Jane Patterson; Evelyn Shaw; Jane Eleanor Datcher; others
- Dissolved: July 21, 1896; 130 years ago
- Type: Woman's club; coalition
- Location: Washington, D.C., U.S.
- Members: 113 organizations
- President: Helen Appo Cook

The Colored Women's League (CWL) of Washington, D.C., was a woman's club, organized by a group of African-American women in June 1892, with Helen Appo Cook as president. The primary mission of this organization was the national union of colored women. In 1896, the Colored Women's League and the Federation of Afro-American Women merged to form the National Association of Colored Women, with Mary Church Terrell as the first president.

== History ==
In June 1892, a group of several prominent black women in Washington, D.C., met together to discuss creating a club devoted to improving the conditions of black children, women and the urban poor. Some of these women were Anna J. Cooper, Helen Appo Cook, Mary Church Terrell, Ida B. Wells, Charlotte Forten Grimké, Mary Jane Patterson, Evelyn Shaw, and Jane Eleanor Datcher. Helen Appo Cook was elected the first president. The Colored Women's League was a coalition of 113 organizations, and the goal of national unity was at the forefront of the club's objectives. In a letter written in 1894 to The Woman's Era, the first national newspaper published by and for African American women, Cook reported a few accomplishments of the league. These included: hosting a series of public lectures for girls at local high schools and Howard University, raising $1,935 towards a home for the league, creating classes for German, English Literature, and hygiene, and establishing a sewing school and mending bureau with 88 students and ten teachers. Mary Church Terrell also provided updates about the CWL's efforts to this newspaper. According to historian Fannie Barrier Williams, this organization had the largest membership of any African American women's club in the country.

=== Mergers ===
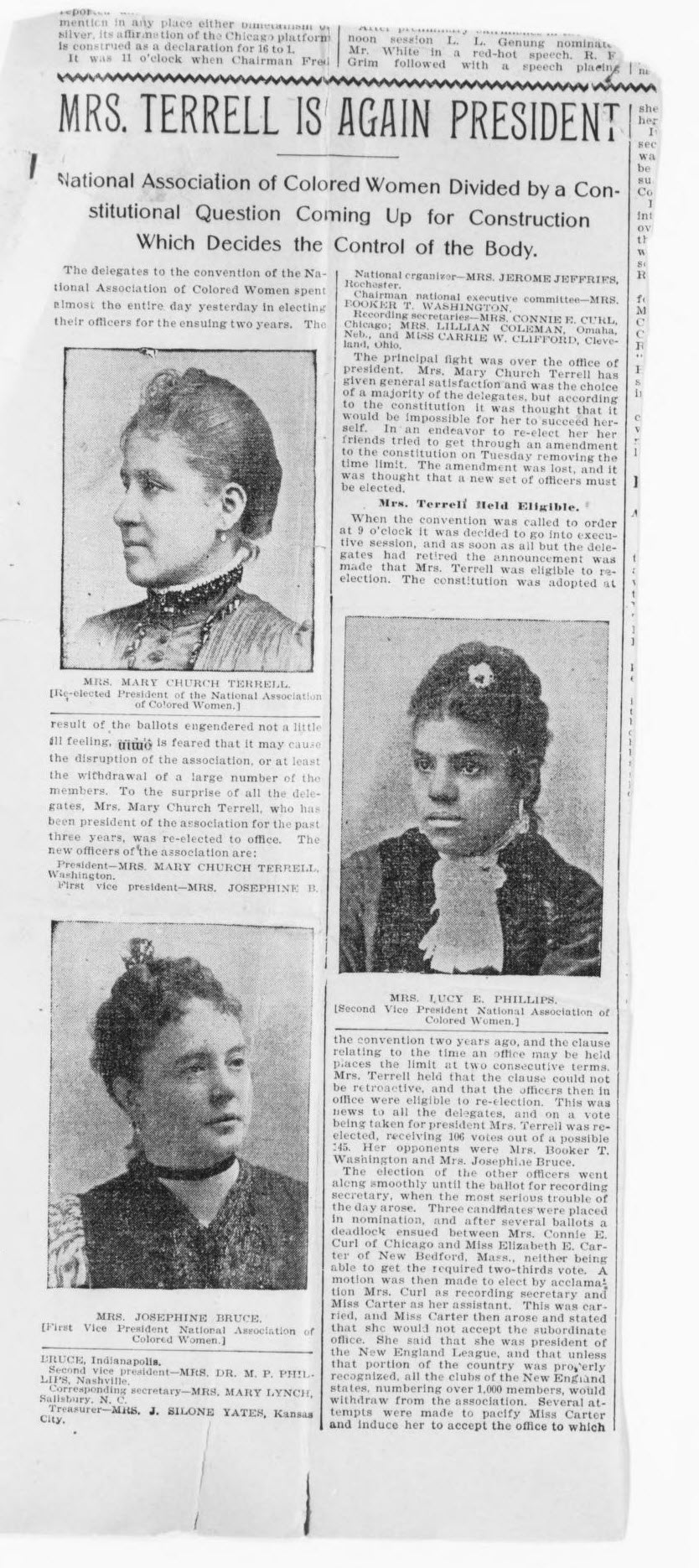
Newspaper article on Terrell's re-election as president

Although the primary goal of the CWL was national unity for colored women, this goal was not reached until July 21, 1896 when the National Association of Colored Women was formed as a result of the merging of the Colored Women's League and the National Federation of Afro-American Women. The merging of the two organizations was publicly debated in the black community. Many newspapers, including the Leavenworth Herald, published opinions about the merge in their newspapers. The Colored Women's League initially declined to join the National Federation of Afro-American Women because President Cook did not have the authority to commit the league. However, Josephine St. Pierre Ruffin's appeal to protect the reputation of black women influenced the political agenda of the CWL. Ruffin's appeal was composed in response to an editorial published by a Southern white journalist, in which the author ridiculed the moral character of black women. To combat the widespread influence of negative stereotypes of black women, Margaret Murray Washington, the president of the National Federation of Afro-American Women and Helen A. Cook began making plans to discuss consolidating their two organizations. After the merger of the Colored Women's League and the National Federation of Afro-American Women, Mary Church Terrell was named the first president of the newly formed National Association of Colored Women.

=== Rivalries ===
Both organizations, the Colored Women's League and the Federation of Afro-American Women, had similar objectives in mind: advancing the conditions for black women, children, and underprivileged. However, prior to merging, these organizations did not always see eye-to-eye. The biggest factor contributing to this rivalry was the debate about which organization was the first to be officially recognized as a national organization. Mary Church Terrell, the first president of the NACW, explains that "although the CWL was the first to suggest there should be a national organization," the first organization of black women to actually assemble nationally was the National Federation of Afro-American Women.

After the creation of the NACW, the contest for leadership of the national organization created another short rivalry. Each organization was represented by seven delegates in the election process, so ties of 7-7 made the voting process difficult. Eventually, at the age of thirty-three and pregnant, Mary Church Terrell of the Colored Women's League was named the first president of the NACW.

=== Criticism ===
Many members of the league, especially those in leadership positions, had high social standings. In fact, some even called members of the league "female aristocrats of color". Therefore, the league faced several critiques. Some argued that the ideology of racial uplift was classist. Nevertheless, the success of the CWL inspired other black women to become aware of the possibility of creating a united front for themselves and created their own clubs.

== National League of Colored Women ==
On July 21, 1896, the Colored Women’s League merged with the National Federation of Afro-American Women to form the National League of Colored Women. The new organization was created in Washington D.C. where Mary Church Terrell was elected as its first president. It extended the Colored Women's League's objectives to a national agenda for uplifting black women, as follows:

- To unite colored women nationally.
- To improve conditions of black women locally and nationally.
- To collect all facts obtainable to show the "moral, intellectual, industrial and social growth and attainments of our people, to foster unity of purpose, to consider and determine methods which will promote the interests of colored people [in every direction]".
- To create a kindergarten for the black community.
- To educate the youth.
- To teach evening classes in literature, language, and other subjects.
