= Odessa Wright Farrell =

American educator (1908–2001)

President of the National Association of University Women
- In office 1969–1974
- Preceded by: Portia C. Bullock
- Succeeded by: Margaret Una Poché

Personal details
- Born: Odessa Wright; October 26, 1908 Kansas City, Missouri, U.S.
- Died: December 9, 2001 (aged 93) St. Louis, Missouri, U.S.
- Spouse: Rowan Farrell
- Occupation: Educator, historian, author

Odessa Wright Farrell (October 26, 1908 – December 9, 2001) was an American educator, historian, and author who served as president of the National Association of University Women.

== Early life and education ==
Odessa Wright was born on October 26, 1908, in Kansas City, Missouri. She was raised in St. Louis and attended local public schools.

She graduated from the Sumner Normal School and received her State of Missouri teacher certification, and later earned her baccalaureate degree at Stowe Teachers College. She received a master's degree from the University of Iowa and pursued additional graduate studies at the Wharton School of Finance.

== Career ==
Wright Farrell started her career as a teacher at Charles Sumner High School in 1932 and worked in St. Louis Public Schools for over forty years. By the late 1960s, she worked in the curriculum division of the St. Louis Board of Education. Wright Farrell served as president of the National Association of University Women from 1969 to 1974. In 1971, she testified before the U.S. Senate Subcommittee on Employment, Manpower and Poverty regarding extending the Economic Opportunity Act.

She also taught on the weekends at the Carter G. Woodson School for Negro History, and was a proponent of teaching African American history in public schools. She cited Herman Dreer as an early inspiration to her. Wright Farrell was credited for her efforts to support inter-district busing and help desegregate the public school system in St. Louis.

In 1970, Wright Farrell was appointed by President Richard Nixon as a delegate to the White House Conference on Education.

Wright Farrell was an active participant in the NAACP, including serving as education chair, and served as president of the board of the Heritage House Development Corporation.

Later in life, Wright Farrell was an active officer in the Missouri Retired Teachers Association and was state coordinator of the AARP's voter education efforts.

== Death ==
Wright Farrell died in 2001 at the age of 93.

== Works ==
- History of Saint James African Methodist Episcopal Church (1986)

== Awards and honors ==
In 1988, Wright Farrell was named to the Charles Sumner High School Hall of Fame.

In 1990, Wright Farrell was named by the Missouri Department of Elementary and Secondary Education as a Pioneer in Education inductee. In 1995, she was named as a Distinguished Alumni by Harris–Stowe State University.

In 2001, during the Harris–Stowe State University Commencement Convocation Program, Wright Farrell was awarded an honorary Doctor of Humane Letters.
