= Lillian Ward McDaniel =

American educator (1902–1981)

President of the National Association of University Women
- In office 1961–1965
- Preceded by: Hilda A. Davis
- Succeeded by: Portia C. Bullock

Personal details
- Born: Lillian Ward; February 4, 1902; Richmond, Virginia, U.S.
- Died: January 29, 1981 (aged 78); Richmond, Virginia, U.S.
- Spouse: Leonard McDaniel
- Children: 3
- Occupation: Educator, activist

Lillian Ward McDaniel (February 4, 1902 – January 29, 1981) was an American educator who served as president of the National Association of University Women.

== Early life and education ==
Lillian Ward was born on February 4, 1902, in Richmond, Virginia. She graduated from Armstrong High School, received a bachelor's degree at Virginia Union University, and received a master's degree in child development from Columbia University.

== Career ==
In 1923, she began working as a teacher at Dunbar Elementary School, a segregated public school in Richmond. She later taught at Blackwell Elementary School and Franklin Elementary School. She retired from teaching in 1970.

=== Activism ===
McDaniel was active in various causes, including education, civil rights, and religion. She was the president of the Women's Fellowship Bible Class program in Richmond, and served as an officer with the National Council of Negro Women. McDaniel was active in the Virginia Teachers Association, including serving as a district president and member of the organization's executive council. She also served as an appointed member of the Virginia Educational Advisory Board.

From March 27 to April 2, 1960, McDaniel was a delegate to the White House Conference on Children and Youth.

McDaniel was an active member of the National Association of College Women (now known as the National Association of University Women), including serving as the organization's first vice president and later as its president from 1961 to 1965. In the role, McDaniel was an advocate for women's educational and vocational opportunities, including affirmative action programs.

In 1969, McDaniel served as chairperson of the National Association of University Women's national convention.

== Death ==
McDaniel died on January 29, 1981, at the age of 78.

== Awards and honors ==
In 2002, McDaniel was posthumously inducted as a Virginia Women in History honoree.

McDaniel is the namesake of the National Association of University Women's Lillian Ward McDaniel Scholarship.
