= National Association of University Women =

Nonprofit organization

- Formation: 1910; 116 years ago
- Founders: Mary Church Terrell; Sara Winifred Brown; Mary Cromwell; Nancy Fairfax Brown
- Headquarters: Washington, D.C., U.S.
- Key people: Betty W. Wilkerson (President)
- Website: nauw1910.org

The National Association of University Women, Inc. (NAUW), founded in 1910, is a non-profit organization with a mission to "serve women, youth, and the disadvantaged in our communities and in developing countries by addressing educational issues, and strategically partnering with allied organizations."

== History ==
The organization was founded in 1910 in Washington, D.C., with the original name of the College Alumnae Club. The organization's original founders were Mary Church Terrell, Nancy Fairfax Brown, Sara Winifred Brown, and Mary Cromwell.

In 1923, the organization was expanded and renamed as the National Association of College Women (NACW). In 1974, the organization updated its charter and was renamed to the National Association of University Women (NAUW).

The organization is composed of African American college and university women graduates and is affiliated with the National Council of Negro Women, National Association for the Advancement of Colored People, United Negro College Fund, National Coalition for Literacy, and the American Council on Education.

== Presidents ==
Below is a partial list of presidents of the organization since 1910.

1. Mary Church Terrell – 1910–1912 (as the College Alumnae Club)
2. Sara Winifred Brown – 1917–1919
3. Lucy D. Slowe – 1924–1929 (first president of the organization as NACW)
4. Juanita H. Thomas – 1929–1933
5. Vivian J. Cook – 1933–1936
6. Helen B. Grosley – 1936–1939
7. Hilda A. Davis – 1939–1944 (served two non-consecutive terms)
8. Alice Taylor Chandler – 1944–1949
9. Flemmie Kittrell – 1949–1951
10. Inez B. Brewer – 1951–1953
11. Thelma Taylor Williams – 1953–1957
12. Hilda A. Davis – 1957–1961 (served two non-consecutive terms)
13. Lillian W. McDaniel – 1961–1965
14. Portia C. Bullock – 1965–1969
15. Odessa Wright Farrell – 1969–1974 (first president of the organization as NAUW)
16. Margaret Una Poché – 1974–1978
17. Nettie S. Manning – 1978–1982
18. Rhebena T. Castleberry – 1982–1986
19. Carrie A. Haynes – 1986–1990
20. Ruth R. Corbin – 1990–1994
21. Phyllis J. Eggleston – 1994–1998
22. Ezora J. Proctor – 1998–2002
23. Lenore Gall – 2002–2006
24. Ollie Johnson – 2006–2010
25. Dolores Y. Owens – 2010–2014
26. Evelyn L. Wright – 2014–2018
27. Mary E. Bentley LaMar – 2018–2022
28. Betty W. Wilkerson – 2022–2026
29. Annette Burtin - 2026-Present
