= Mary Jane Patterson =

American educator (1840–1894)

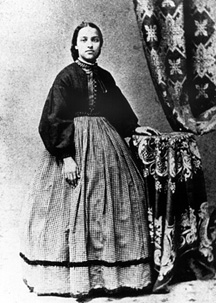
- Patterson in 1862
- Born: September 12, 1840; Raleigh, North Carolina, US
- Died: September 24, 1894 (aged 54); Washington, D.C., US
- Education: Oberlin College (BA)
- Occupations: Teacher; Principal

Mary Jane Patterson (September 12, 1840 – September 24, 1894) was an American educator born to a previously enslaved mother and a freeborn father. She is notable because she is claimed to be the first African-American woman to receive a B.A degree. In 1862, she completed the four-year 'gentlemen's course' at Oberlin College. She first taught at the Philadelphia's Institute for Colored Youth. She then went on to teach at the Preparatory High School for Colored Youth, known today as Dunbar High School, in Washington, D.C. She became its first Black principal. She was a lifelong advocate for Black education, helping to found the Colored Woman's League which later became the National Association of Colored Women. A humanitarian, Patterson also devoted time and money to Black institutions in Washington, D.C.

== Early life and education ==
Mary Jane Patterson was born on September 12, 1840. She was the oldest of Henry Patterson and Emeline (or Emmeline) Eliza (Taylor) Patterson's children. There is conflicting data on how many siblings she had, but most sources cite between seven and ten. Henry Patterson worked as a bricklayer and plasterer. Although some accounts relate that he gained his freedom from slavery in 1852, he was in fact freeborn. Having bought his enslaved intended wife, Emeline, he petitioned to emancipate her in 1838 and again, successfully, in 1840. The couple waited to have children until after Emeline was freed, in 1840 or 1841. Their eldest child, Mary Jane Patterson, was born in 1844. Thus, despite some accounts stating that the family were runaway slaves, they were in fact free when they moved north from Raleigh, North Carolina, to settle in Oberlin, Ohio, an abolitionist town, in 1852.

In 1857, Patterson took a one year preparatory course at Oberlin. She did not follow that up with the usual academically less challenging two year course for ladies at Oberlin. She elected instead to follow a degree course including modules on Greek, Latin, and higher mathematics, a course designed for 'gentlemen'. Mary Jane Patterson was the first African-American woman to achieve a BA degree; Lucy Stanton Day Sessions graduated twelve years before Patterson but was not enrolled in a program offering the equivalent degree. Four of the Patterson children graduated from Oberlin College and all four became teachers. Henry Patterson, who as a child was friends with future US president Andrew Johnson, worked as a master mason in Oberlin. For many years the family boarded large numbers of Black students in their home. The Patterson extended family also owned a grocery in Oberlin called Patterson's Corner.

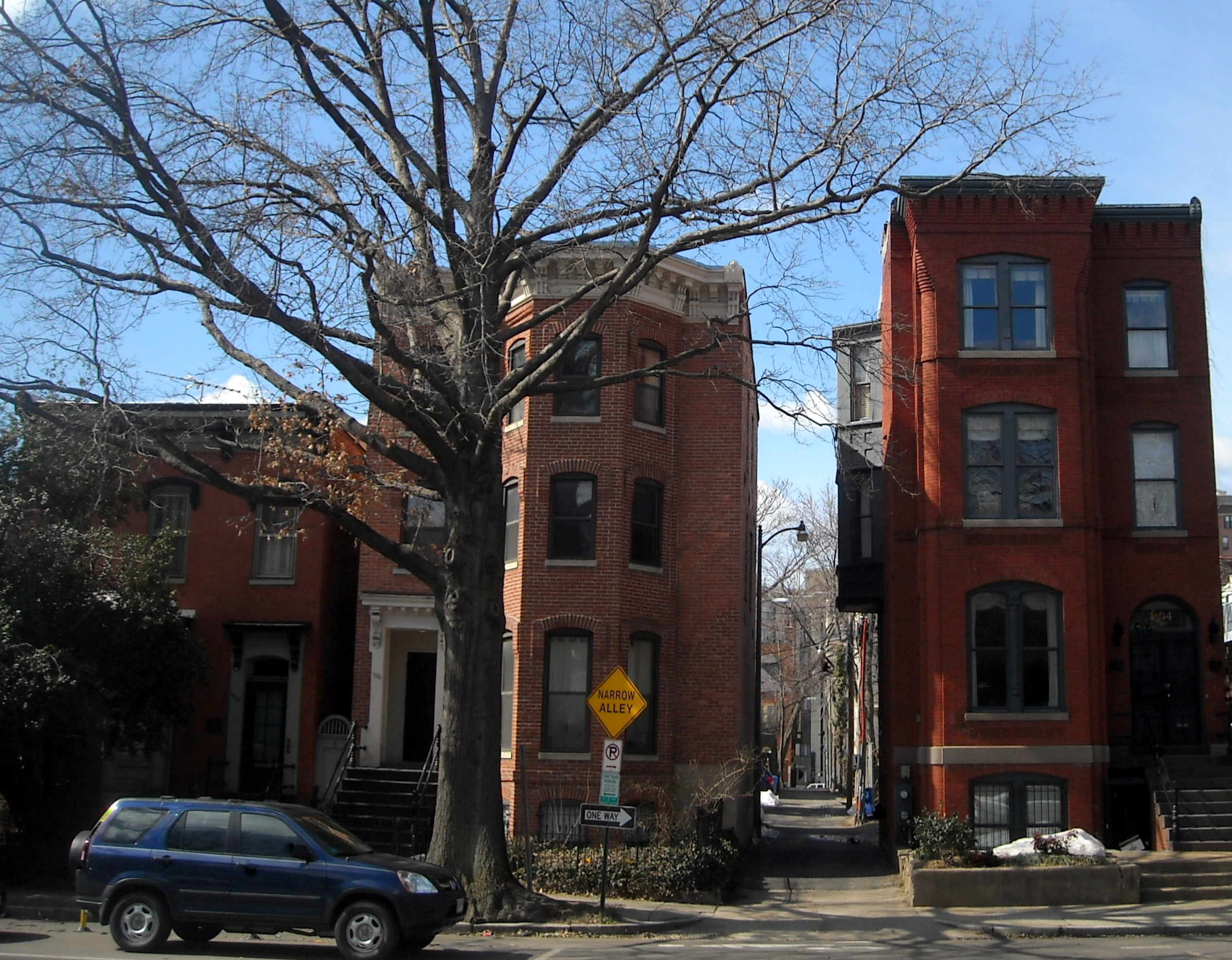
Her home in Washington D.C.

== Teaching career ==
After graduation, Patterson was listed as teaching in Chillicothe, Ohio. On September 21, 1864, she applied for a position in Norfolk, Virginia at a school for Black children. On October 7, 1864, E. H. Fairchild, principal of Oberlin College's preparatory department from 1853 to 1869, wrote recommending her for an "appointment from the American missionary Association as a ... teacher among freedmen." In this letter he described her as "a light quadroon, a graduate of this college, a superior scholar, a good singer, a faithful Christian, and a genteel lady. She had success in teaching and is worthy of the highest ... you pay to ladies."

Although the African American educator Fanny Jackson Coppin had graduated from Oberlin College with a bachelor's degree three years after Patterson, Patterson became an assistant to Coppin in 1865 at the Philadelphia's Institute for Colored Youth (now Cheyney University of Pennsylvania). In 1869 to 1871, Patterson taught in Washington, D.C., at the Preparatory High School for Colored Youth, known today as Dunbar High School. Dunbar was the first public high school for African Americans in the USA. Patterson served as the school's first Black principal, from 1871 to 1872. She was demoted and served as assistant principal under Richard Theodore Greener who was the first Black Harvard University graduate and was the father of Belle da Costa Greene.

When Greener left after one year, Patterson was reappointed as principal and served from 1873 to 1884. During her administration, she was mentor to many Black women educators and the school flourished. It grew from fewer than 50 students to 172, the name "Preparatory High School" was dropped, high school commencements were initiated, and a teacher-training department was added. Patterson's commitment to thoroughness as well as her "forceful" and "vivacious" personality helped her establish the school's strong intellectual standards. In 1884, the administrators of the school decided however that a school of such size would be better headed by a male principal. Patterson was forced to step down for the second time. She continued to teach at the High School until her death. Neither Patterson nor her sisters ever married.

== Other pursuits ==
Patterson was a humanitarian and active in many organizations. She devoted time and money to Black institutions in Washington, D.C. Her obituary in the Evening Star said she "co-operated heartily in sustaining the Home for the Aged and Infirm Colored People in this city and other Kindred organizations." Patterson also worked in 1892 with Mary Church Terrell, Anna Julia Cooper, Josephine Beall Bruce, and others, all supporters of the education and development of Black people at a local and national level, to form the Colored Woman's League of Washington D.C., which was committed to the "racial uplift" of colored women. The league later became the National Association of Colored Women. The league focused on kindergarten teacher training, rescue work, and classes for industrial schools and homemaking.

== Death and legacy ==
Patterson died at her Washington, D.C. home, September 24, 1894. She is recognized as a pioneer in Black education, paving the way for other Black female educators and leaders such as Fanny Jackson Coppin, Mary Church Terrell and Anna Julia Cooper. Her life was spent giving young African Americans the same educational chances that she had been granted at Oberlin College. Her old home is on the route of Washington, D.C.'s historic walking tour.

In Terrell's words, "She was a woman with a strong, forceful personality, and showed tremendous power for good in establishing high intellectual standards in the public schools. Thoroughness was one of Miss Patterson's most striking characteristics as a teacher. She was a quick, alert, vivacious and indefatigable worker." In 2019, a scholarship was established in Patterson's name as part of the California State University, Long Beach, Teachers for Urban Schools project.
