= District of Columbia v. John R. Thompson Co. =

1953 U.S. Supreme Court case on the legality of anti-segregation laws in Washington, D.C.

District of Columbia v. John R. Thompson Co. Inc.
- Supreme Court of the United States

Argued April 30, 1953 Decided June 8, 1953
- Full case name: District of Columbia vs John R. Thompson Co. Inc.
- Citations: 346 U.S. 100 (more) 73 S. Ct. 1007; 97 L. Ed. 2d 1480; 1953 U.S. LEXIS 2001
- Opinion announcement: Opinion announcement

Case history
- Prior: 81 A.2d 249 (D.C. 1951); affirmed in part, reversed in part, 203 F.2d 579 (D.C. Cir. 1953).
- Subsequent: On remand, 214 F.2d 210 (D.C. Cir. 1954).

Holding
- Segregation policies by Thompson Cafeteria's were illegal

Court membership
- Chief Justice Fred M. Vinson Associate Justices Hugo Black · Stanley F. Reed; Felix Frankfurter · William O. Douglas; Robert H. Jackson · Harold H. Burton; Tom C. Clark · Sherman Minton

Case opinion
- Majority: Douglas, joined by Vinson, Black, Reed, Frankfurter, Burton, Clark, Minton
- Jackson took no part in the consideration or decision of the case.

District of Columbia v. John R. Thompson Co. Inc., 346 U.S. 100 (1953), is a United States Supreme Court case which began on April 30, 1953 over the validity of the local Washington Acts of 1872 and 1873. The Acts prohibited segregation in public places within the District. With the court's support, the legal ramifications of the 1872 and 1873 Acts could once again be enforced. The case transpired during growing racial tension in the nation's capital. Throughout Washington, the black community had grown tired of unfair treatment regarding housing, businesses, and education. But, change came soon enough through the courts. On June 8, 1953, the Supreme Court unanimously ruled that the segregating policies practiced by Thompson's Cafeteria were illegal, marking a huge victory for the national black community.

== Context ==
This challenge to segregation initially came from an African American activist, Mary Church Terrell. At 87, she was the chair of Washington's Coordinating Committee, which fought for desegregation across the city. Thanks to research by Howard University Law School Librarian Mercer Daniel, lawyers from the D.C. Lawyers Guild such as Charles Hamilton Houston, Joseph Forer, and David Rein were able to notify Terrell that a number of laws from the Reconstruction Era that outlawed segregation, while not enforced, had technically never been repealed. Consequently, on January 27, 1950, Terrell and a small group of friends walked through the doors of Thompson's diner and requested a table. After the manager promptly refused to serve them, the Coordinating Committee thrust the issue of segregated eating establishments onto the legal and social stage of the nation's capital.

Given its long list of civil rights all-stars including Walter E. Washington, William Hastie, Robert C. Weaver, and Annie Stein, the Coordinating Committee obtained media attention and put pressure on local officials. Normally when it was presented with segregated eating establishments, its actions included boycotts, protests, and silent negotiations. The group also amassed and distributed a wildly-popular list of preferred restaurants that served both blacks and whites as a means of putting economic pressure on more- reluctant restaurant owners. In this instance, the Committee decided to use Thompson's diner on 14th Street as the example to challenge in court. After the restaurant manager rejected Terrell and her friends, the Committee pressed the District Commissioners to look more closely at the restaurant for failing to comply with the Acts of 1872 and 1873.

== Lower courts ==
Noticing that the Acts had clearly never been repealed, the City Commissioners immediately sided with Terrell. However, Thompson's manager was still unwilling to budge on his stance. Consequently, the District sued it on Terrell and the committee's behalf, and the case was brought to the local Municipal Court in July 1950. The Board of Trade, a notoriously-white elitist group that actively lobbied for Congress to uphold segregation, came to the legal aid of the restaurant. The Municipal Court quickly rejected the District's claim that the Reconstruction laws were still in effect stating that the laws "had been repealed by implication on the enactment by Congress of the Organic Act of June 11, 1878." That Act restructured the local government to contain only three presidentially-appointed commissioners. Therefore, the Court argued that since the former laws had been put in place by an obsolete government, they no longer applied. A lengthy appeals process followed.

In May 1951, Washington's Municipal Court of Appeals overturned the original ruling. In discussing the 1872 and 1873 laws, the Appeals Court stated that "the former Act insofar as it applied to restaurants, had been repealed, but the latter act was still in effect." Therefore, the 1873 Act was still valid because there were no laws that automatically repealed measures put in place by former officials. However, the victory was short-lived because the verdict did not go into effect until all appeals had been heard. In January 1953, the federal U.S. Court of Appeals overruled the lower-level verdict by one vote: 5–4. Given the contradicting verdicts from various judges, the case soon found itself on the docket of the US Supreme Court. On April 30, 1953, the Supreme Court began its review of the case.

== Supreme Court decision ==
The Supreme Court found flaws in the arguments put forth on Thompson's behalf. For one, the Court stated that "the failure of the executive branch to enforce a law does not result in its modification or repeal." Essentially, although the city did not enforce the 1873 Act for roughly eight decades, it was still in effect. In addition, the Supreme Court reinforced that only Congress had "the power to pass laws which would alter or repeal the Acts of the Legislative Assembly." The Court referenced how Congress, in the Organic Act of 1878, took away all legislative power from the local municipal government in Washington. Therefore, only Congress thereafter had the ability to repeal the 1873 Act, which protected the rights of all races in public places. Since Congress did not act on its power to appeal the Act, it was technically still in effect. Finally, the Supreme Court also touched on the controversy over the Code of 1901, which gave the local, Washington government more autonomy. The Court stated that "even if we assume that after the Code of 1901 the Commissioners had the authority to replace these anti-discrimination laws with others ones, we find no indication that they ever did so."

Consequently, on June 8, 1953, the Supreme Court overturned the decision of the Appeals Court and ruled in favor of the District of Columbia.

== Aftermath ==
Terrell stated, "I will die happy to know that the children of my group will not grow up thinking they are inferior because they are deprived of rights which children of other racial groups enjoy." At the age of 90, she was ecstatic to have not only the privilege but also the right at last to be served anywhere in the nation's capital. Along with Hurd v. Hodge and Bolling v. Sharpe, the case helped end institutionalized segregation in Washington.

== Bibliography ==
- Caplan, Marvin. 1989. “Eat Anywhere!”. Washington History 1 (1). Historical Society of Washington, D.C.: 24–39. JSTOR 40072980. Pg26
- Supreme Court of the United States June 8, 1953346 U.S. 10073 S.Ct. 100797 L.Ed. 1480
- D.C. v. John R. Thompson Co., 346 U.S. 100, 73 S. Ct. 1007, 97 L. Ed. 1480 (1953)
- Alice Dunnigan, “Resents Ike’s Taking Credit For Winning DC Restaurant Case,” New York Amsterdam News, 20 January 1953.
