= Mary Church Terrell =

American educator and activist (1863–1954)

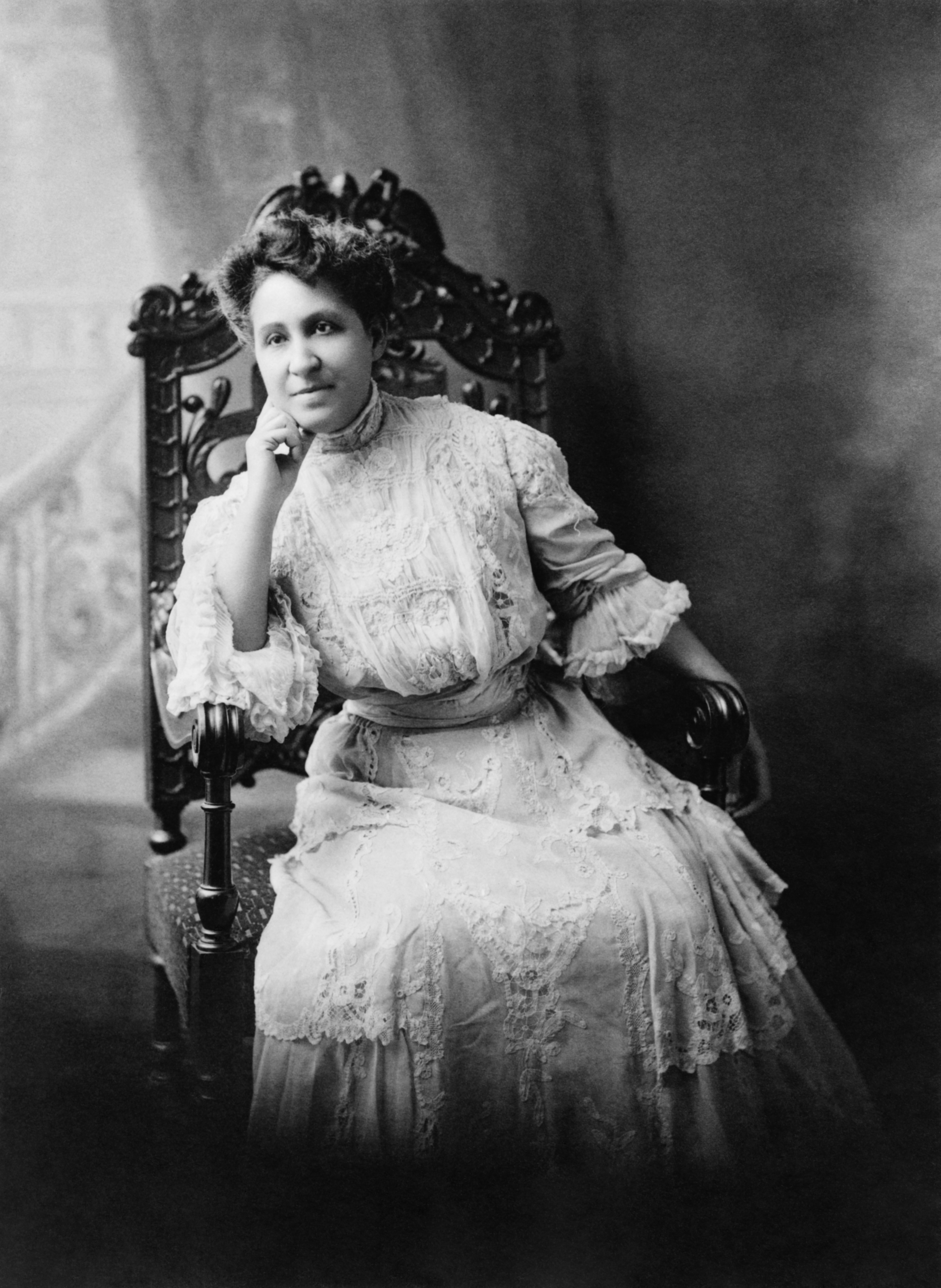
- Born: Mary Church; September 23, 1863; Memphis, Tennessee
- Died: July 24, 1954 (aged 90); Annapolis, Maryland
- Other name: Euphemia Kirk
- Education: Oberlin College (BA, MA)
- Occupations: Civil rights activist, journalist
- Known for: One of the first African-American women to earn a college degree Founding member of National Association of Colored Women; Charter member of the National Association for the Advancement of Colored People
- Political party: Republican
- Spouse: Robert Heberton Terrell (m. 1891; died 1925)
- Children: 5 (one adopted, three died in infancy) including Phyllis
- Parent(s): Robert Reed Church; Louisa Ayres

Mary "Mollie" Eliza Church Terrell (born Mary Church; September 23, 1863 – July 24, 1954) was an American civil rights activist, journalist, teacher, and suffragist. She was one of the first African American women to earn a college degree.

Terrell taught in Washington, D.C., in the Latin Department at the M Street School, now known as Paul Laurence Dunbar High School, the nation's first African American public high school in the nation. From 1895 to 1906, she served on the District of Columbia school board; she was the first African-American woman to be appointed to the school board of a major city. Terrell was a charter member of the National Association for the Advancement of Colored People (1909) and the Colored Women's League of Washington (1892). She helped found the National Association of Colored Women (1896) and served as its first national president, and she was a founding member of the National Association of College Women (1923).

== Early life and education ==
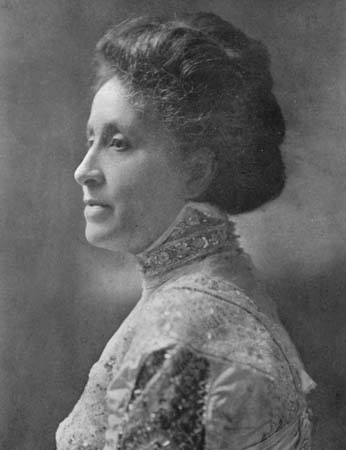
Mary Church Terrell

Mary Church was born September 23, 1863, in Memphis, Tennessee, to Robert Reed Church and Louisa Ayres, both freed slaves of mixed racial ancestry They were the offspring of enslaved women and white slave owners: Robert's father and maternal grandfather and Louisa's father. Her parents were freed at the end of the Civil War.

After the Civil War, Louisa opened a store selling wigs and hair extensions, which gave the family financial security. Robert opened a saloon; when he was denied a license due to his race, he successfully sued the State of Tennessee for violating the Civil Rights Act of 1866. After the Memphis massacre of 1866 and yellow fever epidemic of 1878, he bought property around Beale Street becoming one of the first black millionaires in the American South and an influential member of the Republican party. In the midst of national adversity, the Terrell family became a part of a rising upper class in the United States.

Robert and Louisa divorced in 1874, and Louisa moved from Memphis to New York City. Mary Church and her little brother lived with their mother after the divorce. The court's ruling was likely influenced by Robert's public violence, the fact that he operated a tavern, and Louisa's evidence about his temper at home. Mary Church's father was married three times. His first marriage was to Margaret Pico Church from 1857 to 1862, with whom he had a daughter named Laura. Robert then married Louisa Ayers in 1862. Mary and her brother Thomas Ayres Church (1867–1937) were both products of this marriage. Their half-siblings, Robert, Jr. (1885–1952) and Annette (1887–1975), were born to Robert Sr.'s third wife, Anna Wright.

In 1871, when Mary Church was 8 years old, her parents sent her to Antioch College's Model School in Yellow Springs, Ohio, and hired a tutor to teach her German. In 1875, her parents moved her to Oberlin, Ohio, where she attended Oberlin public school from eighth grade through high school. She graduated in 1879, when she was 15. Church then attended Oberlin College. Earning her degree made her among the earliest African American women to earn a college degree. Terrell's class position and ability to earn a degree gave her the ability to fight against racial discrimination, giving a voice to the voiceless. She enrolled in the four-year "gentleman's course" instead of the expected two-year ladies' course, despite being warned that the course was difficult and that being overeducated would make it hard to find a husband. In the gentleman's course, she learned Latin and Greek. At Oberlin, Church was elected freshman-class poet, edited the college newspaper, and participated in the Aeolian women's club. While most of her classmates were white and she experienced occasional racial discrimination, she considered herself popular and felt her high social class carried more weight than her race. She earned a Bachelor of Arts degree in 1884, graduating alongside Anna J. Cooper and Ida Gibbs Hunt; the three activists would become lifelong colleagues. In 1888, she earned a Master of Arts. She also studied abroad in Europe for two years.

== Career ==
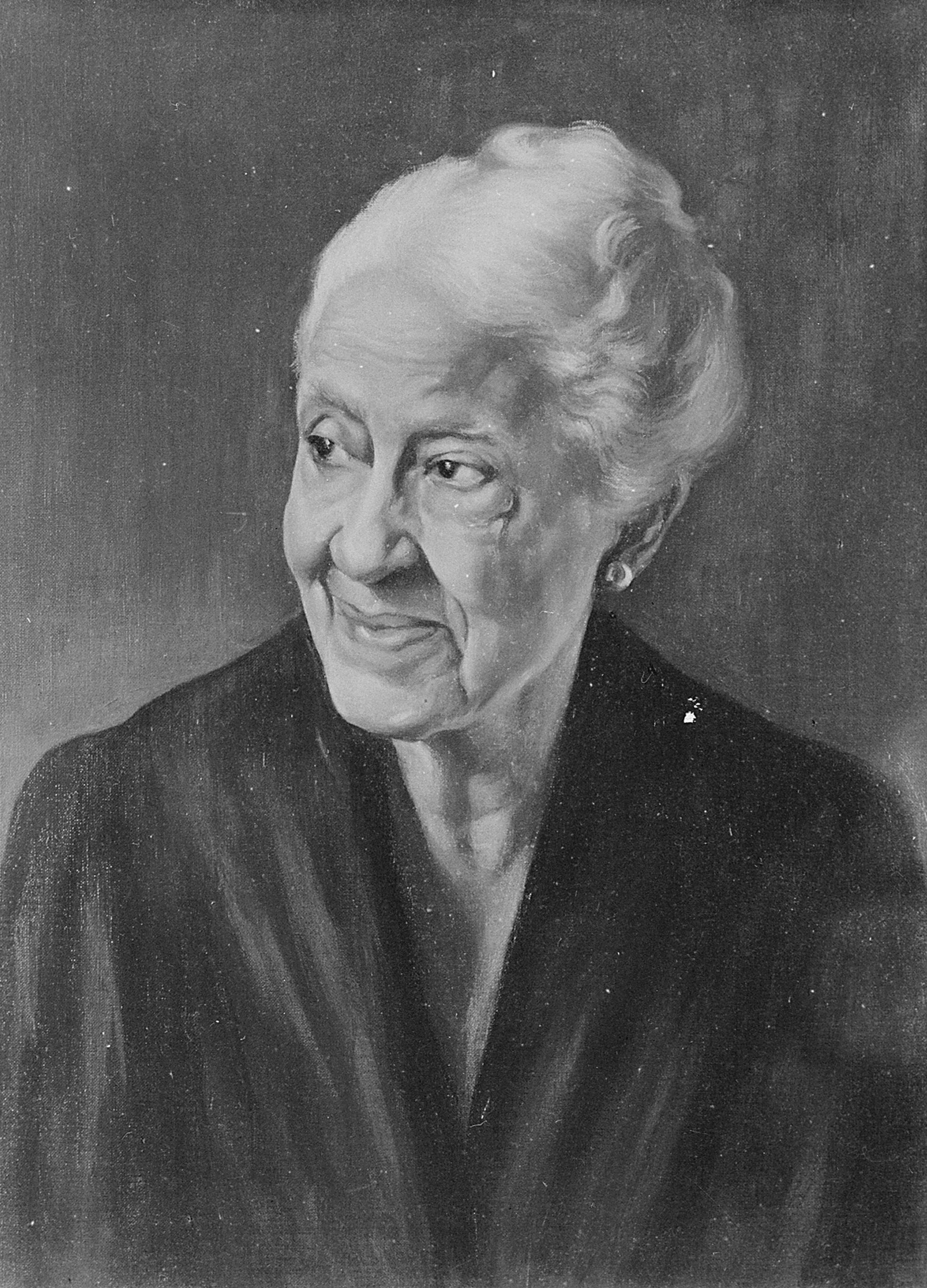
Painting of Mary Church Terrell by Betsy Graves Reyneau, 1888–1964

Mary Church began her career in education in 1885, teaching modern languages at Wilberforce University. After two years of teaching in Ohio, she moved to Washington, D.C., to teach Latin at M Street High School. She took a leave of absence from teaching in 1888 to travel and study in Europe for two years, where in Italy, France, Germany, Italy and Switzerland she became fluent in French, German, and Italian. In 1881, Oberlin College offered her a registrarship position, which would have made her the first African-American women with such position, but she declined. When she married Robert "Berto" Heberton Terrell in 1891, she was forced to resign from her position at the M Street School where her husband also taught. In 1895, she was appointed superintendent by the Washington, D.C. school board—the first woman to hold the post.

Upon returning to the United States, Church shifted her attention from teaching to social activism, focusing especially on the empowerment of African-American women and ironically having to fight Susan B. Anthony and Elizabeth Cady Stanton on their views of non-white women's suffrage. She also wrote prolifically, including an autobiography, and her writing was published in several journals. "Lynching from a Negro's Point of View," published in 1904, is included in Terrell's long list of published work where she attempts to dismantle the skewed narrative of why Black men are targeted for lynching and she presents numerous facts to support her claims.

Terrell's autobiography, A Colored Woman in a White World (1940), recounts her personal experiences with racism. Terrell began writing in 1925, which she self-published 15 years later at the age of 78.

== Activism ==
=== Black women's clubs and the National Association of Colored Women ===
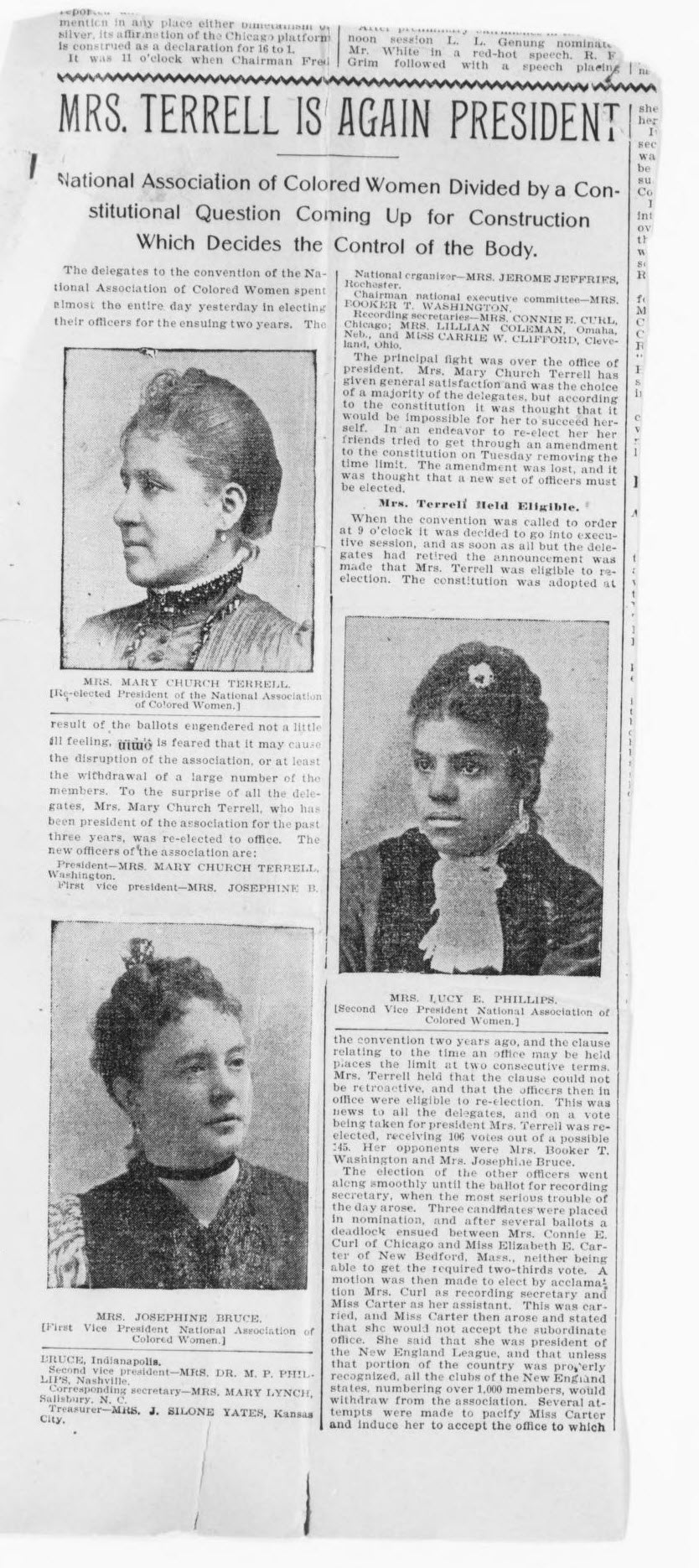
Newspaper article on Terrell's re-election as president

In 1892, Terrell, along with Helen Appo Cook, Ida B. Wells-Barnett, Anna J. Cooper, Charlotte Forten Grimké, Mary Jane Patterson and Evelyn Shaw, formed the Colored Women's League in Washington, D.C. The goals of the service-oriented club were to promote unity, social progress, and the best interests of the African American community. Cook was elected president. The Colored Women's League aided in elevating the lives of educated African-American women. It also started a training program and kindergarten, before these were included in the Washington, DC public schools. Combined with her achievements as a principal, the success of the League's educational initiatives led to Terrell's appointment to the District of Columbia Board of Education which she held from 1895 to 1906. She was the first African-American woman to hold such a position.

Around the same time, another group of progressive African-American women were gathering in Boston, Massachusetts under the direction of suffragist and intellectual Josephine St. Pierre Ruffin under the name Federation of Afro-American Women. As both organizations had similar ambitions and audiences, they combined their efforts with hundreds of other organizations to reach a wider focus of African-American women workers, students and activists nearing the beginning of the 20th century. Out of this union formed the National Association of Colored Women, which became the first secular national organization dedicated to the livelihoods of African-American women. Black women from the middle class and upper class felt it was their duty to demonstrate what black women could be, do, and accomplish in the early 1890s. With Mary Church Terrell serving as its first president, they established the National Association of Colored Women in 1896 in the hopes of gaining a national voice to advance the welfare of all African Americans. The NACW's motto was "Lifting as we climb" and they aimed to create solidarity among Black women while combating racial discrimination. Among other initiatives, members created day nurseries and kindergartens for Black children. Terrell was twice elected president, serving from 1896 to 1901. After declining a third re-election, she was named honorary president of the Association.

In 1910, Terrell founded the College Alumnae Club, which later became the National Association of University Women (NAUW). The League started a training program and kindergarten before being included in the Washington, DC public school system.

=== Fighting for Black women's suffrage ===
Having been an avid suffragist during her years as an Oberlin student, Terrell continued to be active in the happenings within suffragist circles in the National American Woman Suffrage Association. Through these meetings she became associated with Susan B. Anthony, an association which Terrell describes in her biography as "delightful, helpful friendship," which lasted until Anthony's death in 1906. Terrell also came to know Elizabeth Cady Stanton in 1893 around the same time she met Susan B. Anthony. What grew out of Terrell's association with NAWSA was a desire to create a formal organizing group among African-American women to tackle issues of lynching, the disenfranchisement of the race, and the development of educational reform. As one of the few African-American women who was allowed to attend NAWSA's meetings, Terrell spoke directly about the injustices and issues within the African-American community.

On February 18, 1898, Terrell gave an address titled "The Progress of Colored Women" at the National American Woman Suffrage Association biennial session in Washington, D.C. This speech was a call of action for NAWSA to fight for the lives of Black women. It was also during this session that Terrell addressed the "double burden" African American women were facing. Terrell believed that, when compared to Euro-American women, African American women had to overcome not only their sex, but race as well. The speech received great reception from the Association and African-American news outlets, ultimately leading Terrell to be invited back as an unofficial African-American ambassador for the Association. Though many African-American women were concerned and involved in the fight for American women's right to vote, the NAWSA did not allow African-American women to create their own chapter within the organization. Terrell went on to give more addresses, such as "In Union There is Strength", which discussed the need for unity among African-American people, and "What it Means to be Colored in the Capital of the U.S.", in which she discussed her own personal struggles that she faced as an African American woman in Washington, D.C. Terrell also addressed the Seneca Falls Historical Society in 1908 and praised the work of woman suffragists who were fighting for all races and genders alongside their primary causes. Terrell's life work was centered on the concept of racial uplift, which held that Black Americans could help end racial prejudice by progressing themselves and other members of the race through education, work, and community action.

In her autobiography, A Colored Woman In A White World, Terrell recalls that, although she never passed as White at Oberlin, which was founded by abolitionists and accepted both Euro-American and African-American students even before the Civil War, her racial ambiguity helped her to navigate life at the predominantly White-attended Oberlin with a sense of ease. Her gender distinguished her more than her race at Oberlin, as most of her classmates in the classical program were men. In subsequent years, she understood her mobility as a Euro-American-passing African-American woman as necessary to creating greater links between African-Americans and Euro-American Americans, thus leading her to become an active voice in NAWSA. "Lifting as we climb” became the motto of the NACW, tying to her ideology of racial uplift to end racial discrimination.

In 1913, Alice Paul organized a NAWSA suffrage rally where she initially planned to exclude Black suffragists and later relegated them to the back of the parade in order to curry favor with Southern Euro-American women. However, Terrell and Ida B. Wells fought to integrate the march. Terrell marched with the delegation from New York City, while the Delta Sigma Theta sorority women of Howard University, whom Terrell mentored, marched with the other college women.

Active in the Republican Party, she was appointed director of Work among African-American Women of the East by the Republican National Committee for Warren G. Harding's 1920 presidential campaign during the first election in which American women won the right to vote. The Southern states from 1890 to 1908 passed voter registration and election laws that disenfranchised African-Americans of their right to vote. These restrictions were not fully overturned until after Congressional passage of the Voting Rights Act of 1965.

=== Integration ===
Historians have generally emphasized Terrell's role as a community leader and civil rights and women's rights activist during the Progressive Era. She learned about women's rights while at Oberlin, where she became familiar with Susan B. Anthony's activism.

She also had a prolific career as a journalist (she identified as a writer). In the 1880s and 1890s she sometimes used the pen name Euphemia Kirk to publish in both the Black and White press promoting the African American Women's Club Movement. She wrote for a variety of newspapers "published either by or in the interest of colored people," such as the A.M.E. Church Review of Philadelphia, Pennsylvania; the Southern Workman of Hampton, Virginia; the Indianapolis Freeman; the Afro-American of Baltimore; the Washington Tribune; the Chicago Defender; the New York Age; the Voice of the Negro; the Women's World; the North American Review and the Norfolk Journal and Guide. She also contributed to the Washington Evening Star and the Washington Post.

Terrell aligned the African-American Women's Club Movement with the broader struggle of black women and black people for equality. In 1892, she was elected as the first woman president of the prominent Washington DC black debate organization Bethel Literary and Historical Society

Through family connections and social networking, Terrell met many influential African-American activists of her day, including Booker T. Washington, director of the influential Tuskegee Institute in Alabama. At the age of 17, when she was enrolled at Oberlin, her father introduced her to activist Frederick Douglass at President James Garfield's inaugural gala. She became especially close with Douglass and worked with him on several civil rights campaigns. One of these campaigns includes a petition both Terrell and Douglass signed, in 1893, in hopes of a hearing of statement regarding lawless cases where black individuals in certain states were not receiving due process of law. Shortly after her marriage to Robert Terrell, she considered retiring from activism to focus on family life. Douglass, making the case that her talent was too immense to go unused, persuaded her to stay in public life.

In 1904, Terrell was invited to speak at the International Congress of Women, held in Berlin, Germany. She was the only black woman at the conference. She received an enthusiastic ovation when she honored the host nation by delivering her address in German. She delivered the speech in French, and concluded with the English version.

In 1909, Terrell was one of two African-American women (journalist Ida B. Wells-Barnett was the other) invited to sign the "Call" and to attend the first organizational meeting of the National Association for the Advancement of Colored People (NAACP), becoming a founding member. In 1913–14, she helped organize the Delta Sigma Theta sorority. She helped write its oath and became an honorary member.

In World War I, Terrell was involved with the War Camp Community Service, which supported recreation for servicemen. Later it aided in issues related to the demobilization of black servicemen. Terrell was a delegate to the International Peace Conference after the end of the war. While in England, she stayed with H. G. Wells and his wife at their invitation.

Terrell worked actively in the women's suffrage movement, which pushed for enactment of the Nineteenth Amendment to the United States Constitution. Though Terrell died in 1954, her legacy and early fight for black women to vote continues to be cited. As the war was winding down, Terrell and her daughter Phyllis joined Alice Paul and Lucy Burns, of the National Women's Party, to picket the White House for women's suffrage.

Terrell was instrumental in integrating the American Association of University Women. From 1905 to 1910, she had actually been a member of that organization's Washington, D.C. chapter as an Oberlin graduate. However, she let her membership lapse due to growing involvement in other civic commitments. By the time she sought reinstatement in 1946, the chapter had become all-White and refused her application. Terrell appealed the matter to the national office which affirmed her eligibility, but the D.C. chapter changed its rules to make membership contingent on approval from its board of directors. After the chapter refused to amend its bylaws, the AAUW's national office filed a lawsuit in federal district court on Terrell's behalf, but lost the case. This led to the overwhelming passage at the organization's 1949 convention of an anti-discrimination requirement. Incidentally, a number of the Washington, D.C. chapter's White members subsequently resigned in protest and formed their own organization, the University Women's Club of Washington. In 1948 Terrell won the anti-discrimination lawsuit (against the AAUW) and regained her membership, becoming the first black member after the exclusion of people of color within the DC chapter.

In 1950, Terrell started what would be a successful fight to integrate eating places in the District of Columbia. In the 1890s the District of Columbia had formalized segregation, as did states in the South. Before then, local integration laws dating to the 1870s had required all eating-place proprietors "to serve any respectable, well-behaved person regardless of color, or face a $1,000 fine and forfeiture of their license." In 1949, Terrell and colleagues Clark F. King, Essie Thompson, and Arthur F. Elmer entered the segregated Thompson Restaurant. When refused service, they promptly filed a lawsuit. Attorney Ringgold Hart, representing Thompson, argued on April 1, 1950, that the District laws were unconstitutional, and later won the case against restaurant segregation. In the three years pending a decision in District of Columbia v. John R. Thompson Co., Terrell targeted other restaurants. Her tactics included boycotts, picketing, and sit-ins. Finally, on June 8, 1953, the court ruled that segregated eating places in Washington, DC, were unconstitutional. Terrell was a leader and spokesperson for the Coordinating Committee for the Enforcement of the District of Columbia Anti-Discrimination Laws which gave her the platform to lead this case successfully.

After the age of 80, Terrell continued to participate in picket lines, protesting the segregation of restaurants and theaters. During her senior years, she also succeeded in persuading the local chapter of the American Association of University Women to admit black members.

Mary's ninetieth birthday luncheon was hosted by the Black community in Washington, D.C. There were more than 700 attendees, including staff members of President Eisenhower. During that party, the guests announced the establishment of The Mary Church Terrell Fund, a nonprofit that generated funds to eradicate racism in Washington, D.C., was declared by attendees during the celebration. Through her activism, Mary Church Terrell demonstrated a lifetime dedication to racial and gender equality. She devoted her life to promoting women's suffrage, civic involvement, and education for African Americans, drawing on her education, privilege, and global experience. Terrell was positioned at the nexus of early civil rights and feminist movements thanks to her involvement in groups like the National Association of Colored Women, the NAACP, and the National American Woman Suffrage Association.

She lived to see the Supreme Court's decision in Brown v. Board of Education, holding unconstitutional the racial segregation of public schools. Terrell died two months later at the age of 90, on July 24, 1954, in Anne Arundel General Hospital in Highland Beach, Maryland. It was the week before the NACW was to hold its annual meeting in Annapolis, Maryland near her home in Highland Beech.

== Legacy and honors ==
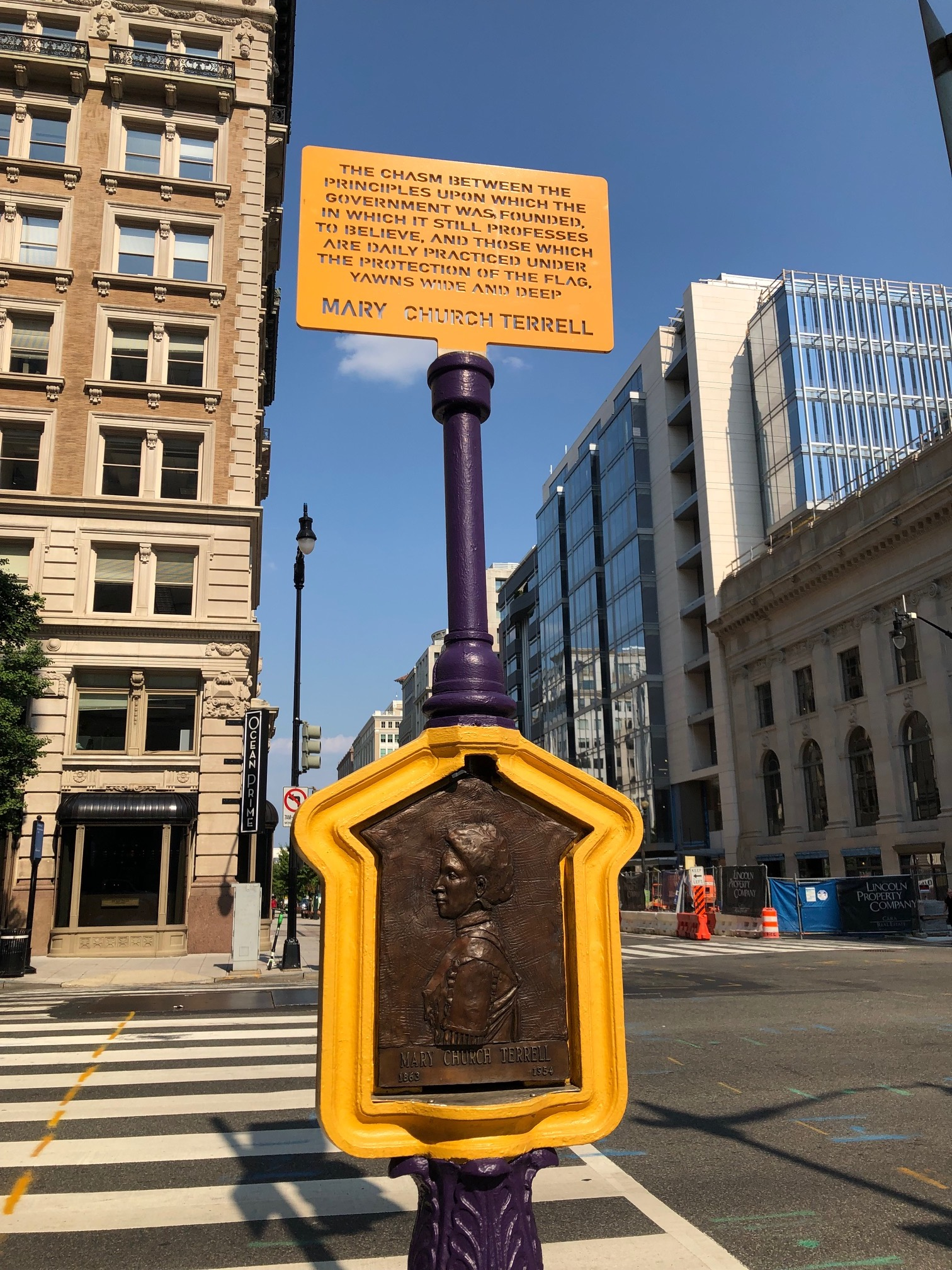
A marker honoring Mary Church Terrell in Washington, D.C.

- 1933 – At Oberlin College's centennial celebration, Terrell was recognized among the college's "Top 100 Outstanding Alumni".
- 1948 – Oberlin awarded Terrell the honorary Doctorate of Humane Letters.
- 1954 – First Lady Mamie Eisenhower paid tribute to Terrell's memory in a letter read to the NACW convention on August 1, writing: "For more than 60 years, her great gifts were dedicated to the betterment of humanity, and she left a truly inspiring record."
- 1975 – The Mary Church Terrell house in the LeDroit Park neighborhood of Washington was named a National Historic Landmark.
- Mary Church Terrell Elementary School at 3301 Wheeler Road, SE in Washington, DC was named in her honor, closed in 2013.
- 2002 – Scholar Molefi Kete Asante included Mary Church Terrell on his list of 100 Greatest African Americans.
- 2009 – Terrell was among 12 pioneers of civil rights commemorated in a United States Postal Service postage stamp series.
- A school in Gert Town, New Orleans was named Mary Church Terrell Elementary School. It was severely damaged in Hurricane Katrina, closed in 2008, and demolished in 2012.
- 2018 – Oberlin College named its main library the Mary Church Terrell Main Library.
- 2020 – Terrell was inducted into the National Women's Hall of Fame.

=== Suffs ===
Terrell was a secondary figure in the 2024 musical Suffs along with her daughter, Phyllis Terrell as important viewpoints to the gaps in the white led suffrigist movements as well as their active involvement in both female and black rights movements. Along with Ida B. Wells, the two represent competing viewpoints in how the two movements intersected, with Terrell playing the active diplomat and Wells the challenger. She is played by Anastacia McCleskey in the PBS Great Performance stage recording of the broadway musical.

== Marriage and children ==
On October 18, 1891, in Memphis, Church married Robert Heberton Terrell, a lawyer who became the first black municipal court judge in Washington, DC. The couple first met in Washington, DC, when Robert visited the home of Dr. John Francis, where Mary was living. Soon after meeting, Francis offered Mary the opportunity to teach at the M Street High School, in the Greek and Latin Department, which Robert was the head of.

Prior to being engaged in a committed relationship, both Mary and Robert showed interest in pursuing others as romantic partners. Documentation from Mary's diary and letters that she wrote in both French and German in order to practice her language proficiency contain proof of correspondence with other men besides Robert. In Robert's courting letters to Mary, he mentions other women as well, though it is undetermined whether he mentioned them to make Mary jealous or for other reasons.

However, once Mary Church returned from her travel in Europe, she returned to her work at the M Street High School where she rekindled her romance with Robert. While she had been away, Robert became a lawyer; it is speculated that he regretted leaving his teacher job but sought an income that would enable him to propose to Mary and support their life together.

As a couple, Mary and Robert ran in many academic circles; Robert was a leader in the Washington D.C. NAACP Chapter, and a member of the Music, Social, and Literary Club.

The early years of their marriage were marked by personal tragedy: Terrell experienced a late-term miscarriage and a stillbirth; another baby died just after birth. In 1898, their daughter Phyllis Terrell was born; named for Phillis Wheatley, she would survive to old age. Terrell later adopted another daughter, Mary.

Mary Church's miscarriage had lasting effects on her marriage to Robert; she suffered long-term health complications that sent her into a deep depression. Prior to her miscarriage, she had learned of her friend Thomas' lynching, and not long after learning of his death and losing her child, she began to suffer physically and mentally. Eventually, Terrell began to focus on anti-lynching activism and spoke publicly about black women's health, using her past trauma and experiences to inform her message. Through her family life and public activism, Terrell modeled the ideals of professional and domestic achievement that she emphasized for African American women nationwide.

During the early years of the Wilson administration, segregation in the US capital and nationwide disrupted the Terrell family's personal and professional lives. Raising children as members of the Talented Tenth was a major challenge in the era of Jim Crow. Mary Church Terrell accompanied her children, Mary and Phyllis, to Oberlin for the fall semester of 1913, where they faced adversity and segregation. Terrell was worried about being away from her daughters during this time and travelled with them because of this. She had hoped Mary and Phyllis would be treated equally. Instead, she discovered Jim Crow had overrun a school created by abolitionists, which had welcomed black and female students before the Civil War, acted as an Underground Railroad stop, and battled the Fugitive Slave Act. This was deeply disheartening for Mary Church because she had always wanted to send her children to Oberlin and she began standing up for the rights of Black students at schools such as Oberlin.

== Works ==
- "Duty of the National Association of Colored Women to the Race", A. M. E. Church Review (January 1900), 340–354.
- "Club Work of Colored Women", Southern Workman, August 8, 1901, 435–438.
- "Society Among the Colored People of Washington", Voice of the Negro (April 1904), 150–156.
- Terrell, Mary Church (1904). "Lynching from a Negro's Point of View". The North American Review. 178 (571): 853–868. JSTOR 25150991.
- "The Washington Conservatory of Music for Colored People", Voice of the Negro (November 1904), 525–530.
- "Purity and the Negro", Light (June 1905), 19–25.
- "Paul Laurence Dunbar", Voice of the Negro (April 1906), 271–277.
- "Susan B. Anthony, the Abolitionist", Voice of the Negro (June 1906), 411–416.
- "A Plea for the White South by a Colored Woman", Nineteenth Century (July 1906), 70–84.
- "What It Means to Be Colored in the Capital of the United States", Independent, October 10, 1906, 181–186.
- "An Interview with W. T. Stead on the Race Problem", Voice of the Negro (July 1907), 327–330
- "Peonage in the United States: The Convict Lease System and the Chain Gangs", Nineteenth Century 62 (August 1907), 306–322.
- "Phyllis Wheatley – An African Genius". Star of the West. 19 (7): 221–223. October 1928. (see Phyllis Wheatley.)
- A Colored Woman in a White World (1940), autobiography.
- "I Remember Frederick Douglass", Ebony (1953), 73–80.

== See also ==
- Black suffrage in the United States
