= Robert Heberton Terrell =

American judge (1857–1925)

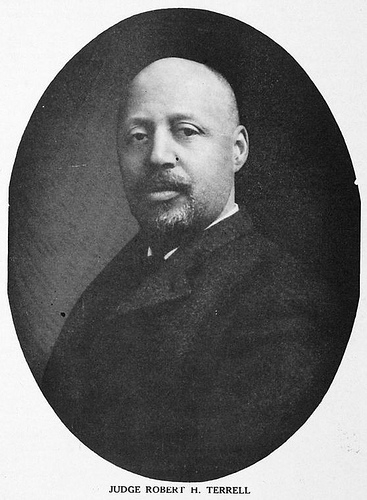
- Born: November 27, 1857; Orange, Virginia, US
- Died: December 20, 1925 (aged 68); Washington, D.C., US
- Education: Harvard University; Howard University School of Law
- Spouse: Mary Church (m. 1891)
- Children: 5 (including one adopted and three died in infancy)

Robert Heberton Terrell (November 27, 1857 – December 20, 1925) was an attorney and the second African American to serve as a justice of the peace in Washington, D.C. In 1911 he was appointed as a judge to the District of Columbia Municipal Court by President William Howard Taft; he was one of four African-American men appointed to high office and considered his "Black Cabinet". He was reappointed as judge under succeeding administrations, including that of Democrat Woodrow Wilson.

== Early life ==
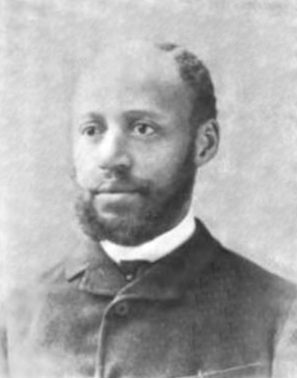
As a Harvard undergraduate

Terrell was born in Orange, Virginia, on November 27, 1857, to parents Harrison and Louisa Ann Terrell. The family moved to Washington, DC in 1865 after the end of the Civil War and emancipation. His father Harrison Terrell worked for prominent businessman George Washington Riggs. Later he served as the personal valet for General Ulysses S. Grant. These connections aided the younger Terrell in his education and later career.

Terrell was educated in the public schools of the District of Columbia. He prepared for college at Lawrence Academy in Groton, Massachusetts. He then gained admission to Harvard College, where he graduated as one of seven magna cum laude scholars in 1884. He was Harvard's first black honors graduate and third black graduate overall.

While teaching for several years at the M Street School in Washington, DC, Terrell studied law at Howard University School of Law, receiving his LL.B. degree in 1889.

== Marriage and family ==
On October 18, 1891, Terrell married Mary Eliza Church. They had one daughter, Phyllis Terrell and three other children who died in infancy. They also adopted another daughter, Mary. The two met at the Preparatory School for Colored Youth, now known as the M Street High School, in Washington, D.C., where they both were teachers. This was a premier academic high school in a segregated system.

== Early career ==
After graduation from Harvard, from 1884 to 1889, Terrell taught at the M Street High School. He was a participant in the March 5, 1897 meeting to celebrate the memory of leader Frederick Douglass. The group founded the American Negro Academy, led by Alexander Crummell. From the founding of the organization until his death in 1925, Terrell remained active among the scholars, editors, and activists of this first major African-American learned society. He worked with them to refute racist scholarship, promote black claims to individual, social, and political equality, and publish books and articles on the history and sociology of African-American life.

In 1889, Terrell left the M Street School when he was appointed the chief of division, Office of the Fourth Auditor of the U.S. Treasury Department. In 1896, Terrell began a partnership with John R. Lynch to create the law firm of Lynch and Terrell in Washington D.C. Their firm existed for about two years. They closed it in 1898, when President William McKinley appointed Lynch as "a Major and Paymaster of volunteers to serve as such in the Spanish–American War."

In 1899, Terrell returned to the M Street High School as principal. He left in 1901 for another federal political appointment.

== Municipal Court of the District of Columbia ==
In 1901, Terrell, a Republican, accepted an appointment to serve as a justice of the peace in Washington D.C.. He was the second African American appointed to this post, following Emanuel D. Molyneaux Hewlett, who served from 1890 to 1906. This marked a difficult time for Terrell and other African-American leaders. Although Republican administrations appointed Terrell and other African Americans to certain high-ranking political positions, they did not work to achieve greater civil rights to all African Americans, especially those millions oppressed in the South by disenfranchisement and Jim Crow laws.

In 1911, Terrell was appointed by newly elected President William Howard Taft to the Municipal Court of the District of Columbia. Terrell was one of four African Americans appointed to high office under Taft, and they were known as his "Black Cabinet". He was reappointed by Taft, Republican President Theodore Roosevelt, and even Democrat Woodrow Wilson.

== Howard University Law ==
In 1911 Terrell also received an appointment as a faculty member at Howard University's School of Law, while still serving as a municipal judge. In February 1911 he became a charter member of the first Washington D.C. chapter of Sigma Pi Phi fraternity, an organization of professional men who were college educated. He continued to teach at Howard until his death in 1925.

In 1919, Terrell, along with Henry Lassiter, Lafayette M. Hershaw, Archibald Grimké, and Walter J. Singleton, was a prime mover in the introduction by Congressman Martin B. Madden of a law (H.R. No. 376) to abolish the "Jim Crow" car in public transportation. The Madden Amendment to the Esch–Cummins Act failed.

== Last years and death ==
About four years before his death, Terrell suffered his first stroke. About a year later he had a second stroke, resulting in paralysis on one side of his body. Despite also suffering severe asthma and having declining health, Terrell continued to serve as a municipal court judge. In early December 1925, Terrell's asthma and health began to worsen. He died at his home in Washington on December 20, 1925.

== Legacy and honors ==
Terrell's obituary was featured in The Crisis, the official magazine of the National Association for the Advancement of Colored People. He is described as "a good fellow...tall and healthy to look at; a lover of men, of his social class, of a good story with a Lincoln tang to it."

In 1931, Howard University Law School closed its evening classes, during a financial pullback because of the Great Depression. That same year, George A. Parker, Philip W. Thomas, Louis R. Mehlinger, Benjamin Gaskins, Chester Jarvis, and Lafayette M. Hershaw founded the Terrell Law School, named in honor of the judge. It served primarily African-American students, who were prevented from attending local white law schools, and provided evening classes from 1931 to 1950. At that time other law schools began to integrate.

In 1952, the Robert H. Terrell Junior High School, named in his honor, opened at 100 Pierce Street, NW, Washington, DC. This school was closed in August 2006, and demolished between November 2007 and June 2008. The site was redeveloped for the R. H. Terrell Recreation Center, also named for him, which opened in 2009. His wife Mary Church Terrell was also honored with a school named for her.
