= Beulah Wright Porter =

American physician (1869–1928)

Beulah Wright Porter Price
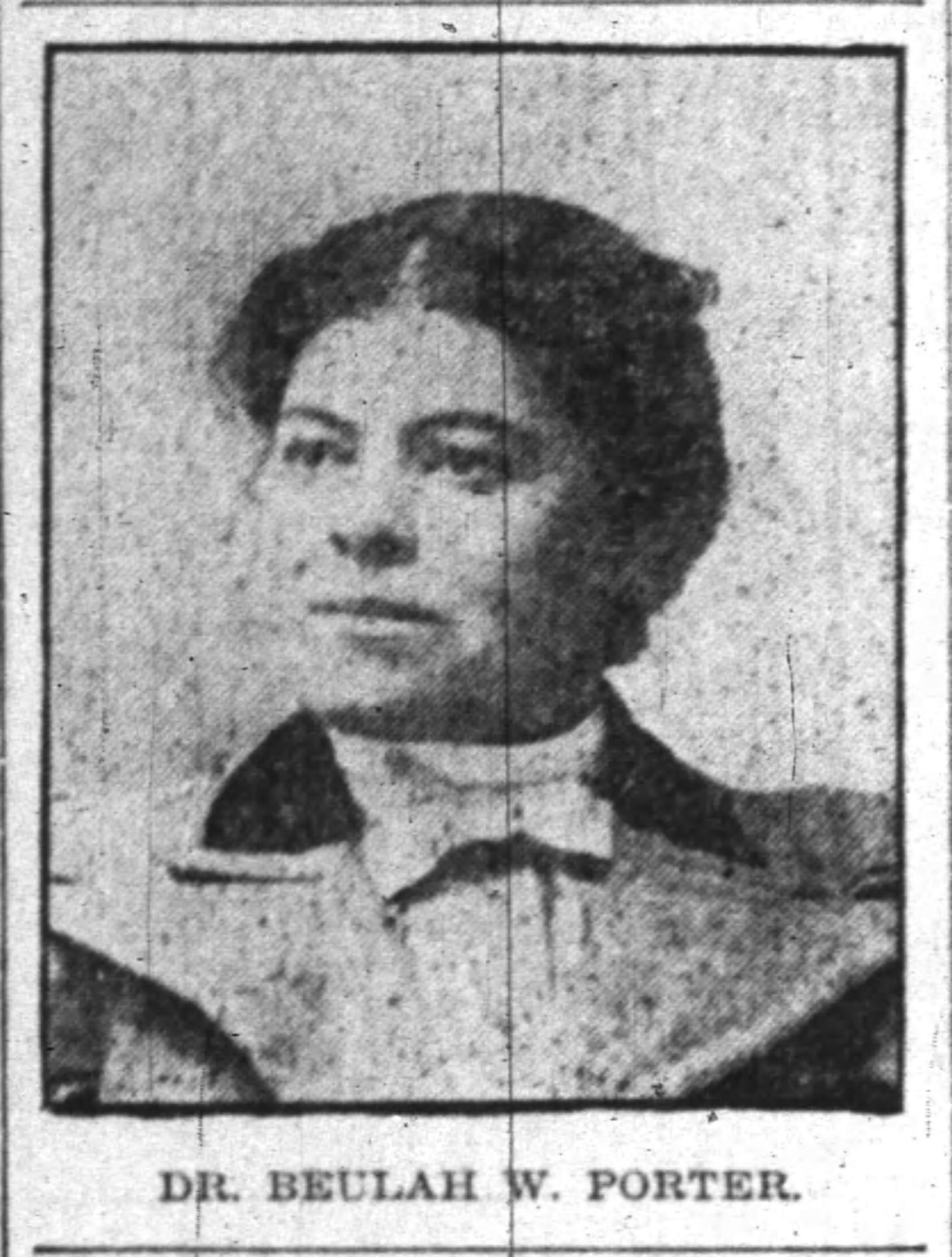
- Portrait of Porter from The Indianapolis News, 1900
- Born: January 2, 1869; St. Louis, Missouri, U.S.
- Died: November 2, 1928 (aged 59)
- Education: Indiana Medical College
- Occupations: physician, educator, philanthropist, clubwoman
- Organization: Woman's Improvement Club (Indianapolis)
- Known for: First African American woman physician in Indianapolis

Beulah Wright Porter Price (1869–1928) was an American educator, physician, philanthropist, and clubwoman. She was the first African American woman physician in Indianapolis, and co-founded the Women's Improvement Club of Indianapolis (WIC) with Lillian Thomas Fox in 1905. She was a member of the African American women's club movement in Indianapolis, Indiana.

As part of the Women's Improvement Club, Porter established Oak Hill Camp, which is believed to be the first outdoor tuberculosis treatment facility in the United States.

== Early life and education ==
Price was born in St. Louis, Missouri, on January 2, 1869. Her mother was a widow and a seamstress. Sometime after 1880, Porter and her mother moved to Indianapolis.

Porter began working as a teacher in Indianapolis Public Schools in 1889. After marrying mail carrier Jefferson D. Porter on March 8, 1893, she left her teaching position and enrolled in Indiana Medical College in Indianapolis (now the Indiana University School of Medicine).

== Career ==
=== Medical practice ===
Porter established a medical practice in Indianapolis in 1897, becoming the first African American woman physician in the city with her own practice. Porter left her medical practice in 1901, a change some historians attribute to the reluctance of patients to be treated by an African American woman doctor.

=== School administration ===
Porter became principal of the Robert Gould Shaw School, a segregated public school in Indianapolis in 1905, position she held for 25 years. Also in 1905, Porter represented Indiana and presented a paper at the Colored National Teachers Convention in Atlanta, Georgia.

=== Activism and philanthropy ===
In 1903, Porter worked with Lillian Thomas Fox to form the Women's Improvement Club (WIC) of Indianapolis. The WIC began as a literary club, but soon became a philanthropic and activist organization. In 1905, the WIC, with the help of Porter's medical expertise, opened Oak Hill Camp, a summer camp for black children with tuberculosis. Historians believe Oak Hill Camp to be the first outdoor tuberculosis treatment facility in the United States. The WIC also trained African American nurses.

In addition to the WIC, Porter was active in other local clubs, including the Grand Body of the Sisters of Charity, a local chapter of the National Association for the Advancement of Colored People, the Mayflowers Club, the Parlour Reading Club, and the sorority Alpha Kappa Alpha. She was also a member of the first management committee for the Phyllis Wheatley YWCA, on which she served as chair of the health committee.

== Private life ==
Porter married Jefferson D. Porter, a mail carrier, on March 8, 1893. The couple eventually divorced, though the exact date of their separation is unknown. By 1910, Porter was no longer living with her husband, and was listed as a boarder at the house of African American physician Joseph H. Ward. She married Walter M. Price, an Indianapolis public school teacher, on November 14, 1914. The couple lived in Indiana Avenue, an African-American neighborhood in Indianapolis, until the 1920s, when they moved to Boulevard Place.

Porter was a member of the Bethel Ame Church, an African Methodist Episcopal church in Indianapolis.

Porter died on November 2, 1928.
