= Roger Arliner Young =

American zoologist

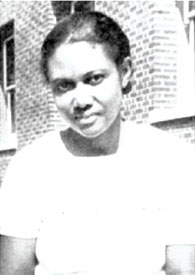
- Born: August 20, 1899; Clifton Forge, Virginia, US
- Died: November 9, 1964 (aged 64–65); New Orleans, Louisiana
- Education: Howard University; University of Chicago; University of Pennsylvania
- Scientific career
- Fields: Zoology, Biology, Marine biology
- Workplaces: Marine Biological Laboratory

Roger Arliner Young (August 20, 1899 – November 9, 1964) was an American scientist of zoology, biology, and marine biology. She was the first African American woman to receive a doctorate degree in zoology.

== Early years ==
Born in Clifton Forge, Virginia in 1899, Young soon moved with her family to Burgettstown, Pennsylvania where she graduated from Burgettstown High School. Her father labored as a coal miner, and her mother initially worked as a housekeeper before disability left her unable to work. The family was poor and most of the time resources were expended in the care of her disabled mother.

== Education ==
In 1916, Young enrolled at Howard University in Washington, D.C. to study music. She wrote in the yearbook: "Not failure, but low aim is a crime." She did not take her first science course until 1921. Though her grades were poor at the beginning of her college career, some of her teachers saw promise in her. One such teacher was Ernest Everett Just, a prominent black biologist and head of the Zoology department at Howard University. Young graduated with a bachelor's degree in 1923. Just tried unsuccessfully to help her to gain funding for graduate school, but in 1924 Young began studying for her master's degree at the University of Chicago, which she received in 1926.

Young worked with Just for many years, teaching as an assistant professor at Howard University, from 1923 to 1935. Research was done during the summers. Young assisted Just in his research from 1927 through 1930, but although her assistance was noted in his grant applications, her name does not appear as a coauthor in the resulting publications.

While studying at Chicago, she was asked to join Sigma Xi, a scientific research society, which was an unusual honor for a master's student. Young was the first Black woman admitted to Sigma Xi. During the time she was concurrently studying for her master's degree, Young conducted research which led to the 1924 her publication, "On the excretory apparatus in Paramecium" which was published in the "Discussion and Correspondence" section of the prestigious journal Science. Young was the sole author on the research article, making her the first African American woman to obtain a professional publication on original research in this field. This publication was revered by leading researchers of the time in the zoology field and was an international success, symbolizing the impact of Young's scientific achievements early in her career. For this research, Just praised her as a “real genius in zoology”. He also said that Young eclipsed him in “technical excellence”.

== Career ==
Ernest Everett Just invited Young to work with him during summers at the Marine Biological Laboratory in Woods Hole, Massachusetts beginning in 1927, making Young the first Black woman to conduct research there. During their time in Woods Hole, Just and Young worked on researching the fertilization process in marine organisms, as well as the process of hydration and dehydration in living cells. While conducting research at the Woods Hole Marine Biological Laboratory, she presented research papers detailing her work there on three occasions, receiving additional funding in the form of three separate grants under the mentorship of Just.

In the late 1920s, Young served as the acting chair for the zoology department at Howard University while Just had travelled to Europe seeking grant money. Young's eyes were permanently damaged by the ultraviolet rays used in the experiments conducted at Howard for Just. During Young's time as acting chair, Just was able to publish a record 20 articles, a level of productivity he did not reach before or after working with Young.

In the fall of 1930, Young returned to the University of Chicago to begin her doctorate degree under the direction of Frank Rattray Lillie. Lillie had been a mentor of Just while both were involved with the Marine Biological Laboratory. However, in 1930 she failed to pass her qualifying exams, and for a time, disappeared from the scientific community. She returned to Howard University to teach and continued working with Just at the Marine Biological Laboratory during the summers.

However, around 1934, rumors started circulating that there was a romance between Just and Young, and in 1936 they had a huge confrontation. Later that year Young was fired, ostensibly because she missed classes. In her words, "The situation here is so cruel and cowardly that every spark of sentiment that I have held for Howard is cold." Whether related to academic performance or a romantic conflict, Just had created a paper trail of complaints surrounding Young leading up to 1936 painting her performance as disruptive to the smooth operation of research and teaching at Howard University. He restricted Young's access to important research equipment, and finally in 1936, used his trail of evidence to fire Young. Young had this to say on the subject: “You seem to be making a deliberate effort to keep me from doing any research while in residence in your department. This type of thing is so averse to a true scientific or real university spirit that for a long time I have tried not to believe that it is the correct expression of your sincere attitude.” —Roger Arliner Young to Ernest Everett Just, May 6, 1935.

She used this setback as an opportunity to try again to obtain a Ph.D. after ending her association with Howard. In June 1937, she went to the University of Pennsylvania, studying with Lewis Victor Heilbrunn (another scientist she met at the Marine Biological Laboratory). After this leave of absence from Just's supposed tutelage, Young was able to earn her PhD in zoology, graduating in 1940, and earning her the title of the first African American woman to earn a PhD in zoology. Young co-authored two papers with Heilbrunn.

After obtaining her doctorate, Young became an assistant professor at the North Carolina College for Negroes and Shaw University (1940–1947). Although this position came at a $700 per year pay decrease in relation to her position at Howard University, Young and her mother rented a house in the nearby Hayti district and continued her career here. Later in her scientific career, Roger Young held teaching positions at Bishop College in Marshall, Texas in 1953, Paul Quinn University in Waco, Texas in 1955, and at colleges in Mississippi and Louisiana until 1959. In 1960, Roger Young found employment as a professor of Science at Jackson State University.

Young contributed a great deal of work to science. She studied the effects of direct and indirect radiation on sea urchin eggs, on the structures that control the salt concentration in paramecium, as well as hydration and dehydration of living cells.

== Personal life ==
Young never married and in addition to the occupation-related damage to her eyes, she had financial struggles, and was the sole support for her ill mother, Lillie Young, until she died. Away from Howard, her options as an African-American woman scientist were limited to teaching positions without access to research facilities and support.

Her limited financial resources did not stop Young from being an active member of her community, as she has been noted as being active in community service and arts programs throughout her life. During her time at Howard University, Young was an active member of the Dunbar Players, a university-affiliated drama troupe. Additionally at Howard, Young held a position as President of the Women's Faculty Club, during which time she met Eleanor Roosevelt in 1935 with whom she continued correspondence. Later, Young continued her community service on the Phyllis Wheatley YWCA, one of the first YWCAs in the United States to serve “Colored” women, as an active member of their social service committee.

Young was a strong advocate for labour rights and racial justice. Following the 1944 murder of a black man by a white bus driver, which was largely ignored, Young was elected secretary of the Durham, North Carolina chapter of the NAACP. She also joined the board of directors of the Harriet Tubman YWCA in Durham, a major site of organizing for civil and women's rights activism, and became an organiser of black workers in the Tobacco Workers International Union (TWIU).

While traveling by bus through Nashville, North Carolina in July 1946 to meet with tobacco workers as a TWIU organiser, Young refused to give up her seat for a white man and move to the back of the bus. The bus driver called the police, who dragged her from the bus and threw her into a police car. When she refused to apologize in exchange for charges being dropped, Young was transferred to the county jail.

In the 1950s, she hospitalized herself for mental health problems. It was reported by biographer Kenneth Manning that Young spent some time near the end of her life at the Mississippi State Asylum. Additionally, Young's mother, whom Young cared for throughout her life, died in 1953. Roger Arliner Young died on November 9, 1964 at Charity Hospital in New Orleans, Louisiana.

== Honors ==
Roger Arliner Young was recognized in a 2005 Congressional Resolution along with four other African American women "who have broken through many barriers to achieve greatness in science." The others honored were Ruth Ella Moore ("who in 1933 became the first African American woman to earn a Ph.D. in natural science from the Ohio State University"), Euphemia Lofton Haynes ("who in 1943 became the first African American woman to receive a Ph.D. in mathematics from the Catholic University of America"), Shirley Ann Jackson ("who in 1973 became the first African American woman to receive a Ph.D. in physics from the Massachusetts Institute of Technology"), and Mae Jemison ("a physician and the first African American woman in space").

A group of environmental and conservation groups established the Roger Arliner Young (RAY) Marine Conservation Diversity Fellowship in Young's honor, to support young African Americans who want to become involved in marine environmental conservation work.

== Works ==
- Young, RA (September 12, 1924). "On the Excretory Apparatus in Paramecium". Science. 60 (1550): 244. Bibcode:1924Sci....60..244Y. doi:10.1126/science.60.1550.244. PMID 17814573.
- L. V. Heilbrunn & R. A. Young (1930). "The action of ultra-violet rays on Arbacia egg protoplasm". Physiological Zoology. 3 (3): 330–341. doi:10.1086/physzool.3.3.30151104. JSTOR 30151104. S2CID 88314531.
- Heilbrunn, L.V.; Young, R.A. (1935). "Indirect Effects Of Radiation On Sea Urchin Eggs". The Biological Bulletin. 69 (2): 274–278. doi:10.2307/1537426. JSTOR 1537426.
- Costello, D.P. & R. A. Young (1939). "The mechanism of membrane elevation in the egg of Nereis (abstract)". Biological Bulletin. 77: 311.
- Young, Roger Arliner (1940). The indirect effects of roentgen rays on certain marine eggs. Thesis (Ph.D.)--Graduate School of Arts and Sciences, University of Pennsylvania.

== See also ==
- List of Howard University people
- Ruth Ella Moore, the first black woman in the United States to receive a doctoral degree in bacteriology (in 1933, from Ohio State University)
- Roger Arliner Young, a brief bio from Infoplease.
- Black Biography: Roger Arliner Young from Answers.com.
- Kenneth R. Manning (1983). Black Apollo of Science: The Life of Ernest Everett Just. Oxford University Press. ISBN 9780199763337.
- Roger Arliner Young, Scientist, by Kenneth R. Manning for Sage: A Scholarly Journal of Black Women, 6: 3–7, 1989.
- Black Stars: African American Women Scientists and Inventors, by Otha Richard Sullivan, Jossey-Bass Publishers, 2001.
