= Indiana State Federation of Colored Women's Clubs =

- U.S. National Register of Historic Places
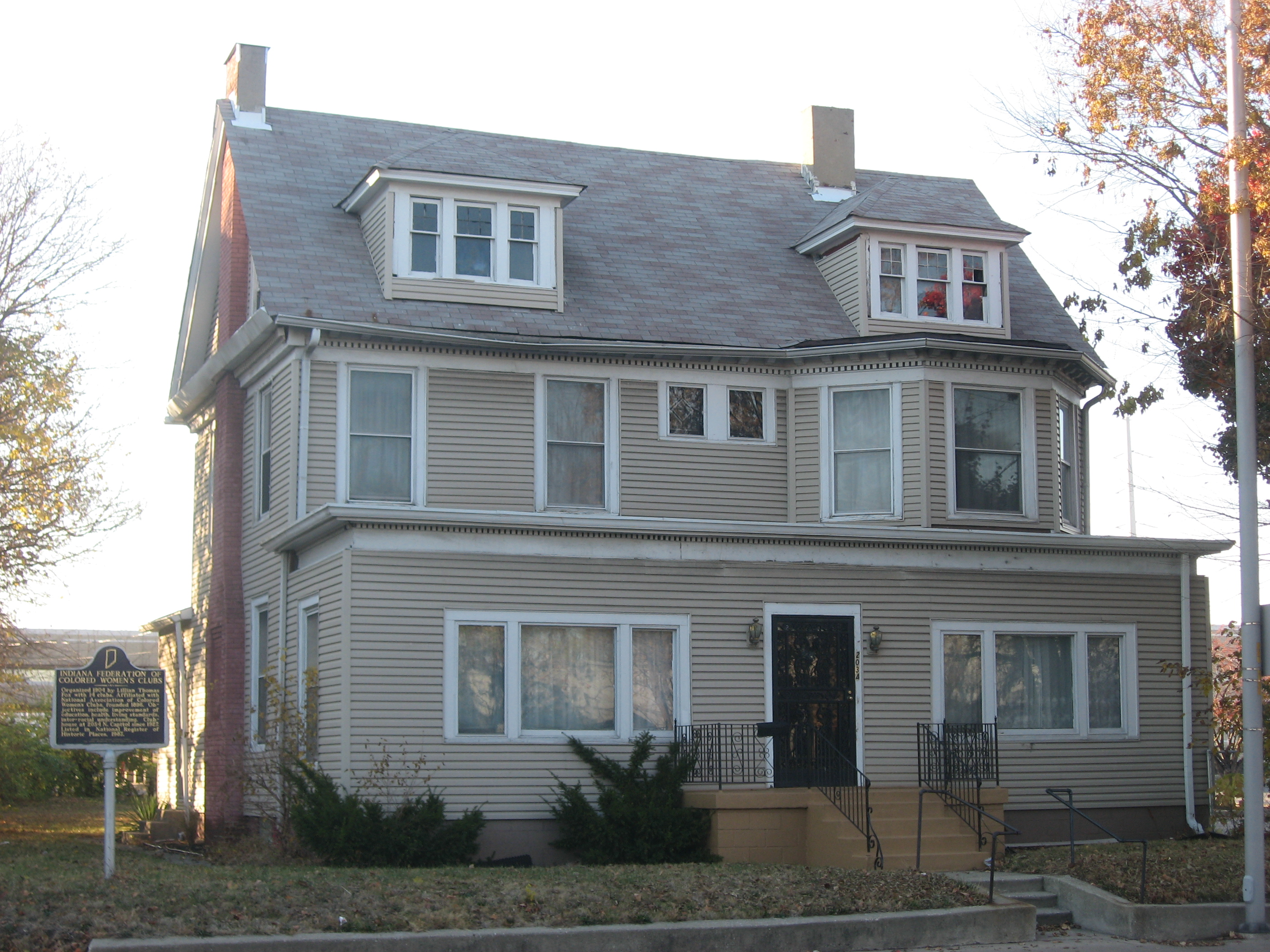
- Indiana State Federation of Colored Women's Clubs, November 2010

- Location within Indianapolis Location within Indiana Location within the United States
- Location: 2034 North Capitol Avenue, Indianapolis, Indiana
- Coordinates: 39°47′37″N 86°9′42″W
- Area: 0.5 acres (0.20 ha)
- Built: 1897
- Built by: Shellhouse & Co.
- Architectural style: Colonial Revival
- NRHP reference No.: 87000512
- Added to NRHP: April 7, 1987

Indiana State Federation of Colored Women's Clubs, also known as the Minor House, is a historic National Association of Colored Women's Clubs clubhouse in Indianapolis, Indiana. The two-and-one-half-story "T"-plan building was originally constructed in 1897 as a private dwelling for John and Sarah Minor; however, since 1927 it has served as the headquarters of the Indiana State Federation of Colored Women's Clubs, a nonprofit group of African American women. The Indiana federation was formally organized on April 27, 1904, in Indianapolis and incorporated in 1927. The group's Colonial Revival style frame building sits on a brick foundation and has a gable roof with hipped dormers. It was listed on the National Register of Historic Places in 1987.

Local newspaper columnist Lillian Thomas Fox of Indianapolis served as the federation's state organizer and honorary president. The Indiana group became an affiliate of the National Association of Colored Women's Clubs, which was formed in 1896. The state federation organized local clubs of black clubwomen, hosted annual state conventions, published a monthly newsletter, sponsored fund-raising activities, and established a scholarship fund. It also shared information on social issues facing Indiana's black community. By 1924 the Indiana federation had eighty-nine clubs with a combined membership of 1,670, but membership has declined in recent decades. Sallie Wyatt Stewart of Evansville, Indiana, who served as the Indiana federation's third president (1921–28), succeeded Mary McLeod Bethune as president of the NACWC in 1928.

== Club history ==
=== Founding in Indianapolis ===
According to the Indianapolis Recorder, efforts to establish a federation of all-black women's clubs in Indiana began after Elizabeth L. Davis, national organizer of the National Association of Colored Women's Clubs, spoke at a rally held at Bethel A.M.E. Church in Indianapolis, Indiana, on February 4, 1904. Less than two weeks later, on February 12, 1904, Indianapolis News columnist Lillian Thomas Fox, the state organizer for the NACWC and a black clubwomen who founded the Woman's Improvement Club of Indianapolis, organized a preliminary meeting at Flanner House in Indianapolis. Forty-two representatives from fourteen of Indiana's black women's clubs attended the gathering to consider forming a statewide organization.

The Indiana Federation of Colored Women's Clubs was formally organized on April 27, 1904, at the end of a two-day state convention held at Bethel A.M.E. Church with nineteen clubs and sixty-eight delegates in attendance. The gathering included representatives from thirteen clubs from Indianapolis, two from Marion, and one each from South Bend, Anderson, Muncie, and Terre Haute.

The Indiana federation also became an affiliate of the National Association of Colored Women's Clubs, which was formed in 1896. The NACWC, which had about 600 clubs at the time the Indiana federation was formed, helped focus nationwide attention on black clubwomen's activities. Fox served as the state organizer and the Indiana federation's honorary president until her death in 1917.

=== Activities and leadership ===
The state federation's initial purpose was organizing Indiana's black women's clubs, publicizing club activities around the state, and promoting the black community in general. The federation's motto was: "Step by step we reach the heights." Its efforts later expanded to provide a network and forum for club members to share information on social issues, such as opposition to lynching, racism, discrimination, and inequality, as well as other concerns, including as "housing, unemployment, education, and healthcare." The Indiana federation also collected membership dues from individuals, held annual state conventions, published a monthly newsletter called The Hoosier Woman, sponsored junior clubs for children, and established a scholarship fund. In addition, it contributed to the Frederick Douglass National Historic Site in Washington, D.C.

From 1904 to 1907, Ella Herrold (sometimes spelled Harrell) of Muncie served as the Indiana federation's first president. Its second president was Minnie Scott of Anderson, who served from 1907 to 1914, followed by Gertrude Hill of Indianapolis from 1914 to 1921 and Sallie Wyatt Stewart of Evansville, Indiana, from 1921 to 1928. In addition to her leadership role in the state federation, Stewart succeeded Mary McLeod Bethune as president of the NACWC from 1928 to 1933. Stewart was also a delegate to the International Council of Women's gathering in 1930 at Vienna, Austria. Carrie Crump of Indianapolis succeeded Steward as president of the Indiana federation in 1928.

During its early years, the Indiana federation began fund-raising efforts to purchase a building for use as a state headquarters, but the clubwomen initially met in members' homes. In 1927 the state federation filed incorporation papers and made a down payment to purchase the former residence of John and Sarah Minor on North Capitol Avenue in Indianapolis. The federation paid off the mortgage on the property in 1945. To celebrate the occasion during its annual meeting that year, federation members burned the mortgage papers on the front lawn of its headquarters.

=== Membership ===
By 1914 the Indiana federation included ninety-seven clubs and 1,568 members. Although it had eighty-nine clubs with a combined membership of 1,670 by 1924, the federation's membership declined during the Great Depression to fifty-six clubs in 1933. Membership also dwindled in subsequent decades.

== Building history and description ==
The clubhouse was erected in 1897 at 2034 North Capitol Avenue in Indianapolis, Indiana. It was initially built as a private dwelling for John W. and Sarah P. Minor, the original owners. John Minor was a self-taught lawyer who established the Sentinel Printing Company in Indianapolis in 1883. He served as company secretary-treasurer from 1884 to 1922, and as the company president for the two years prior to his death in 1924. His widow, Sarah, and daughter, Caroline Rodecker, lived in the home until the Indiana State Federation of Colored Women's Clubs purchased it in 1927. Since that time the building has served as the Indiana federation's headquarters. The clubhouse was listed on the National Register of Historic Places in 1987. The Indiana Historical Bureau and the Indiana Federation of Colored Women's Clubs erected a state historical marker at the site in 1997.

The two-and-one-half-story frame building sits on a brick foundation. It has a gable roof with hipped dormers, an enclosed front porch, and a two-story rear wing. The "T"-plan, Colonial Revival-style home is covered in siding. A carriage house once stood at the rear of the property.

The clubhouse's main facade (east side) has two dormers, each one with three double-hung sash windows. The two-story bay window is now only visible on the second story due to the enclosed front porch. The second story also has two fixed-sash windows and two double-hung windows. The one-story front porch contains the main entrance and two picture windows. The building's south facade has double-hung windows flanking a chimney on all three floors. It also had an enclosed porch, which was later converted to a bathroom. The west facade (rear of the building) has an exterior brick chimney, sash windows, an enclosed back porch, a two-story wing, and a one-story plywood addition on a brick foundation. The north facade has an oriel window, in addition to two fixed-sash windows above two double-hung windows.

The clubhouse's interior includes a large meeting room on the first floor. The main space includes two fireplaces, one each on the west and south sides of the room. The building also has two stairways, one at the front and another at the rear of the building.

== See also ==
- National Register of Historic Places listings in Center Township, Marion County, Indiana
