= Lillian Thomas Fox =

African-American journalist, clubwoman, public speaker, civic activist

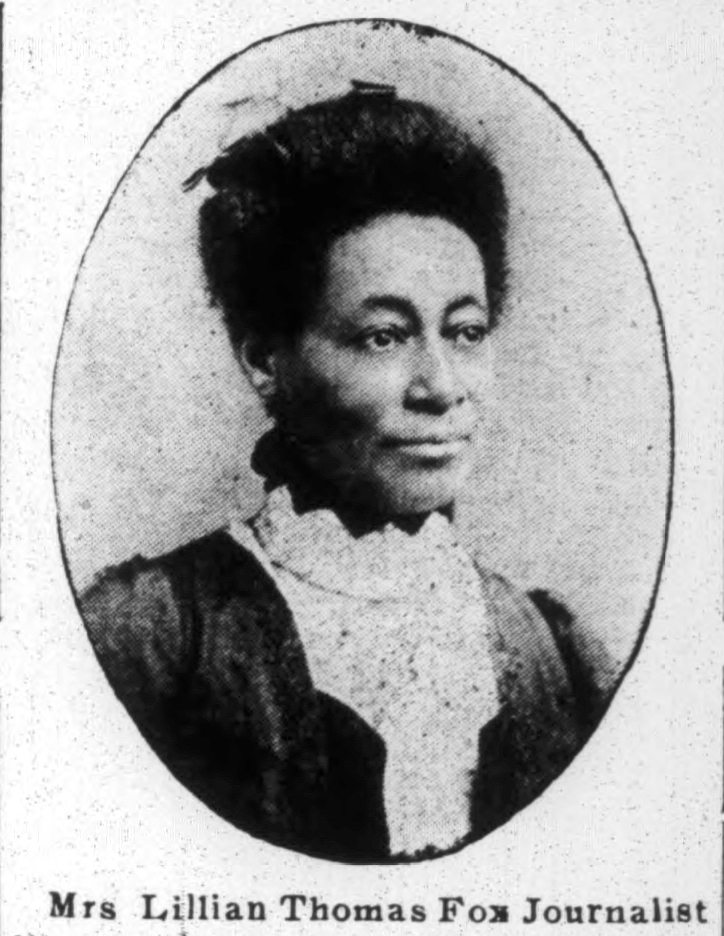
- Lillian Thomas Fox in 1905, around age 51.
- Born: November 1854; Chicago, Illinois
- Died: August 29, 1917 (aged 62); Indianapolis, Indiana
- Resting place: Crown Hill Cemetery and Arboretum Sec F, Lot 5906; 39.82341°N 86.179588°W
- Occupations: Journalist, clubwoman, and civic activist
- Employer(s): Indianapolis Freeman; Indianapolis News
- Organization(s): Woman's Improvement Club; Indiana State Federation of Colored Women's Clubs
- Spouse: Wm. R. James (married in 1872, divorced in 1880) Charles M. Thomas (married in 1881, divorced in 1889) James E. Fox (married in 1893, separated in 1898)
- Children: Maud (Maudie) Thomas, (1872-1889)
- Parent(s): Rev. Byrd Parker; Jane Janette (Johnson) Thomas

Lillian May Parker Thomas Fox (November 1854 – August 29, 1917) was an African American journalist, clubwoman, public speaker, and civic activist in Indianapolis, Indiana, who rose to prominence in the 1880s and 1890s as a writer for the Indianapolis Freeman, a leading national black newspaper. In 1900, Fox joined the Indianapolis News, becoming the first African American columnist to regularly write for a white newspaper in Indiana. She was inducted into the Indiana Journalism Hall of Fame in 2014.

Fox used her writing, public speaking, and strong organizational skills to promote the goals and interests of several organizations in Indianapolis's black community. In 1903, Fox co-founded the Woman's Improvement Club of Indianapolis with Beulah Wright Porter. Fox was also the leader of a group that founded the Indiana State Federation of Colored Women's Clubs in 1904. Fox also advocated for improvements in public health and care for tuberculosis patients in Indianapolis's black community. She was also involved in national organizations, such as the National Afro-American Council, the Indianapolis Anti-Lynching League, and the National Association of Colored Women's Clubs, among others.

== Early life and education ==
Born in November 1854 in Chicago, Illinois, Fox grew up in Oshkosh, Wisconsin. Her parents were Jane Janette (Johnson), a teacher, and Reverend Byrd Parker, a pastor at Quinn African Methodist Episcopal Church. Reverend Parker died in 1860. After her widowed mother married Robert E. Thomas, a barber in Oshkosh. She had at least two siblings. Little is known about her older brother; her younger brother was Charles T. Thomas. Her mother and younger brother died of tuberculosis within two days of each other in January 1894.

Thomas learned to read and write at an early age, and attended public schools in Oshkosh, Wisconsin. After moving with her mother to Indianapolis, Indiana, in the 1880s, she studied at the Indiana-Boston School of Elocution and the Indianapolis Institute for Young Ladies.

== Marriage and family ==
On July 31, 1872, she married Wm. R. James in Oshkosh, Wisconsin. She gave birth to her daughter Maud that same year. By 1880, Lillian had separated from Wm. James though she retained his last name. The 1880 Census lists Lillian M. James as the head of her household in Oshkosh, Wisconsin, with Maud (7 years old) at school. Her divorce from Wm. R. James was recorded in the Oshkosh Northwestern on September 10, 1880.

Lillian's second marriage was to Charles M. Thomas, and was reported on March 30, 1881, in the Weekly Wisconsin. According to the marriage certificate, Charles M. Thomas was a barber in Augusta, Wisconsin; he had been born in Goldenville, Virginia. Lillian's mother Jane and her sister Dora were both witnesses to the marriage.

Lillian and her daughter Maud (Maudie) moved to Indianapolis in 1885, as did Lillian's mother Jane. Soon thereafter Lillian sought a divorce from Charles M. Thomas. The court granted that divorce in 1889, as reported on February 13, 1889, in the Indianapolis Journal.

In November 1889, Lillian's daughter died of tuberculosis. The report in The Freeman, stated "Miss Maudie Thomas, the only daughter of Mrs. Lillian Thomas, died of consumption last Monday."

After her daughter's death, Lillian Thomas would go on to live a very public life. She also chose to keep private the details about her two first marriages and her daughter Maudie, as none of these aspects of her life were included in published biographies.

Lillian Thomas's third marriage was to James E. Fox. They married on May 25, 1893, at her home in Indianapolis. Fox was a Jamaican merchant and tailor in Pensacola, Florida, who moved to Indianapolis and opened a shop on Indiana Avenue. Thomas stopped working outside the home after her marriage, but continued to do public speaking. The couple had no children. After the couple's separation and James's death in 1898, Lillian resumed her a career as a journalist. She also became an active clubwomen in Indianapolis's black community.

== Career ==
Fox began her career as a public speaker and freelance writer, but rose to prominence in the 1880s and 1890s as a civic leader and journalist for the Indianapolis Freeman, a leading national black newspaper at the time. In 1900 Fox joined the Indianapolis News, becoming the state's first black columnist to regularly write for a white newspaper. Fox was also an active clubwoman in Indianapolis's black community. She was the co-founder with Beulah Wright Porter of the Woman's Improvement Club of Indianapolis in 1903. Fox also lead the group that founded the Indiana State Federation of Colored Women's Clubs in 1904. She was especially active as an advocate for improving access to public health and securing better care for tuberculosis patients in Indianapolis's black community.

=== Early years ===
When Fox moved to Indianapolis in 1885, she earned income as a seamstress while working as a freelance writer for black newspapers. In 1891 she passed the civil service entrance examination, which qualified her for a clerkship, but she instead pursued a career as a journalist, public speaker, and social activist in Indianapolis.

=== Journalist and public speaker ===
In September 1891, the Indianapolis Freeman hired Fox as an assistant corresponding editor. She continued writing for the newspaper until 1893. At the Freeman, where she was the only woman on the editorial staff, her writings favored Booker T. Washington's approach to black economic progress. Fox resigned from the newspaper when she married, but continued to work as a public speaker. She was also an active member of Bethel African Methodist Episcopal Church, as well as other organizations in the black community of Indianapolis. After the couple separated and her husband died in 1898, Fox resumed to her career as a journalist.

In 1900, after Fox addressed the Afro-American Press Association's annual meeting in Indianapolis on the topic of women in journalism, the Indianapolis News hired her as a correspondent. Fox became the first African American to write a regular news column for a white newspaper in Indiana. For fifteen years, Fox wrote a weekly column about the activities of the local black community. She also used her position as a journalist to support and encourage efforts to advance the initiatives of several black community organizations.

Fox's pioneering column in the Indianapolis News, which was called "News of the Colored Folk," ran from 1900 to 1915, but she did not write under a byline. Her column covered local events in the black community and articles on local black men and women, as well as reports on national black events. Through her regular articles, Fox shared information related to social issues and supported efforts to improve health, nutrition, maternal care, childcare, and senior care for Indianapolis residents.

=== Clubwoman ===
Fox became a well-known speaker and social activist. She founded the Woman's Improvement Club of Indianapolis and the Indiana State Federation of Colored Women's Clubs, as well as becoming involved in several national organizations. Fox was a state representative to the National Afro-American Council's executive committee, a member of the Indianapolis Anti-Lynching League, and active in the National Association of Colored Women's Clubs, among other groups.

In December 1895, Fox was invited to speak at the Atlanta Congress of Colored Women, a gathering of black women activists. The goal of the conference was to encourage the organization of women's and children's clubs around the country. Fox became interested in implementing the idea in Indianapolis as a result of the meeting. In 1903, after she attended a gathering of the National Association of Colored Women's Clubs in Detroit, Fox and Beulah Wright Porter founded the Woman's Improvement Club for African American women in Indianapolis.

The Woman's Improvement Club of socially prominent black women was initially established as a literary group. It provided its members with a chance to express themselves and improve their education, as well as offering mutual support and encouragement. The club's goals soon expanded to include social work and support of the war effort during World War I. The Woman's Improvement Club was especially active and best known for its fundraising work to secure healthcare for tuberculosis patients in the city's black community, as well as assistance to impoverished black residents. As part of its philanthropic efforts, the club established Oak Hill Camp, one of the first outdoor fresh air camps for tuberculosis patients in the country.

In 1904, Fox led the group of women that founded the Indiana State Federation of Colored Women's Clubs, a consortium of fourteen black women's clubs in the state. Fox initially served as the federation's state organizer and remained an honorary president until her death in 1917.

In addition to her activities with local women's clubs, Fox was active as a speaker on behalf of political and religious groups, as well as a leader in other community organizations. Fox was a member of Bethel AME Church's literary group, the Bethel Christian Endeavor Society, the Alpha Home Association, and a superintendent at the Sisters of Charity Hospital in Indianapolis.

== Later years ==
Suffering from failing eyesight and general ill health, Fox took a leave of absence from the Indianapolis News in 1914. Unable to continue writing, she retired from the News in 1915.

== Death and legacy ==
Fox had a stroke in August 1917 and died of a heart attack at a friend's home in Indianapolis. Fox is buried at Crown Hill Cemetery in Indianapolis.

Following her death, the Indianapolis Freeman described Fox as "an original thinker" and an advocate for social justice. Her work at the Indianapolis News as the first African American journalist to write a regular column in one the state's white newspapers lead the way for other black journalists.

In addition to her writing, Fox was known for her public speaking and strong organizational skills, which she used to promote the goals and interests of several organizations in the black community. Her particular interest in tuberculosis and healthcare for black patients continued after her death through the Woman's Improvement Club and other groups with whom Fox collaborated, such as the Indianapolis Flower Mission Hospital, the Flanner House Tuberculosis Clinic, and the Sisters of Charity Hospital.

== Honors and awards ==
Fox was posthumously inducted into the Indiana Journalism Hall of Fame in 2014.

== Corrections to previous records ==
Recent research has revealed that at least one of the photographs largely associated with Lillian Thomas Fox is actually not her. It also unclear, and rather unlikely, if an additional photograph at the Library of Congress is in fact her.

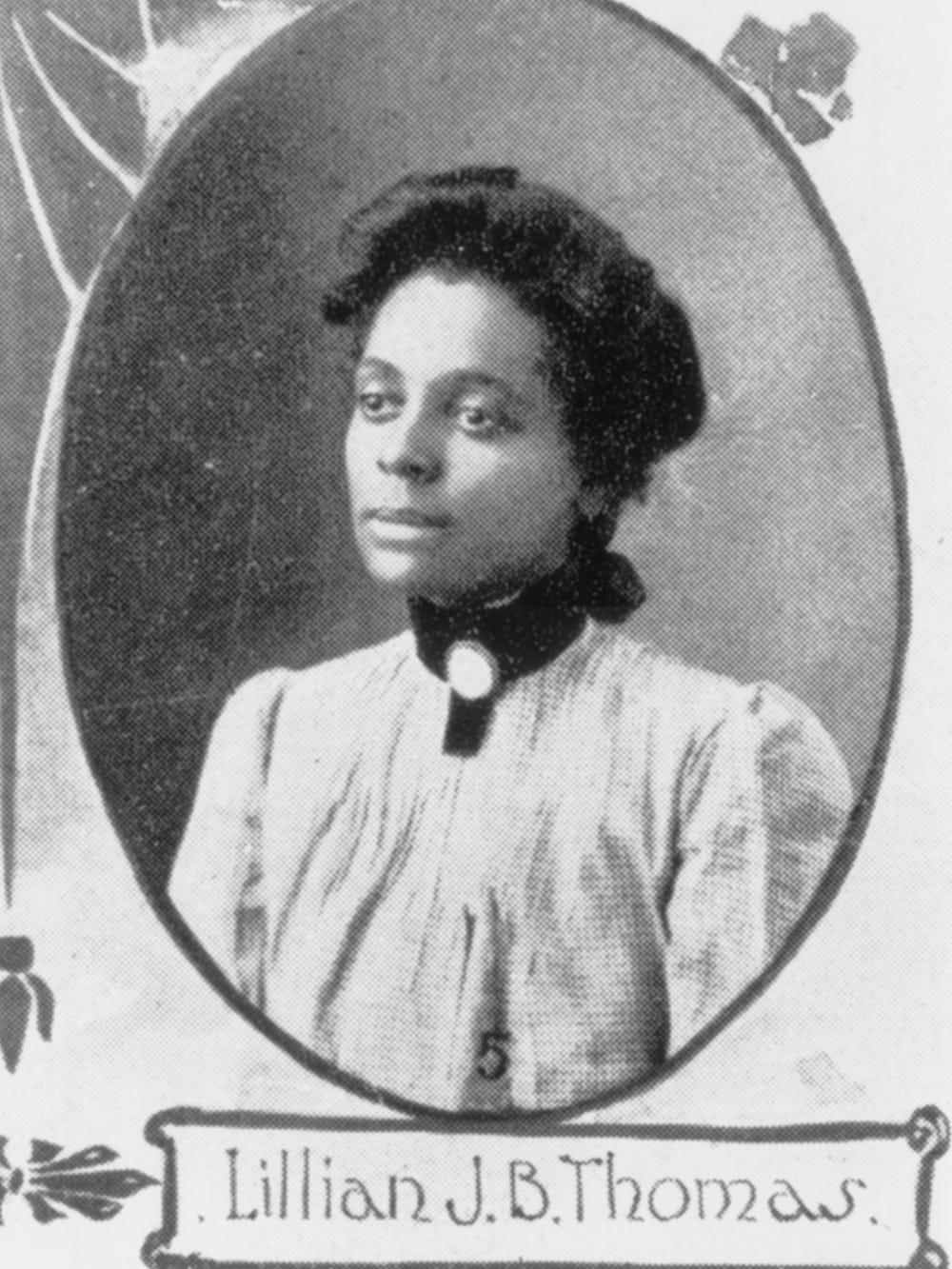
This image has been associated with Lillian Thomas Fox, but it is actually a photograph of a different woman. Lillian J.B. Thomas was a stenographer in Lexington, Kentucky. She appears in the 1900 Census as a "Recorder of Fact." This image of her was published in the 1905 book, The Colored American From Slavery to Honest Citizenship.

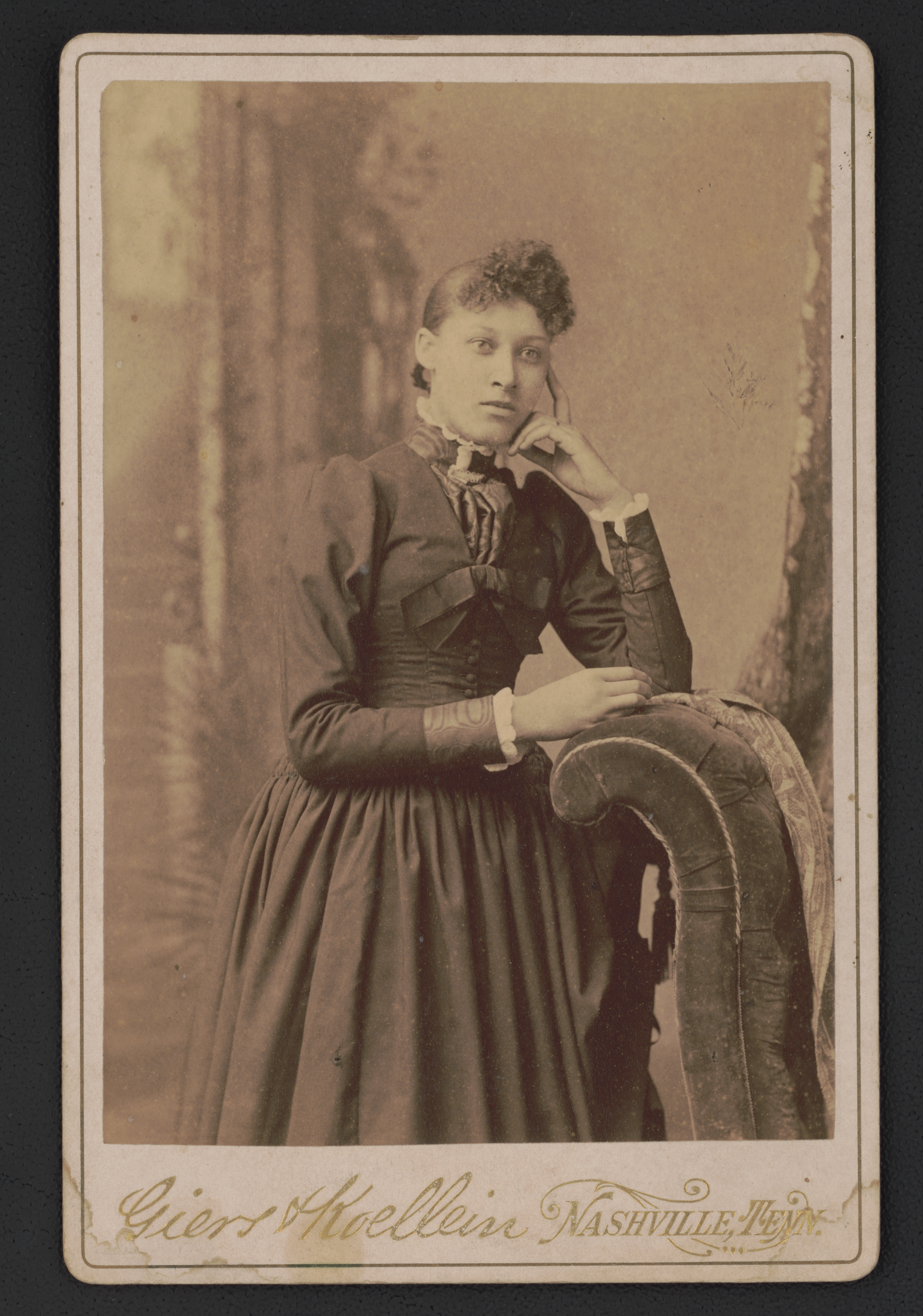
This image is archived by The Library of Congress. It is questionable if the photograph is actually Lillian Thomas Fox. For one, if the date of 1890 is accurate, Lillian Thomas Fox would have been in her mid-thirties at the time. The woman in the image appears younger than that.
