= Phyllis Wheatley YWCA =

Phyllis Wheatley YWCA may refer to:

- Phyllis Wheatley YWCA (Indianapolis)
- Phyllis Wheatley YWCA (St. Louis)
- Phyllis Wheatley YWCA (Washington, D.C)
