= Grand Body of the Sisters of Charity =

Grand Body of the Sisters of Charity was founded by Celeste Allen, Eliza Goff, Ada Goins, Beulah Wright Porter and Hulda Bates Webb in Indianapolis, Indiana, in 1874 in response to the large number of African Americans moving to central Indiana from the South after the American Civil War. From its inception, the mission of the organization was to provide for those in need. The charitable organization, which disbanded around 1980, worked to provide healthcare to new Indiana residents. The Grand Body of the Sisters of Charity assisted the poor by providing at-home nursing care, raised funds to funds to pay for medical treatments, and distributed clothing and food. In the early 1910s the women raised funds to establish a small, fourteen-bed hospital for African Americans; however, it closed for financial reasons after ten years of operation. The Grand Body of the Sisters of Charity encouraged the development of other African American women's clubs in the city. Subsequent clubs that followed their lead in Indianapolis included the Alpha Home Association and the Women's Improvement Club, among others. After 1900, the Grand Body of the Sisters of Charity funded its philanthropic projects through a group of lodges the organization established around the state, but the number of lodges began to decline in the 1920s and during the Great Depression. The Sisters of Charity disbanded around 1980. During a 1989 interview, President Rubie Potter stated that the organization consolidated down to one Lodge (No. 15) in 1980 after members disagreed about selling state headquarters and discontinuing operations. That building still stands at 1034-1036 Martin Luther King, Jr. Drive in Indianapolis, Indiana.
