= Sallie Wyatt Stewart =

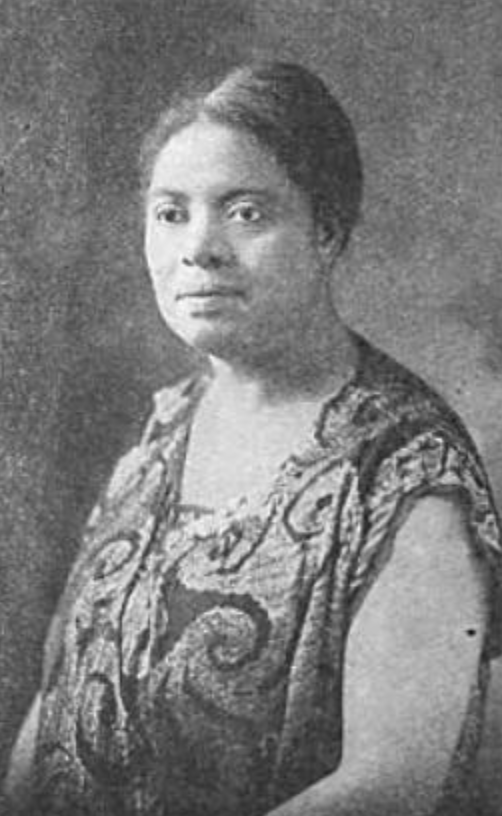
- Sallie Wyatt Stewart, from a 1929 publication
- Born: January 3, 1881; Ensley, Tennessee
- Died: July 1951; Evansville, Indiana
- Occupation: Educator
- Spouse: Logan Henry Stewart
- Parent(s): Armstead and Eliza (Jones) Wyatt

Sallie Wyatt Stewart (January 3, 1881 – July 1951) was an American educator and a social services organizer for the black community in Evansville, Indiana, who is best known for her leadership in local, state, and national black women's clubs. Stewart served as president of the Indiana Federation of Colored Women from 1921 to 1928 and succeeded Mary McLeod Bethune as president of the National Association of Colored Women from 1928 to 1933. During her term as the IFCW's president, Stewart launched "The Hoosier Woman", a monthly newsletter that served as the organization's official publication. Among her accomplishments as the NACW's president was the founding in 1930 of the National Association of Colored Girls. In addition, Stewart was a delegate in 1930 to the International Council of Women in Vienna, Austria, and fourth vice president of the National Council of Women of the United States. She also served a trustee and secretary of the Frederick Douglass Memorial and Historical Association, a member of the executive committee of the National Negro Business League, a member of the executive committee of the National Colored Merchants Association, and a teacher in the Evansville public schools for more than fifty years.

The Tennessee native migrated to Evansville, Indiana, during her youth and worked in domestic service before becoming a teacher and developing a real estate business with her husband. Stewart's philanthropic efforts also began in Evansville. In the 1910s and 1920s, she established along with other women the Evansville Federation of Colored Women, a women's service organization; the Day Nursery Association for Colored Children, a local child care center; the Phyllis Wheatley Home, a recreation center and boardinghouse for young women; and the Evansville Colored Association of College Women's Clubs, among others. Stewart was also a charter member and first secretary of the Evansville chapter of the National Association for the Advancement of Colored People; served in 1927 as an officer on the Evansville Inter-Racial Commission; and in 1928 chaired an auxiliary of the tuberculosis association of Vanderburgh County, Indiana. During World War II, she organized the Colored Women's War Work Committee in Evansville, which sold war bonds and stamps.

== Early life and education ==
Sallie Wyatt was born in Ensley, Tennessee on January 3, 1881, to Armstead and Eliza (Jones) Wyatt and moved with the family to Evansville, Indiana, in 1883. Shortly after the family's arrival in Indiana, Armstead Wyatt became disabled. Working as domestics, Sallie Wyatt and her mother supported themselves, Sallie's invalid father, and Sallie's seven younger siblings.

Wyatt, who grew up in poverty in Evansville's black community, continued to work as a domestic while attending the city's public schools. In 1897, at the age of sixteen, she graduated from Governor High School in Evansville as valedictorian of her eleven-member class. Wyatt also worked while pursuing additional studies to become a teacher. She attended Evansville Norman School, a two-year teacher training school, and continued her education with summer courses at the University of Chicago from 1909 until 1911 and in 1927, 1929, and 1930. She also took classes during the fall semesters at Indiana University-Evansville from 1930 to 1935.

== Marriage and family ==
On November 30, 1911, Sallie Wyatt married Logan Henry Stewart, a real estate agent based in Evansville. The couple had no children. Over the years, the Stewarts continued to develop their real estate business, which Sallie continued to manage after her husband's death.

== Career ==
=== Educator ===
After earning a teaching certificate, Stewart began a fifty-year career as a teacher in the Evansville public schools at the first grade through high school levels for most of her adult life. From 1924 to 1928, she was dean of girls at Evansville's Douglass High School and from 1928 to 1951 as dean of girls at the city's Lincoln High School. At Lincoln, she also introduced classes in domestic science, stenography, and mental hygiene.

=== Civic activist ===
As Stewart worked to elevate herself from the poverty of her youth, she became more involved in efforts to improve the lives of other members of Evansville's the black community. Stewart, a member of Grace Lutheran Church in Evansville, joined the Elizabeth Chapter of the Prince Hall Order of the Eastern Star. By 1912 she had begun to devote more of her energy to black social service work in Evansville.

Stewart became a charter member of the Evansville chapter of the National Association for the Advancement of Colored People around 1915 and served as the local chapter's first secretary. A year later, Stewart and a group of black women founded the Day Nursery Association for Colored Children in Evansville, which opened in early 1919. The women raised about $2,000 for a down payment to purchase a nine-room home where a daily average of 29 children of all ages were cared for, some of them overnight, so that their mothers could work. Shortly thereafter, Stewart and a group of black women in the Evansville community established a Girls' Protective League. This organization raised funds to purchase a building to serve as a recreation center and boardinghouse for young women coming to Evansville for work or to attend school. The Phyllis Wheatly Home in Evansville opened in November 1922. By the 1930s, about 400 young women were participating in the home's activities.

Through her early civic and philanthropic activities, Stewart became known for her strong organizational skills, enthusiasm, and commitment to improving the lives of African Americans in her community. By 1921, she had founded several Evansville organizations: the Evansville Federation of Colored Women, the Day Nursery Association, the Phyllis Wheatley Home, and the Evansville Colored Association of College Women's Clubs, among others. Stewart's civic involvement was not limited to black women's organizations. In 1927, she served as an officer in the newly organized Evansville Inter-Racial Commission and the next year she chaired an auxiliary group of the tuberculosis association of Vanderburgh County, Indiana.

=== Indiana Federation of Colored Women ===
From 1921 to 1928 Stewart served as president of the Indiana Federation of Colored Women, a statewide organization established in 1904 and an affiliate of the National Association of Colored Women. Soon after becoming president of the IFCW, Stewart launched The Hoosier Woman, a monthly newsletter that she also edited. Its primary purpose as the official publication of the organization was to improve communication between the IFCW's leadership, local chapters, and individual members. By 1924, Stewart expanded the newsletter's scope to include national and international news.

During Stewart's tenure as president, the IFCW's membership increased from 42 clubs in 1921 to 89 clubs and a total of 1,670 members at the end of the decade. Stewart also streamlined the IFCW's organizational structure into five major departments with clubs assigned to the different departments based on their stated purposes. In addition, the IFCW began collecting dues of $2 per member, which funded the organization's scholarship program and its annual $50 scholarship prize. One goal that Stewart was not able to realize during her presidency was establishing ten Phyllis Wheatley Homes across Indiana. Six homes were established, but only three operated as boarding homes.

=== National Association of Colored Women ===
While continuing her civic and philanthropic work in Indiana, Stewart became involved in the National Association of Colored Women. In 1918, she was elected as chair of its social science division; in 1922, she was elected chair of the NACW's executive board and served in that capacity until 1924. Prior to her election as president of the NACW in 1928, she served for four years as its vice president and took an active role in fundraising for the organization, especially funding for the restoration and preservation of the Frederick Douglass home in Washington, D.C. In recognition of Stewart's efforts, the NACW made her a trustee and secretary of the Frederick Douglass Memorial and Historical Association.

In 1928, Stewart was unanimously elected president of the NACW, succeeding Mary McLeod Bethune. Stewart, the fourth president of the NACW, served until 1933, when Doctor Mary Fitzbutler Waring was elected as her successor. One of Stewart's accomplishments as president was the founding in 1930 of the National Association of Colored Girls, a youth affiliate of the NACW. She also traveled extensively to deliver lectures and visit clubs around the country. In 1930, Stewart obtained approval to realign the NACW's organizational structure after several previous unsuccessful attempts. Under her plan, the organization's 38 department were consolidated into two major areas. The first area focused on home and family; the second one on women in industry. The goal was to raise the standard of living for black women and their families across the country. Under Stewart's leadership, the NACW addressed its ongoing financial difficulties with the addition of a board of control to oversee its finances. Stewart also employed a full-time secretary for the NACW's national office in Washington, D.C.

=== Other activities ===
In addition to her years of service in the IFCW and NACW, Stewart was a member of several other social service organizations. In 1930, as the leader of the NACW, Stewart served as a delegate to the International Council of Women in Vienna, Austria. She also served as fourth vice president of the National Council of Women of the United States, becoming the first black woman to receive official recognition in the council. In 1942, Stewart organized the Colored Women's War Work Committee, which sold war bonds and stamps in the Evansville area during World War II.

Stewart also served as a member of the executive committee of the National Negro Business League; a member of the executive committee of the National Colored Merchants Association; a trustee of the Eastern Star and Masonic Home of Indiana; and president of Lincoln Alumni Association.

== Later years ==
Although the loss of a leg limited her mobility and she later used a wheelchair, Stewart continued to teach in the Evansville schools until her retirement in June 1951, a month before her death. She also remained active in philanthropic work.

== Death and legacy ==
Sallie Wyatt Stewart died at her home in Evansville, Indiana, in 1951.

Stewart is best known for her leadership in state and national women's organizations. Her legacy also included efforts to improve the lives of young blacks in Indiana. Stewart helped provide funds for their education through the IFCW's scholarship fund. She also established local social service organizations in Evansville such as the Day Nursery Association and the Phyllis Wheatley Home. At the time of Stewart's death in 1951, her estate was valued at over $100,000, which she left in trust to provide assistance to young black women.
