= Woman's Improvement Club (Indianapolis) =

The Woman's Improvement Club of Indianapolis, Indiana, was formed in 1903 by Lillian Thomas Fox, Beulah Wright Porter, and other prominent African American women as a small literary group to improve their education, but it was especially active and best known for its pioneering efforts to provide facilities to care for the city's African American tuberculosis patients from 1905 to the mid-1930s. The clubwomen also supported the war effort during World War I and provided social service assistance to Indianapolis's impoverished residents and its African American youth. By 1960, when tuberculosis was no longer a major health threat, the club continued its support of the local black community in other ways, such as a visiting nurse program and scholarships to students graduating from Crispus Attucks High School. In the mid-1960s, after its membership significantly declined, its records were donated to the Indiana Historical Society.

== Founding ==
In the tradition of many other black women's clubs in the early twentieth century, Lillian Thomas Fox, along with Beulah Wright Porter, and other prominent women of Indianapolis's African American community organized the Woman's Improvement Club in 1903 as a literary group at Fox's home. The club offered its members an opportunity for self improvement and personal growth.

== Membership ==
Fox, an African American journalist for the Indianapolis News and a local civic activist, was the primary leader and founder of the group. She also served as its president. Porter, a former teacher and Indianapolis physician, was a principal in the Indianapolis Public Schools. Her medical training was very beneficial to the club in its philanthropic work with tuberculosis patients.

Several of the club's early members were recognized as prominent members of Indianapolis's black community, such as Fox, Porter, Ada Harris, Ida Webb Bryan, Roxie Belle, and Cora Jackson, among others. A few of its first members were professional women, some were educators, and a few were married to professional men (businessmen, physicians, and clergymen). Other members were household servants, cooks, seamstresses, or other domestic workers. By 1920s the club's members were mainly teachers and social workers.

According to the club's constitution and bylaws, WIC membership was limited to twenty. The club's small size meant the close-knit group had to work closely together on projects. Membership in the exclusive club was passed from mother to daughter.

Early WIC members "believed firmly in middle-class values and the middle-class way of life." They were also active in other local literary clubs, religious groups, and black organizations that held gatherings in Indianapolis, such as the Knights of Pythias, Afro-American Council, and Anti-Lynching League. Their involvement with other civic groups, as well as the local black community's physicians, businessmen, and church leaders helped widen the clubwomen's contact base and obtain support for WIC projects. Club members also supported women's suffrage.

== Early activities ==
The clubwomen studied topics related to "racial pride and solidarity" and women's issues. They read the literature of African American writers, the poetry of Phyllis Wheatley, and learned about the lives of black missionaries, evangelists, inventors, and social and political leaders. The members also sponsored educational lectures to raise money for club projects. Prominent black speakers included Mary Church Terrell, the first president of the National Association of Colored Women's Clubs; W.E.B. Du Bois, the author of The Souls of Black Folk and magazine editor for the National Association for the Advancement of Colored People; and anti-lynching crusader Ida B. Wells.

In 1904, its second year of existence, the club expanded its scope beyond literary studies to include philanthropic work. Its members began by focusing on the care of African American tuberculosis patients in Indianapolis. At that time city hospitals were segregated and primarily served the white community. There were no facilities to care for black tuberculosis patients, even though the disease had a high mortality rate among African American living in urban areas.

=== Health care initiatives ===
By 1904 the WIC expanded its mission to include community service, with its major goal centering on improving health care for Indianapolis's black community. The club spearheaded efforts to combat tuberculosis and provide health care to African Americans afflicted with the disease.

The clubwomen began by raising funds to send small groups of the city's at-risk black children to the country to regain their strength. Suffering from poor health and inadequate nutrition, these children were deemed to be the most likely to be infected with tuberculosis. The club also established local nurses' training programs. In the early twentieth century nurses' training programs in Indianapolis hospitals were segregated, forcing African American students to leave the area to gain similar experience.

=== Oak Hill Camp ===
With no government-funded support, the club obtained permission from William Haueisin, a local white businessman, to established Oak Hill Camp on his property in 1905. The fresh-air camp for tuberculosis patients is believed to be the first of its kind in the United States.

Oak Hill Camp was modest in size. It included just three tents with board floors and a temporary frame building that had a partition down the middle to separate the camp kitchen from the living quarters of the camp's matron/cook/nurse. The facilities operated only during the summer months from 1905 to October 1916, treating six patients at a time. The volunteer-run camp was chronically short of cash, but the WIC continued to operate it though numerous fundraising activities at local churches, donations from the community, and personal contributions from WIC members until it permanently closed in 1916. Encroaching development in the area, lack of adequate funding, and changes in trends for treating tuberculosis patients are cited as the likely causes for its closure.

=== Other projects ===
After Oak Hill Camp closed in 1916, the clubwomen continued to raise funds care for the city's black tuberculosis patients and other projects. Between 1916 and 1918 the club raise funds by sponsoring numerous lectures to increase awareness and educate the community about tuberculosis and other community health concerns. Examples of the clubwomen's other projects include working with Mary Cable, principal of Indianapolis Public School Number 24, to open it as the city's first fresh-air school for African American students in 1916. The clubwomen also persuaded Van Camp Packing Company leaders to change its discriminatory practices and establish a division at its Indianapolis plant staffed with African-American women. In addition, the women hired WIC-member Daisy Brabham in 1918 as its first salaried visiting nurse/social worker.

Between 1910 and 1920, when health care facilities in Indianapolis were segregated and the city's black population was rapidly increasing, facilities in Indianapolis that provided care for black tuberculosis patients were limited. Sunnyside Sanitarium admitted only nineteen blacks in 1918. (The hospital opened in 1917 and was the only one in Marion County to provide care for tuberculosis patients.) Public funds were not allocated to assist black tuberculosis patients in the county until 1919. Despite challenges and setbacks, the WIC continued its efforts to provide tuberculosis care for blacks by becoming involved in year-round social work.

== Wartime support ==
In addition to its health care initiatives in Indiana, the all-black women's club supported the United States and its allies during World War I. The women raised funds for the War Chest Board and contributed to the National Colored Soldiers Relief Committee and Colored Soldiers Comfort Home. The club's fundraising efforts also assisted the orphans of black soldiers.

== Ongoing community service ==
After World War I, the WIC continued its crusade to provide health care for African Americans suffering from tuberculosis. After earlier efforts proved to be unsuccessful, the clubwomen finally got the Indianapolis Flower Mission Hospital to agree to open a room for black tuberculosis patients in 1918, and secured funding from the War Chest Board to help finance it. In 1919 the clubwomen successfully petitioned the Marion County commissioners to appropriate funds to care for black tuberculosis patients at Sunnyside; however, the hospital's reports did not show any increase in the allotment until 1926 and continued to allot beds to black on a pro-rata basis of one-tenth of the county's population. To help compensate for the continued shortage of hospital beds for black tuberculosis patients, the club began providing care at the former Sisters of Charity Hospital in 1922. It operated the facility for two years before purchasing a home on Agnes Street in 1924. The Agnes Street Cottage had space to care for six patients at a time; about thirty-five patients per year. In 1938, WIC members persuaded the Indianapolis Flower Mission to establish a segregated wing at City Hospital to care and treat black tuberculosis patients.

In addition to its assistance to tuberculosis patients, WIC expanded its social services in the 1920s. The clubwomen provided aid to indigent blacks facing eviction and food to the city's impoverished and underfed African American children. The women also sent some of these children to summer camps in the country.

== Later years ==
With the development of new medicines and treatments, tuberculosis was no longer a major health threat by 1960. Although the club discontinued tuberculosis-related work, it continued to support the local African American community in other ways. The clubwomen paid a visiting nurse to provide advice to black families and to help them get medical care and social services. The club also provided scholarships to students graduating from Crispus Attucks High School continue their education. By the mid-1960s, with membership significantly declining, the club's records were donated to the Indiana Historical Society.

== Legacy ==
While other community groups participated with the Woman's Improvement Club, it is the group considered to be the initiator and leader of the effort to provide tuberculosis facilities for black patients in Indianapolis. Between 1905 and 1935 the club provided health care to the city's African-American community, especially its tuberculosis patients, assisted its impoverished residents, and aided at-risk youth. While the club provided its members with opportunities for personal growth, educational improvement, and community service, it approached tuberculosis work in the "professional and scientific manner that prevailed during the Progressive Era."
