= Phyllis Wheatley YWCA (Indianapolis) =

United States historic place

- Founded: 1923
- Founder: May Belcher
- Founded at: Indianapolis, Indiana
- Dissolved: 1959
- Parent organization: YWCA

The Phyllis Wheatley YWCA was established in 1923 as a place to house and support Black women and girls in the Indianapolis community. It offered a swimming pool area, gymnasium, basement and program department areas. It became a staple in the Indiana Avenue neighborhood, providing education programs, music concerts, housing and community.

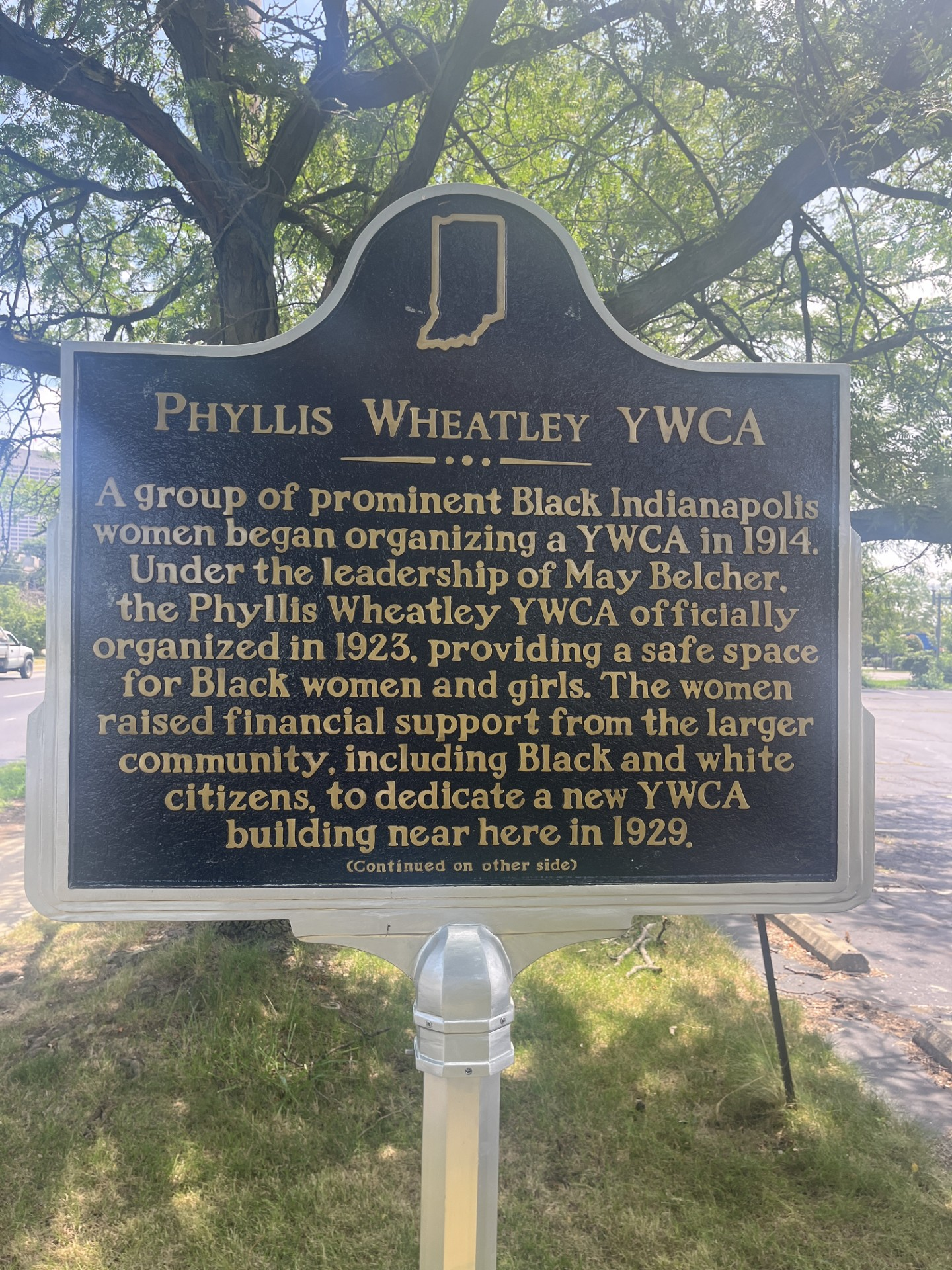

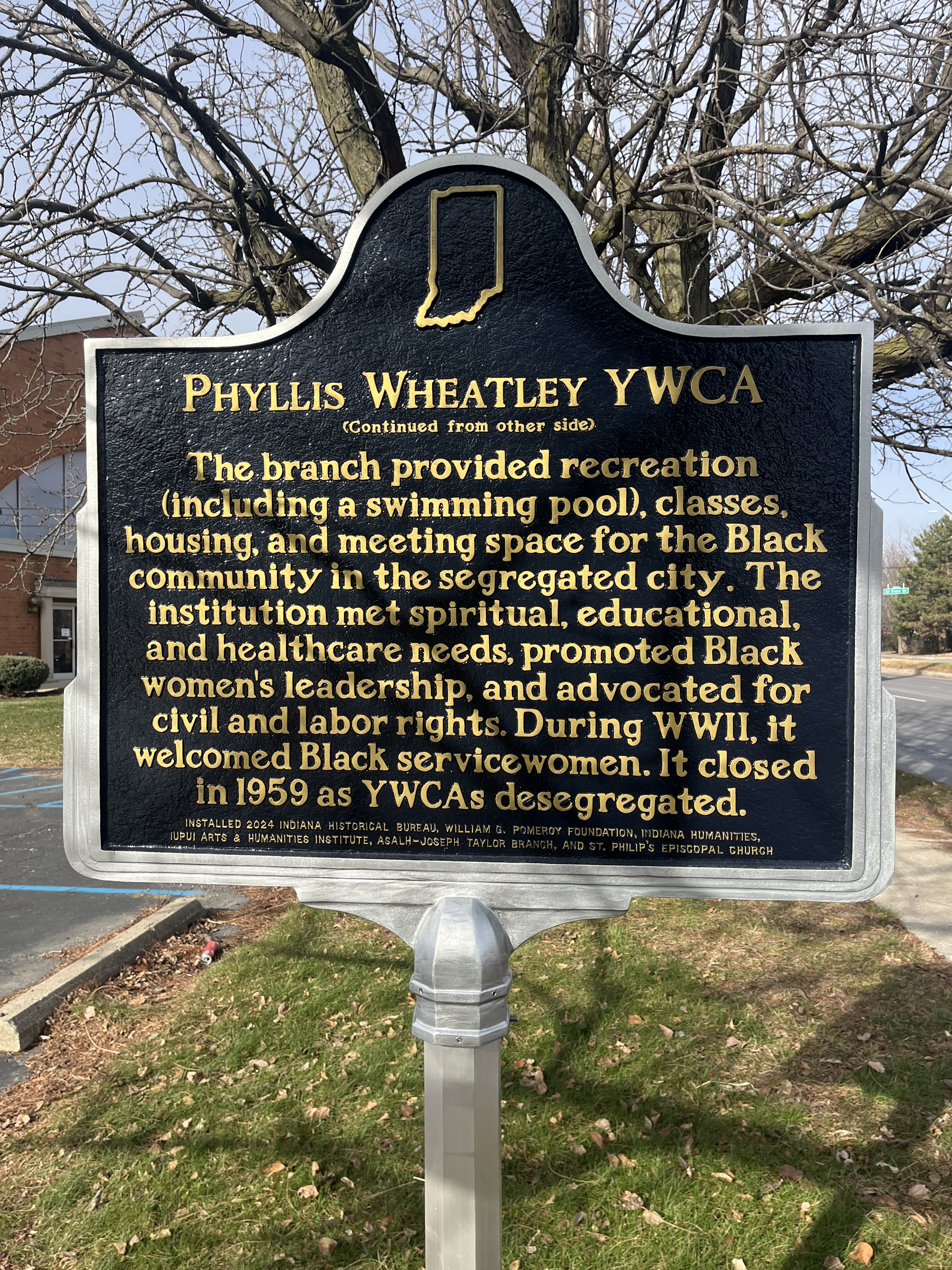
Phyllis Wheatley YWCA historical maker (continued).

== History ==
A group of young Black women met to discuss the establishment of a Young Women's Christian Association in Indianapolis in hopes for the organization to provide formative educational and cultural programming.

The initial Phyllis Wheatley YWCA was opened on California Street in 1921, and was named after the first published African American poet. May Belcher was the first executive director of the branch. They then moved to 601 North West Street, due to increased enrollment, there was a need for a bigger space.

In March 1927, a committee composed of five prominent Black women, among them Madame C. J. Walker, began to organize plans for a new YCWA that would support Black women and girls in Indianapolis. A campaign for $205,000 was approved by the board of directors of the community fund to support the building of a new YWCA.

In October 1927, a fire rapidly broke out on a Monday night and caused $200 in damage. All the residents were able to escape safely but many of their belongings were lost in the fire.

The ground was broken for the establishment of The Phyllis Wheatley YWCA in April 1928 and the cornerstone laying ceremony was held in October of the same year. The branch opened in 1929 at 653 North West Street in the midst of most YWCAs being segregated.

=== Cornerstone ===
In 1983, a ceremony was held to commemorate the Phyllis Wheatley YWCA after its demolition. At the ceremony, a timecapsule that had been placed in the cornerstone during the erection of the YW branch was opened. Mayor William Hudnut and former YWCA board member Murray Atkins Walls were in attendance. Walls was given the opportunity to place the items in the timecapsule 55 years prior because she was the youngest member of the YWCA Board at the time. The capsule included various newspaper articles and photographs which became preserved memorabilia at the Indianapolis YWCA.

=== Musical legacy ===
The Jordan Music Hall that was housed in the Phylis Wheatley YWCA, was an extension of the vibrant music culture of Indiana Avenue during the time of segregation. They hosted weekly concerts that highlighted Black classical musicians, many of which frequented the Indiana Avenue music scene, such as Felicia Weathers, Shirley Graham Du Bois, Sarah McLawler, Larry Ridley, David Hardiman and many more. Shirley Graham Du Bois led a Theatre program at the branch from 1940 to 1941.

=== Closing ===
The branch at 653 North West Street closed its doors in 1959 when the Central YWCA integrated. The building was subsequently sold to the Prince Hall Masons.

== Preservation efforts ==
A historical maker honoring the Phyllis Wheatley YWCA was placed in front of St. Philip's Episcopal Church. The plaque dedication ceremony was held in April 2025.

The marker reads:

“A group of prominent Black Indianapolis women began organizing a YWCA in 1914. Under the leadership of May Belcher, the Phyllis Wheatley YWCA officially organized in 1923, providing a safe space for Black women and girls. The women raised financial support from the larger community, including Black and white citizens, to dedicate a new YWCA building near here in 1929. The branch provided recreation (including a swimming pool), classes, housing, and meeting space for the Black community in the segregated city. The institution met spiritual, educational, and healthcare needs, promoted Black women’s leadership, and advocated for civil and labor rights. During WWII, it welcomed Black servicewomen. It closed in 1959 as YWCAs desegregated.“

A group of scholars and a community historian created a documentary highlighting the branch's history and it was projected during the ceremony of the plaque dedication.
