= List of Alabama suffragists =

This is a list of Alabama suffragists, suffrage groups and others associated with the cause of women's suffrage in Alabama.

== Groups ==
- Alabama Equal Suffrage Association (AESA), formed in 1912
- Alabama Woman Suffrage Organization (AWSO), created in 1893
- Coal City Equal Suffrage Association
- Equal Suffrage League of Birmingham, formed in 1911, later called the Equal Suffrage Association of Birmingham
- Huntsville Equal Suffrage Association, created in 1912
- Huntsville League for Woman Suffrage, formed in 1894
- National Junior Suffrage Corps
- Selma Suffrage Association, created on March 29, 1910
- Selma Suffragette Association
- Tuskegee Women's Club

== Suffragists ==
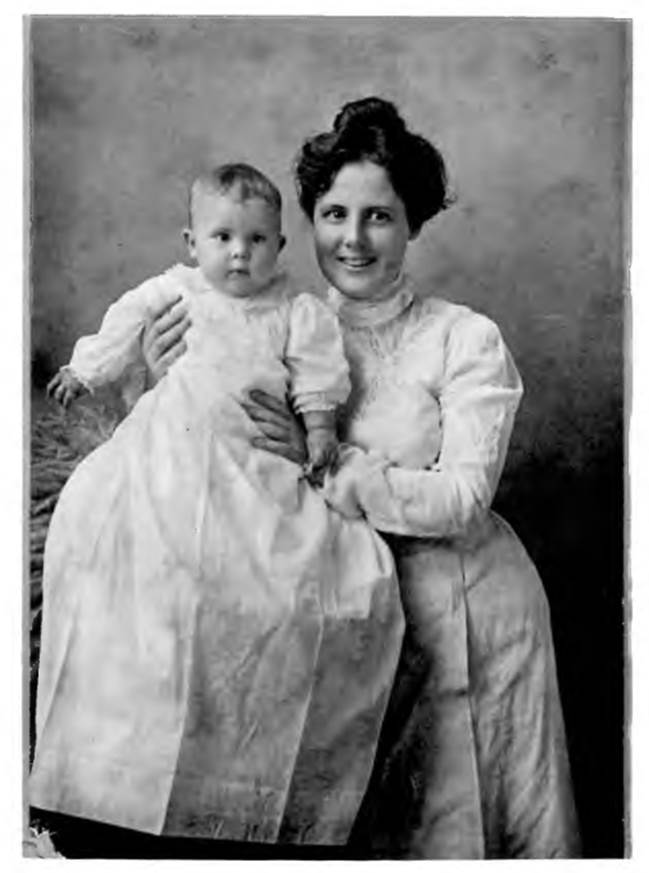
Alice Baldridge and her daughter

- Alice Baldridge (Huntsville)
- Lillian Roden Bowron (Birmingham)
- Virginia Tunstall Clay-Clopton
- James Drake (Huntsville)
- Priscilla Holmes Drake (Huntsville)
- Scottie McKenzie Frasier (Dothan)
- Emera Frances Griffin (Huntsville)
- Ellen Hildreth (Decatur)
- Frances John Hobbs (Selma)
- Ellelee Chapman Humes (Huntsville)
- Bossie O'Brien Hundley (Huntsville)
- Pattie Ruffner Jacobs
- Helen Keller (Tuscumbia)
- Indiana Little (Birmingham).
- Adella Hunt Logan (Tuskegee)
- Mary Parke London (Birmingham)
- Eugenie Marks (Mobile)
- Elizabeth "Bessie" Moore (Coal City)
- Mary Munson (Vinemont)
- Nellie Kimball Murdock (Birmingham)
- Carrie McCord Parke (Selma)
- Mary Partridge (Selma)
- Sally B. Powell (Montgomery)
- Mary Howard Raiford (Selma)
- Annie Buel Drake Robertson
- Pearl Still (Pell City)
- Alberta Chapman Taylor (Huntsville)
- Julia S. Tutwiler
- Margaret Murray Washington (Tuskegee)
- Mary Amelia John Watson (Selma)
- Hattie Hooker Wilkins (Selma)

=== Politicians supporting women's suffrage ===
- Benjamin Craig (Selma)
- Sam Will John

== Publications ==
- Alabama Suffrage Bulletin, published by the Alabama Equal Suffrage Association starting in October 1915
- The Progressive Woman, created in 1913 and edited by Frances Griffin and Juliet Cook Olin

== Suffragists who campaigned in Alabama ==
- Jane Addams.
- Susan B. Anthony.
- Belle Bennett.
- Julia Oates Randall Bonelli.
- Carrie Chapman Catt.
- Margaret Foley.
- Jean Gordon.
- Anna Howard Shaw

== Anti-suffragists ==
=== Groups ===
- Alabama Association Opposed to Woman Suffrage, created in 1916
- Alabama Woman's Anti-Ratification League (AWARL)
- Southern Women's Anti-ratification League

=== People ===
- John H. Bankhead
- Marie Bankhead Owen
- Oscar W. Underwood

== See also ==
- Timeline of women's suffrage in Alabama
- Women's suffrage in Alabama
- Women's suffrage in states of the United States
- Women's suffrage in the United States
