= Women's suffrage in Alabama =

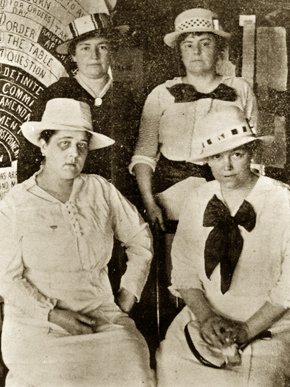
Four presidents of the Birmingham Equal Suffrage Association

Early women's suffrage work in Alabama started in the 1860s. Priscilla Holmes Drake was the driving force behind suffrage work until the 1890s. Several suffrage groups were formed, including a state suffrage group, the Alabama Woman Suffrage Organization (AWSO). The Alabama Constitution had a convention in 1901 and suffragists spoke and lobbied for women's rights provisions. However, the final constitution continued to exclude women. Women's suffrage efforts were mainly dormant until the 1910s when new suffrage groups were formed. Suffragists in Alabama worked to get a state amendment ratified and when this failed, got behind the push for a federal amendment. Alabama did not ratify the Nineteenth Amendment until 1953. For many years, both white women and African American women were disenfranchised by poll taxes. Blacks finally obtained their right to vote with the passage by Congress of the Voting Rights Act of 1965.

== Early efforts ==
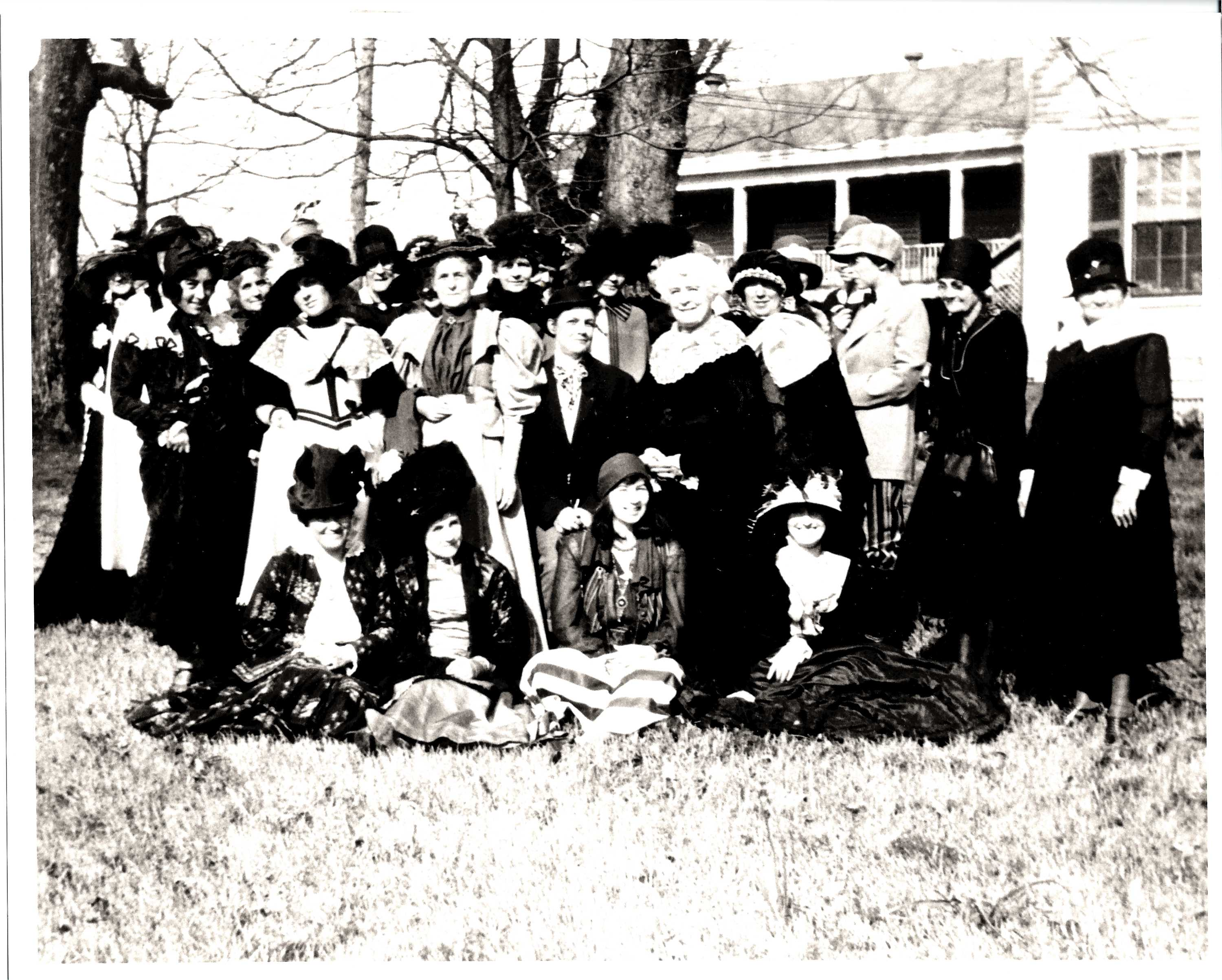
Huntsville League for Women's Suffrage, circa 1895

For many years, the women's suffrage movement in Alabama was represented only by Priscilla Holmes Drake and her husband, James Drake, who moved to Huntsville, Alabama in 1861. Priscilla Drake was the only Alabama representative to the National Woman Suffrage Association (NWSA) in the 1860s. Many women in Alabama during the late nineteenth century were involved in the temperance movement. Further early women's suffrage efforts in Alabama came out of women realizing they needed the vote to tackle social issues, like alcoholism, in the state.

Women's suffrage emerged again as an issue in the New Decatur Advertiser, where C. J. Hildreth began publishing women's suffrage articles in 1890. The first women's suffrage group in Alabama was created in New Decatur in 1892 and led by Ellen Stephens Hildreth. Also in 1892, another suffrage organization was formed in Verbena, Alabama. Emera Frances Griffin led the Verbena Suffrage Group. The next year, a statewide group, the Alabama Woman Suffrage Organization (AWSO) was founded by Hildreth and Griffin.

Frances John Hobbs and her sister, Mary Amelia John Watson, in Selma began to work on women's suffrage issues early in Alabama's suffrage movement. The sisters formed the Selma Suffragette Association. Hobbs' and Watson's work influenced other suffragists in Selma, including Carrie McCord Parke. The Huntsville League for Woman Suffrage was formed in 1894. Susan B. Anthony and Carrie Chapman Catt spoke to various Alabama women's suffrage groups in 1895. Anthony and Catt's presence in Huntsville helped increase the size of the new group. However, the next year, there was a financial depression in the state that slowed down suffrage work. Despite the depression, by 1897, the cities of Calera, Gadsden, and Jasper all had women's suffrage groups.

Griffin spoke at the Alabama state constitutional convention in 1901. Griffin spent a good deal of time in Montgomery, Alabama attempting to sway constitutional delegates on women's rights issues. She was considered an excellent speaker and had a "trademark wit". The convention considered several women's suffrage ordinances. Proponents of women's suffrage at the convention felt that giving women the vote would act as a "check on black suffrage". Despite Griffin's work, the Alabama Constitution was adopted without any concessions to women. After 1901, women's suffrage in Alabama went on hiatus for several years.

== Renewed efforts ==
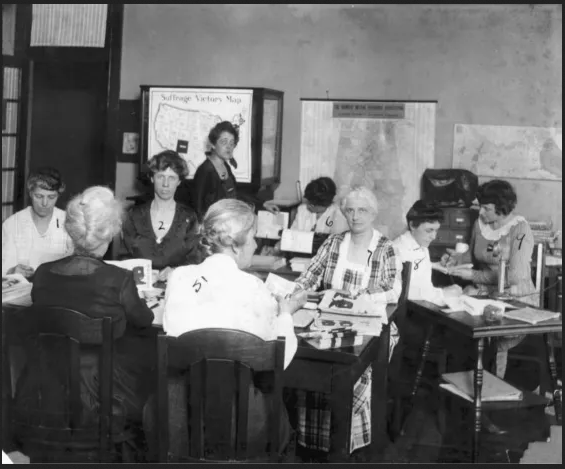
Suffragists in the Birmingham, Alabama suffrage headquarters

Women's suffrage efforts picked up in Alabama in the 1910s. Mary Partridge wrote to Anna Howard Shaw for advice and received encouragement to start a suffrage group in Selma. On March 29, 1910, Partridge and others created the Selma Suffrage League. In 1911, several women were inspired by the speeches given by Jane Addams and Louisiana suffragist, Jean Gordon, at the National Child Labor conference in Birmingham. Following the conference, Pattie Ruffner Jacobs and other women created the Birmingham Equal Suffrage League on October 22, 1911. These two groups had the strongest voices in the suffrage movement at the time. In 1912, Alabama suffragists decided to form a statewide group. On October 9, the Alabama Equal Suffrage Association (AESA) was created. AESA affiliated with the National American Woman Suffrage Association (NAWSA). Jacobs served as the first president and Partridge was elected vice-president. Headquarters were secured in Birmingham and the group began to advocate for women's suffrage and create resources. AESA had a traveling library of suffrage materials and the headquarters served as a place in the city for women to meet. The Huntsville Equal Suffrage Association was created in 1912 after Jacobs put out the call for more local organizing.

AESA held their first convention in Selma at the Hotel Albert in January 1913. AESA knew that Joseph Green, state representative of Dallas County, wanted to introduce a women's suffrage bill for the next legislative session in 1915. Women in Alabama hoped they could be the first Southern state to grant women's suffrage. The year 1914 saw an increase in the number of women's suffrage groups in Alabama with representatives from around the state attending the second state suffrage convention in Huntsville on February 5. In 1914 Bossie O'Brien Hundley began work as the AESA legislative committee chair to lobby the state legislature for women's suffrage.

During the 1915 legislative session in January, a bill for a women's suffrage amendment was introduced and sent into Committee where it sat until July. Suffragists lobbied committee members to vote the bill out of committee and hold a hearing. Green and Senator Sam Will John had the bill brought to the floor for a vote on August 25. Two days before the vote, "Alabama Democrats on Behalf and in Defense of the Large Unorganized Majority of the Women in Alabama" published an anti-suffrage pamphlet that was distributed to all of the legislators. Green went back on his own support of the bill he introduced. The suffrage bill eventually did not receive the necessary three-fifths vote to pass.

The 1917 state suffrage convention was held from February 12 to 13. Around 81 women's suffrage clubs were reported at the conference. After the convention, a suffrage school was conducted by members of the National American Woman Suffrage Association (NAWSA) with 200 Alabama women attending. In 1917, when the United States entered World War I, AESA, like many suffrage groups, began to aid the war effort.

== Ratification efforts ==
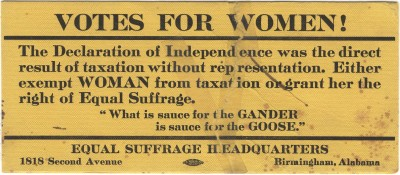
"Votes for Women" from the Alabama Equal Suffrage Association, 1919

Suffragists in Alabama began to feel that their best chance of getting the vote was to support a federal suffrage amendment. In 1917, Pattie Ruffner Jacobs publicly supported a federal amendment for women's suffrage. At the 1918 state convention in Selma, AESA formally endorsed the federal amendment route to women's suffrage. Suffragists in the AESA started on a campaign to support the ratification of the Nineteenth Amendment in June 1919. AESA set up a Ratification Committee and secured volunteers to organize, campaign and lobby. AESA also had help from NAWSA in the form of suffrage literature and organizers sent to the state.

The state legislature considered the Nineteenth Amendment in July 1919. Suffragists from around Alabama traveled to Montgomery to lobby for women's suffrage. The Women's Anti-Ratification League, with Marie Bankhead Owen as a leader, led a strong opposition to ratifying the amendment. Senators Oscar W. Underwood and John H. Bankhead were also opposed to the amendment and added their voices to the anti-suffragists. On July 17, the state senate rejected the amendment and in August, the state house also voted no.

At the last state suffrage convention in April 1920, the AESA was dissolved and the League of Women Voters (LWV) of Alabama was formed. After the Nineteenth Amendment was ratified, Suffragists in Alabama held a victory parade in Birmingham. Women from around Jefferson County, no matter how they had felt about women's suffrage were invited to march on September 4. Around 1,500 suffragists participated, marching with 36 cars and a band..

== Suffrage efforts continued ==
Even after women in Alabama won the right to vote following the ratification of the Nineteenth Amendment, many poor white women did not vote because of Alabama's poll tax. Low voter turnout among white women voters in Alabama was blamed by political researchers on a general "disinterest" in politics among that demographic. More serious was the poll tax--you only had to pay it if you wanted to vote. This came to the attention of the Democratic National Committee's Women's Division which was led by Mary Dewson and Eleanor Roosevelt. The Women's Division started to recruit local women to fight the poll tax. On October 26, 1938, May Thompson Evans, assistant director of the Women's Division, spoke to Alabama women Democrats and urged them to fight the poll tax. Evans argued that women were being disenfranchised, but also implied that white supremacy in Alabama was threatened if white women could not vote. Women involved in professional organizations in Alabama worked to change local laws regarding the poll tax during the 1930s.

Virginia Durr and the Women's Division collected more information on the poll tax. Durr also helped start the National Committee to Abolish the Poll Tax (NCAPT). Another study, published in 1942 by Eleanor Bontecou, showed that white women faced "disproportionate disenfranchisement" because of the poll tax. Attempts to pass federal legislation banning poll taxes failed between 1942 and 1949. On a local level, white Alabama women continued to fight the poll tax and lobby legislators. A bill passed in 1944 exempting service-members and Veterans from the poll tax helped show that the tax affected women more than men. By the late 1940s, white women in Alabama realized they had to face the issue of racial discrimination and the poll tax.

In 1953, a bill to reduce the back tax accumulation period was passed in the state legislature and approved by the voters. This allowed a huge increase in the number of white women who were able to register to vote. The fight over the poll tax continued into the 1960s. Finally, the ratification of the Twenty-Fourth Amendment in 1964 ended the poll tax in Alabama.

== African-American women and suffrage ==
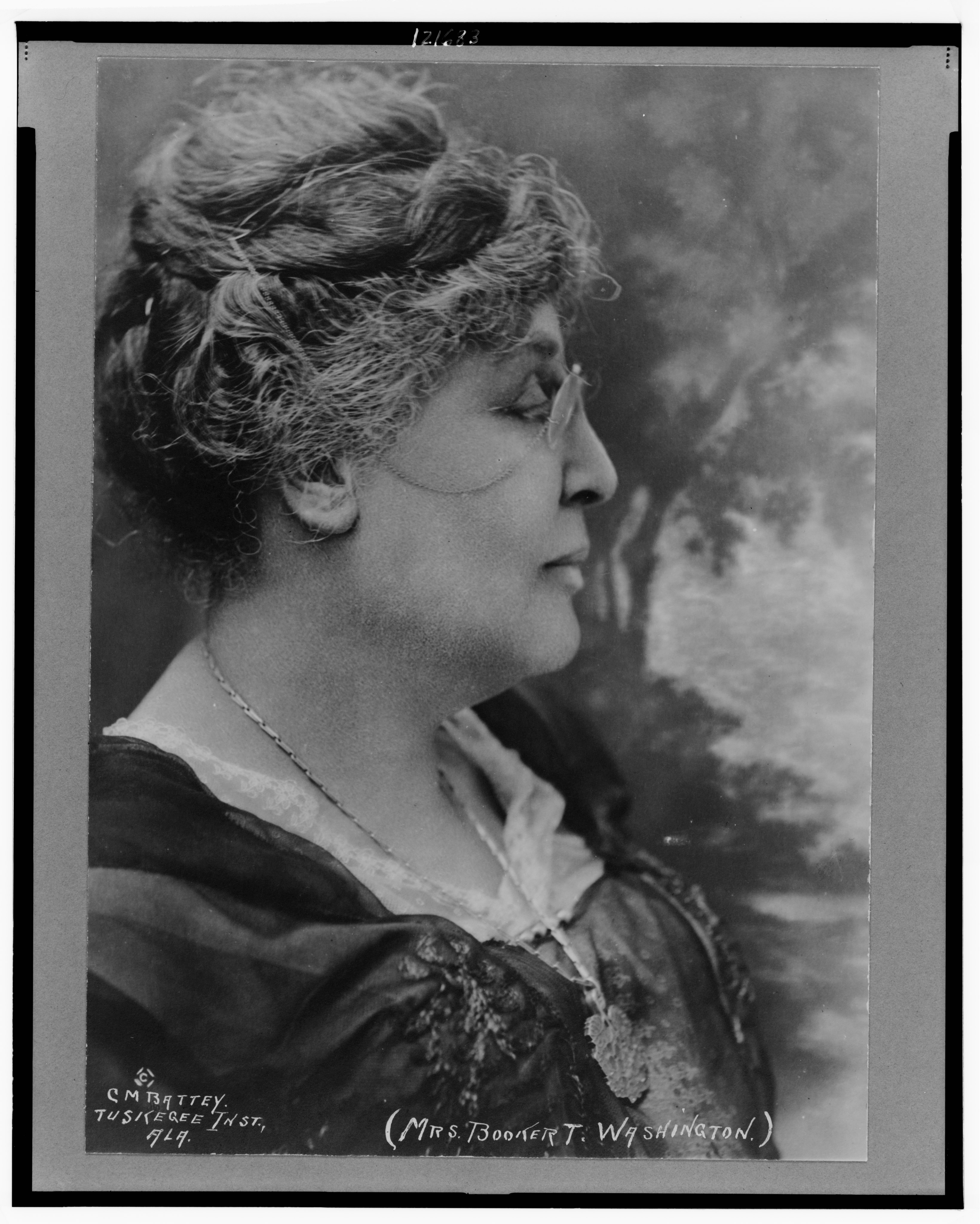
Margaret Murray Washington

White suffragists in Alabama argued that enfranchising women would not extend to African-American women. Instead, they argued that white women's votes would "cancel out" the votes of Black men.

Much of the African-American suffrage work was done through Black women's clubs. In 1910, the Alabama Federation of Colored Women's Clubs (AFCWC) endorsed women's suffrage. In Tuskegee, Alabama, Black suffragists worked on a variety of issues to improve the lives of people in their community. Margaret Murray Washington led the Tuskegee Women's Club which was affiliated with the Tuskegee Institute. The club was able to provide educational opportunities that were otherwise out of reach to many African-Americans. Adella Hunt Logan, who was able to pass for white, was able to attend suffrage conventions throughout Alabama. Logan also worked as the head of the National Association of Colored Women's Clubs' (NACWC) suffrage department. Logan was also the only life member of the National American Woman Suffrage Association (NAWSA) from Alabama. Logan was a prolific writer on the topic of women's suffrage and owned a huge library of suffrage materials.

After the passage of the Nineteenth Amendment, Black women still faced challenges voting. Voters had to fill out a four-page application form, swear an oath, pass a literacy test and pay a poll tax. In protest of the intelligence tests given to Black people and not white people, Indiana Little led a march of around 1000 Black men and women to Birmingham's voting registrar's office, resulting in her arrest. Some counties in Alabama had a "voucher system" where another registered voter had to support or "vouch for" other voters to register. Black voters also knew that their public registration meant that the KKK also knew they had registered to vote. The process was meant to intimidate Black voters. Black women also faced segregation. The Montgomery League of Women Voters (LWV) refused to integrate in the 1940. In response, Black leaders created the Women's Political Council (WPC).

The Twenty-fourth Amendment abolished poll taxes across the United States. It was fully ratified on January 23, 1964. The passage of the Voting Rights Act of 1965 provided African-American women increased access to the right to vote. By 1967, the number of registered Black voters increased significantly.

== Anti-suffragists ==
Many men believed it would be degrading for women to vote or become involved in politics Women's suffrage was also seen as a "radical" idea by women in the South.

When the Nineteenth Amendment went out to the states for ratification, Alabama anti-suffragists mobilized. In 1919, the Alabama Woman's Anti-Ratification League (AWARL) was formed. AWARL argued that allowing women to vote would undermine the Alabama Constitution. They were also worried that women's suffrage would undermine white supremacy in Alabama.

== See also ==
- List of Alabama suffragists
- Timeline of women's suffrage in Alabama
- Women's suffrage in states of the United States
- Women's suffrage in the United States
- Women's poll tax repeal movement
