= James P. Drake =

American military officer and politician (1797–1876)

James Perry Drake
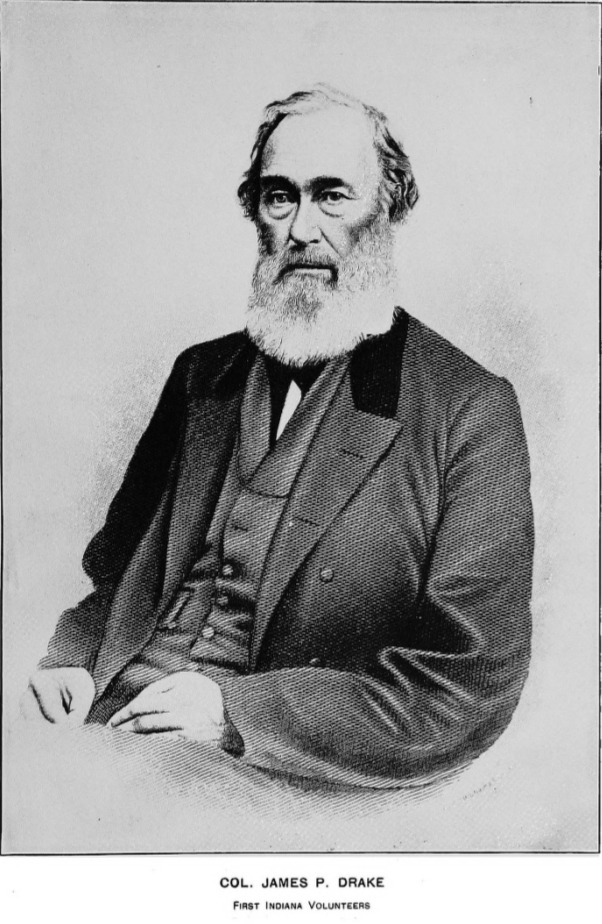
- James P. Drake c.1860s

Indiana State Treasurer
- In office February 9, 1850 – February 9, 1853
- Preceded by: Samuel Hannah
- Succeeded by: Elijah Newland

Member of the Indiana General Assembly
- In office 1848–1849

Personal details
- Born: September 15, 1797 Robeson County, North Carolina
- Died: August 12, 1876 (aged 78) Huntsville, Alabama
- Resting place: Maple Hill Cemetery
- Other political affiliations: Democratic
- Spouse: Priscilla Holmes Drake
- Relations: Don Carlos Buell (nephew); George P. Buell (in-law); William T. H. Brooks (son-in-law)
- Children: 5
- Occupation: Politician; Treasurer; Farmer

Military service
- Years of service: June 1846 – June 1847
- Rank: Brigadier General (State Militia); Colonel (Mexican-American War)
- Unit: Indiana Militia; 1st Indiana Volunteers
- Commands: Company H, 1st Indiana Volunteers
- Battles/wars: Blackhawk War; Mexican-American War

James Perry Drake (September 15, 1797 – August 17, 1876) was an American lawyer, military officer, politician, and public official from Indiana. He was one of the founders of Lebanon, Indiana, alongside George L. Kinnard. Drake was the husband of American suffragist Priscilla Holmes Drake, the uncle of Union Army General Don Carlos Buell, and the father-in-law of Union General William T. H. Brooks.

== Early life ==
James Perry Drake was born on September 15, 1797, in Robeson County, North Carolina; his parents were Albritton B. Drake (1755–1835), a veteran of the American Revolutionary War, and Ruth Ann Collins (1765–1847). The Drakes had a total of seven children. Drake's father Albritton had served in the Nash County Company of Light Horse, a light cavalry unit under the command of Patriot General Nathanael Greene. Following the American Revolution, Drake's family moved to Mason County, Kentucky, where Albritton was granted a land claim. Drake's family were ardent Methodists, Drake's father eventually became heavily involved with Methodist circuit riders and the Methodist Church of Kentucky. Drake eventually moved northward and settled in the state of Indiana by 1819.

== Political career ==
Drake was appointed as the County Clerk and auditor of Posey County, Indiana, from 1819 to 1829. During his time as County Clerk Drake was responsible for collecting $1,087.50 to be appropriated for plots of land in Springfield, Posey County, Indiana. On April 30, 1830, Drake and surveyor George L. Kinnard founded the city of Lebanon, Indiana, in central Boone County. Drake and Kinnard were land speculators for the county and eventually developed Lebanon into the county seat. According to the Vincennes-based newspaper, the Western Sun & General Advertiser, in 1834 Drake was appointed as the Receiver of Public Moneys for the United States General Land Office in Indianapolis by President of the United States Andrew Jackson.

Drake was a member of the Indiana General Assembly from 1848 to 1849 and was appointed as the Indiana State Treasurer from February 9, 1850, until February 9, 1853. Later in his career Drake was the director of the Indiana state bank, a trustee of the institution for people with disabilities, and the state superintendent of common schools.

== Military service ==
Drake served in the Posey County militia while living in New Harmony, Indiana, during the Black Hawk War in 1832. All men of Posey County at the time were required to serve in the county-level militia. While in the state militia Drake held the rank of Brigadier General of the 12th Indiana Militia Brigade.

At the outbreak of the Mexican–American War, Drake volunteered to raise a company of Indiana volunteers from Marion County, which he nicknamed the "Marion Volunteers". According to Oran D. Perry's book Indiana in the Mexican War, Drake's company was completely mustered in by June 19, 1846. Drake's company of volunteers would form the backbone of Company H of the 1st Indiana Volunteer Infantry Regiment. Drake would eventually rise to the rank of Colonel of the regiment while serving in Mexico. Following the war Drake became an influential member of the Aztec Club of 1847 in Indiana.

== Later life and death ==
By 1860 Drake had retired from a life of politics and public office and lived in Decatur, Indiana, where he worked as a farmer. Following the American Civil War, Drake moved his family to Huntsville, Alabama, where he continued to own property as a farmer. Drake died on August 17, 1876, and is buried in the Maple Hill Cemetery in Huntsville.

== Personal life ==
Drake was married to Priscilla Holmes Drake, a prominent American suffragist on January 23, 1831, in Lawrenceburg, Indiana. Together the Drakes had seven children. Upon the death of Priscilla's brother Salmon D. Buell in 1828, James and Priscilla raised and educated their nephew, Don Carlos Buell, who would later become a prominent figure during the American Civil War. One of Drake's daughters, Alma Buell Drake, married Seminole Wars veteran and Union Army General William Thomas Harbaugh Brooks who commanded the First Division of the VI Corps.
