= Lincoln–Johnson ledger-removal allegation =

Alleged 1869 Andrew Johnson crime

The Lincoln–Johnson ledger-removal allegation refers to a 19th-century news story asserting that 17th U.S. President Andrew Johnson had illegally removed documents from the White House that rightfully belonged to the American people as part of the historical record of the United States federal government.

As the 16th U.S. Vice President Andrew Johnson of Tennessee had succeeded to the Presidency following the assassination of Abraham Lincoln but Johnson failed to obtain a nomination for the 1868 election from either major national political party, and in due course Ulysses S. Grant was elected President of the United States. Johnson and Grant disliked one another. Johnson's term in office as the 17th U.S. president ended, and Grant's term began, on March 4, 1869.

In any case, within the first month after Johnson left office, a news story appeared in the Cincinnati Times newspaper that accused him of, at least, mishandling of government documents and at worst, outright theft. The story was picked up and republished in a dozen other, mostly Northern and Western, presumably Republican-aligned, newspapers, during April and May. (Note: Per Newspapers.com search results, the story appears in identical form in the Sacramento Bee, Chicago Tribune, Weekly Marysville Tribune (Ohio), Steuben Republican (Angola, Indiana), Monongahela Valley Republican (Pennsylvania), Perrysburg Journal (Ohio), Dodgeville Chronicle (Wisconsin), Nebraska Advertiser, Owyhee Semi-Weekly Tidal Wave (Silver City, Idaho), Belvidere Standard (Illinois), Freeport Journal (Illinois), Osage County Chronicle (Kansas), Indiana Herald, Montana Post, et al., and in abridged form elsewhere.)

Serious Accusation against Andrew Johnson ¶ The Washington correspondent of the Cincinnati Times makes the following accusation against Andrew Johnson: ¶ "The late President always boasted of his integrity and his honesty and his farewell address pompously proclaimed that no one could charge him with corruption or with having received a cent which did not rightfully belong to him. It has been discovered since he left the White House that he carried away with him all the books of record belonging to the Government amounting in value to upward of $3,000. These books were mostly heavily bound costing from $30 to $90 each and were paid for with the public money and he had no more right to take them than he would have to carry off the furniture, paintings, and statuary from the White House. These books comprise all the records of civil, military, and diplomatic business which transpired during his term and that of Lincoln. ¶ Before Lincoln came into office no such records were kept at the White House by former Presidents. Lincoln commenced the practice and at his death all the records remained at the White House and came into possession of his successor. The clerks who kept these books were attached to the Treasury Department and detailed for duty at the White House. It is probable that Congress will order an investigation and, if it can be done, compel the retiring President to disgorge. A person connected with the White House knowing the books were being boxed up to be removed endeavored to have them stopped and applied to a magistrate for a warrant but, as he had no title in the property, and it was scarcely believed that Johnson intended to carry off the public property, nothing was done to prevent it."

It is unclear if the "books of record" existed, if they were improperly removed, or, if they existed and were improperly removed, whether or not they were ever recovered.

== See also ==
- Buell Commission missing-documents investigation
- Impeachment of Andrew Johnson
- 1868 impeachment managers investigation
- Federal prosecution of Donald Trump
