= Buell Military Commission =

1862–63 U.S. government investigation

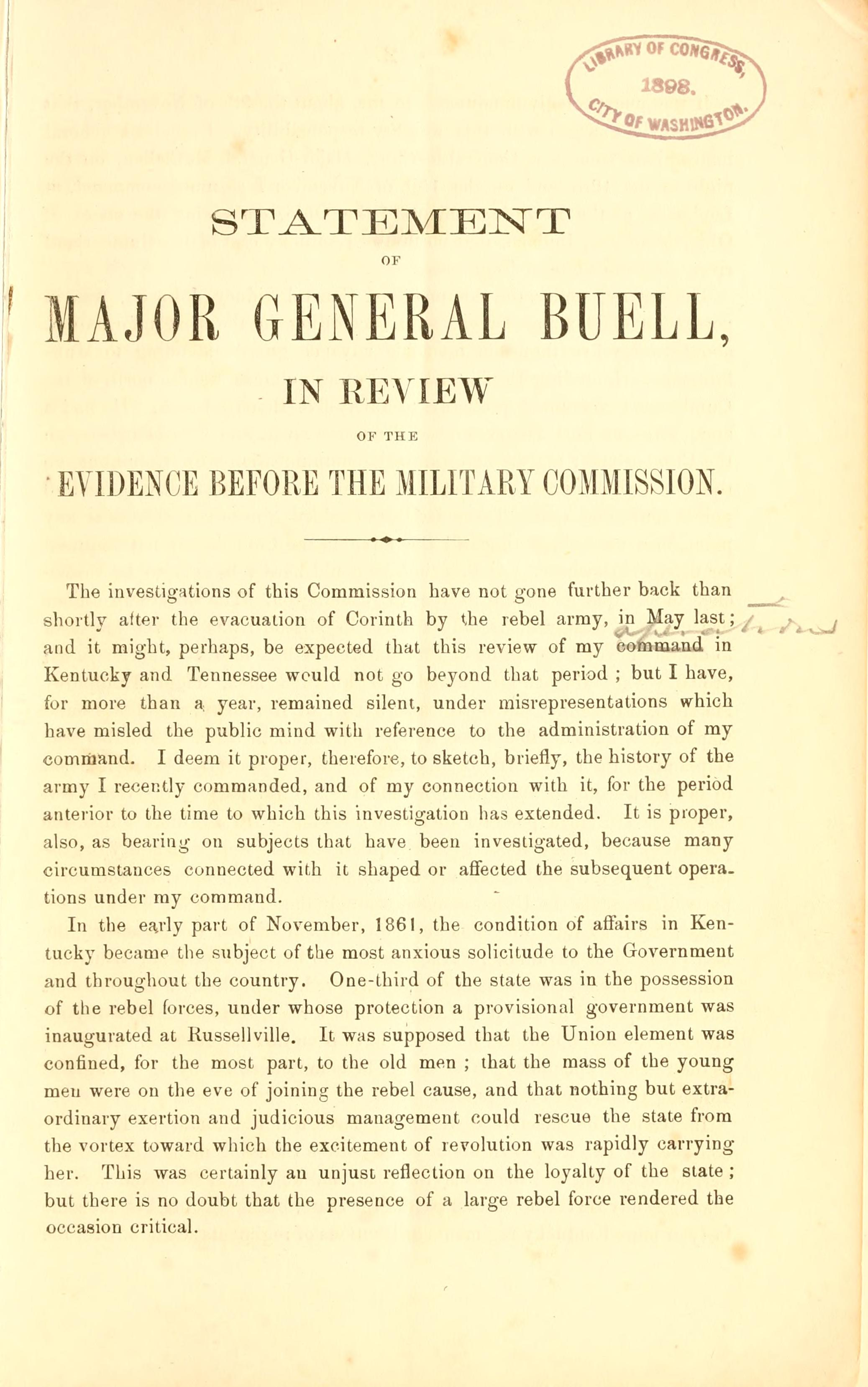
"Statement of Major General Buell, in review of the evidence before the military commission" (1863, retrieved from the Library of Congress)

The Buell Military Commission was an 1862–63 U.S. government investigation into the command decisions of U.S. Army general Don Buell in the first years of the American Civil War. The commission was headed by Lew Wallace. The investigation was largely the consequence of the conflict over decision-making in Tennessee between military governor Andrew Johnson and Buell, commander of military forces in the state. According to historian Peter Maslowski, "The Lincoln administration made a serious error when it failed to provide Johnson and Buell with explicit instructions on their respective responsibilities."

== Commission ==
Buell was ultimately absolved of charges that he failed to conduct an effective offensive campaign in the upper South–lower Midwest region because he was negligent or held secret Confederate allegiances. Scholar Mark Peine describes the commission as a "form of mock trial, used by the Government against an unpopular military commander for political intent." The commission functioned primarily behind closed doors, and a separate but related controversy that followed was the mysterious disappearance of the official record of the Buell Commission.

Later on, Buell and Tennessee military governor Andrew Johnson were involved in a dispute over the history of the military action in the region. As retold in the Whig, "All remember that Johnson asserted that Buell argued with him the absolute necessity of evacuating Nashville when Bragg invaded Kentucky, and that Buell would have done but for his (Johnson's) positive refusal to give up the capital. ¶ While at the dinner table of the Burnett House, in Cincinnati, General Buell told Andrew Johnson, in the presence of a number of person, that he (Johnson) had lied, and he knew it."

== Missing records ==
The Buell Commission missing-documents investigation was a Congressional inquiry into what were said to be the only significant documents relating to the Civil War submitted to the custody of the War Department with unknown whereabouts. The newspapers printed theories that Andrew Johnson had had the records disappeared for the benefit of his own reputation and presidential re-election chances, because as military governor of Tennessee he blamed Buell for not liberating his home region of East Tennessee from Confederate depredation. Johnson had frequently and loudly condemned Buell as a derelict and a coward, and they had a resulting personal enmity. (According to one soldier's letter to his wife, Buell and Johnson got into what amounted to a slap fight in 1862.) For his part, Buell firmly (and fairly convincingly) refuted the charges against himself, although contemporary scholars argue that he was almost impossibly sluggish in his troop movements and note that he was unaware of the Battle of Perryville until combat had been ongoing for hours.

Military Governor Andrew Johnson refused to ever testify in front of the Buell Commission despite his public trash talk. Ex-President Andrew Johnson was, however, summoned to Congress to testify in the matter of the missing record in 1872. The House Committee on Military Affairs' Buell Court of Inquiry also investigated if General Sherman might have had an interest in removing the documents.

Ultimately the lost record was recovered in the form of the court clerk's personal copy. The diligent hero who recovered the documents was, as it happens, Benn Pitman, also the clerk at the trial of the Abraham Lincoln assassination conspirators. Buell himself also had a transcript in his possession that he was willing to share.

The Committee secondarily examined why certain letters and documents from chief of staff Henry Halleck's records had vanished.

== See also ==
- East Tennessee bridge-burning conspiracy & East Tennessee Convention
- Lincoln–Johnson ledger-removal allegation
