= 1st Indiana Volunteers =

Infantry regiment

1st Indiana Volunteers 1st Indiana Volunteer Infantry Regiment
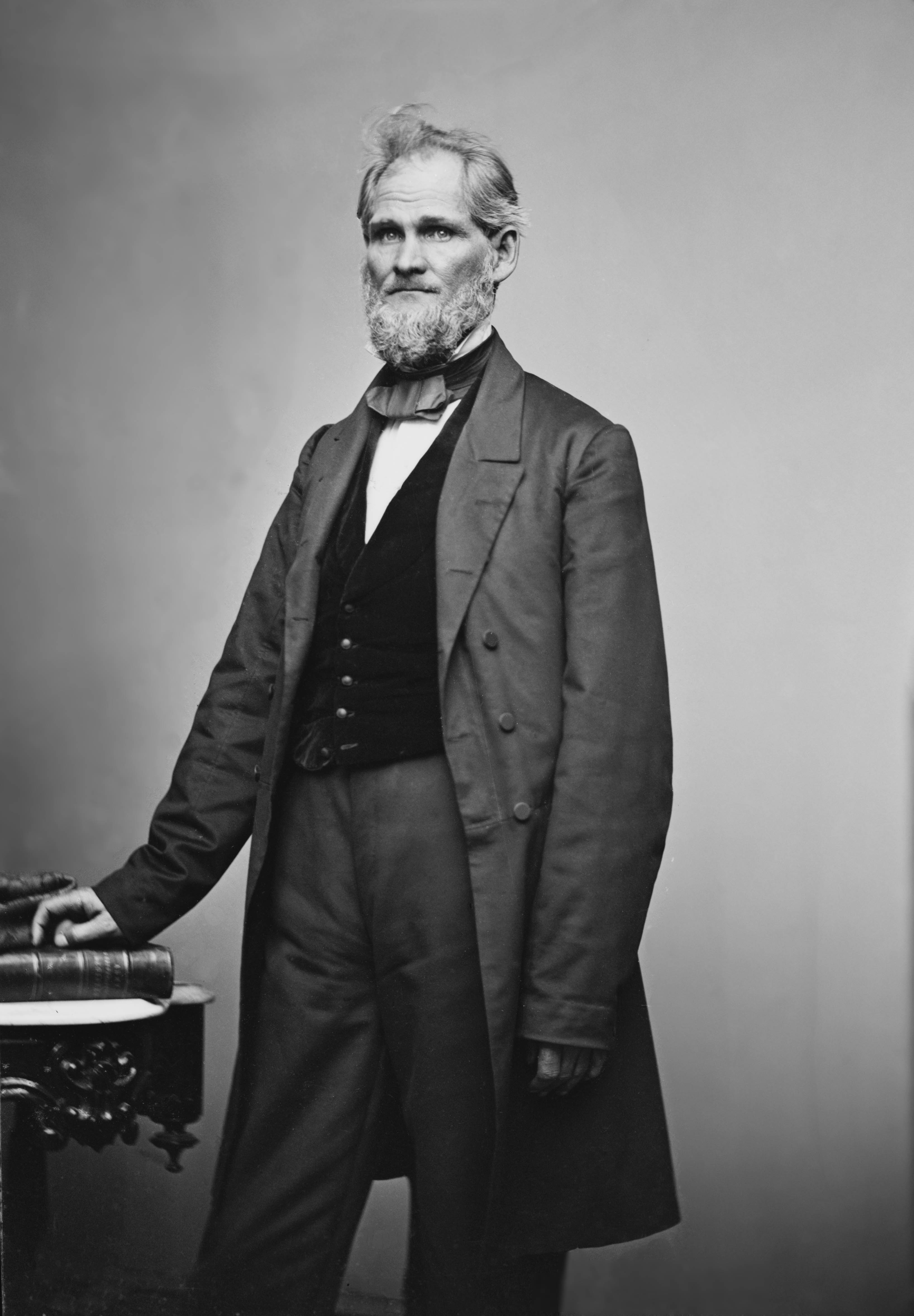
- Lieutenant Colonel Henry Smith Lane c.1855–1865
- Active: 1846–1847
- Country: United States
- Allegiance: Indiana
- Branch: United States Volunteers
- Type: Infantry
- Size: 856
- Engagements: Mexican-American War

Commanders
- Colonel: James P. Drake
- Notable commanders: Henry Smith Lane; Lew Wallace

The 1st Indiana Volunteers, or the 1st Infantry Regiment, Indiana Volunteers, was a regiment of soldiers primarily from southern Indiana commanded by Colonel James Perry Drake and Lieutenant Colonel and future Governor of Indiana and United States Senator Henry S. Lane, during the Mexican–American War. It was the first regiment to be created by the state. Its arms were purchased using a loan from the Bank of Indiana, and was dispatched to Mexico in 1846. The regiment was primarily on patrol duty during its tour, guarding supply lines and manning outposts. After returning from the war, many of the men in the unit reenlisted in the 5th Indiana Volunteers.

== Organization ==
The regiment was organized from June 1 to June 12, 1846, the regiment was formally mustered into Federal service from June 20 to the 23 in New Albany, Indiana. According to the book The Mexican War: a History of its Origin, and a Detailed Account of the Victories by Edward Deering Mansfield the regiment recruited a total of 856 men for service in the war. James Perry Drake of Indianapolis was elected as the Colonel of the regiment with Christian Carriger Nave of Danville elected as the Lieutenant Colonel and Henry S. Lane of Crawfordsville elected as Major. The regiment was organized as follows in the spring and summer of 1846:

Company	Earliest Moniker	Primary Place of Recruitment	Earliest Captain
A	Putnam Blues	Putnam County	J.H. Roberts
B	Wabash Rangers	Miami County	John W. Wilson
C	Wabash Invincibles	Carroll County	Robert H. Milroy
D	Fountain Volunteers	Fountain County	Robert M. Evans
E	Mad AnthonyGuards	Allen County	John W. McLane
F	Wayne Guards	Allen County	David W. Lewis
G	Cass County Volunteers	Cass County	Spear (Spier) Spencer Tipton
H	Marion Volunteers	Marion County	James P. Drake
I	Hendricks County Volunteers	Hendricks County	Christian Carriger Nave
K	Montgomery Volunteers	Montgomery County	Henry S. Lane

== Service ==
On July 5, 1846, the regiment left the state for New Orleans aboard the steamboats Cincinnati and the Grace Darling arriving on Saturday July 11, the regiment then moved to Mexico on July 17. The regiment landed at Brazos Island on July 30 and proceeded 15–20 miles south to the Rio Grande. For much of its early time in Mexico the regiment was garrisoned at Matamoros. On December 4, 1846, Lieutenant Colonel Christian Carriger Nave resigned his commission and Major Henry S. Lane was appointed as Lieutenant Colonel. On December 5 the regiment was ordered to move to Camargo which after the arrival of General Joseph Lane. On December 9 the regiment boarded the steamboats J. E. Roberts and the Rough and Ready bound for Camargo down the Rio Grande. The J. E. Roberts arrived at Camargo on December 14 while the Rough and Ready arrived on the 15th. On December 19 the whole of the regiment marched on its way to Monterrey. The regiment stopped in Mier on December 20 where it encamped for the evening. On the 22nd the regiment continued its march and stopped in Pontaguida before continuing to Cerralvo on the 23rd. That same day, the regiment was intercepted by an express mail courier and was ordered back to the mouth of the Rio Grande where it again encamped at Matamoros near Pagans Creek on Christmas Eve. On December 26 the regiment marched to Monterey and then to Santa Catarina where it encamped. The next day the regiment was encamped at La Rinconada, a narrow mountain pass, having travelled 24 miles and remained in the region for much of the spring of 1847.

The regiment was eventually sent back to New Orleans in May 1847 having seen zero battles or skirmishes. The regiment was mustered out of service in June 1847. As veterans of the regiment returned to their respective homes many counties held barbecue picnics to welcome home the 1st Indiana Volunteers.

== Notable people ==
- Henry S. Lane: Was the Colonel of the regiment during the entirety of the regiments service in Mexico. From 1840 to 1850 Lane served as a Member of the U. S. House of Representatives from Indiana's 7th district. Lane later served in the Indiana Senate from 1861 to 1867 and would eventually be elected as the 13th Governor of Indiana.
- Robert Huston Milroy: Milroy served as the Captain of Company C from June 20, 1846, until June 16, 1847. Milroy would later fight in the American Civil War and commanded the 9th Indiana Infantry Regiment.
- Lew Wallace: Served as a 1st Lieutenant and later as the regiments adjutant. Wallace would go on to become a Major General during the American Civil War and serve as the 11th Governor of New Mexico Territory.
- Spencer Spear Tipton: Originally from Sevier County, Tennessee, Tipton served as the Captain of Company G of the "Cass County Volunteers". Tipton was the son of John Tipton, an Indiana politician and military officer who fought in the 1811 Battle of Tippecanoe, and was a veteran officer of the War of 1812.
- Elias W.H. Beck: Served as the Regimental Surgeon during the regiments time in Mexico. Beck later served in the 3rd Indiana Cavalry Regiment during the American Civil War.
