= Don Carlos Buell =

American Union Army General (1818–1898)

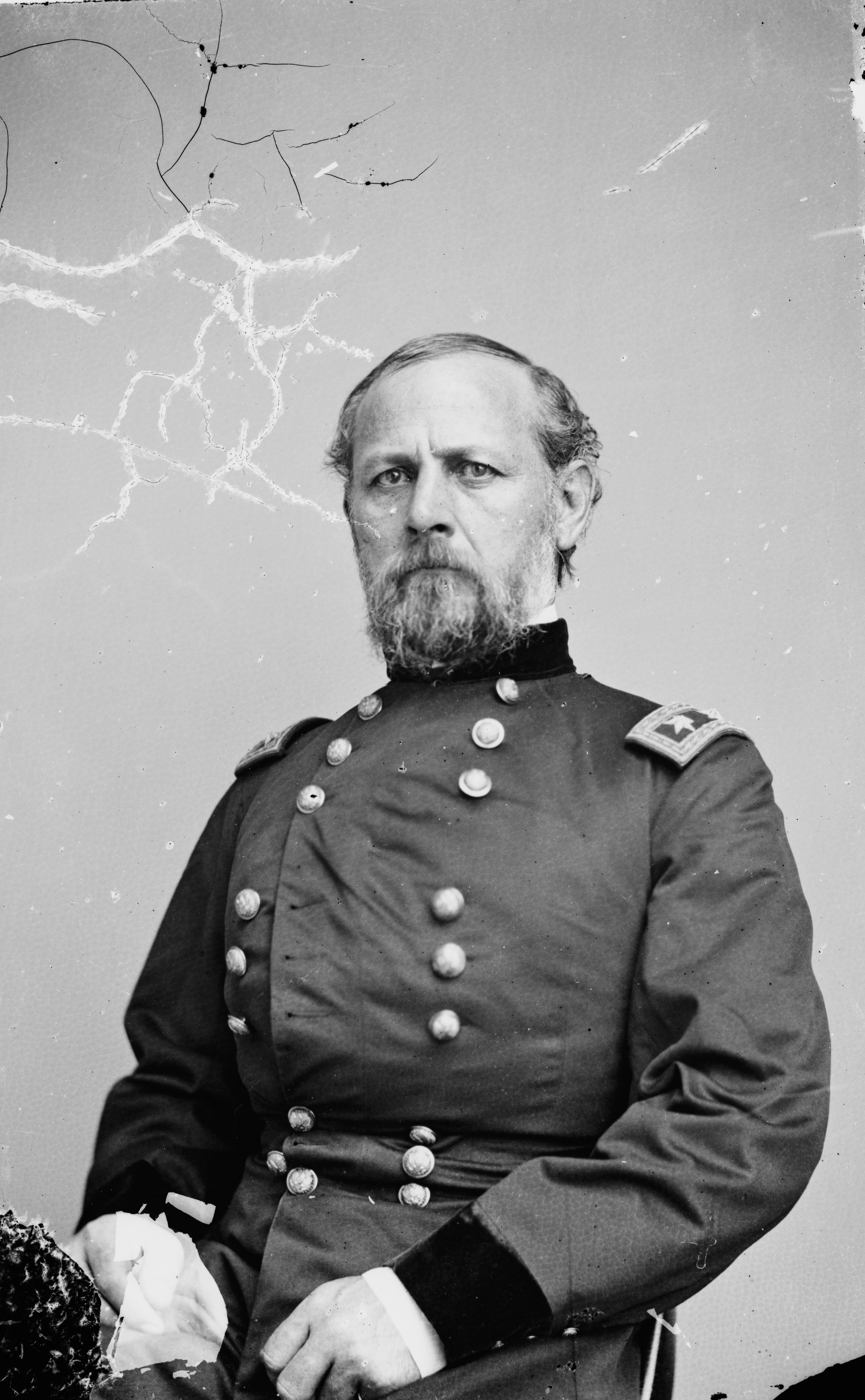
- Born: March 23, 1818; Lowell, Ohio, U.S.
- Died: November 19, 1898 (aged 80); Rockport, Kentucky, U.S.
- Burial place: Bellefontaine Cemetery, St. Louis, Missouri, U.S.
- Education: United States Military Academy Class of 1841
- Relatives: James P. Drake (paternal uncle); Priscilla Holmes Drake (paternal aunt)
- Military career
- Allegiance: United States (Union)
- Branch: United States Army; Union Army
- Service years: 1841–1864
- Rank: Major General
- Commands: Army of the Ohio
- Conflicts: Seminole War; Mexican–American War; Battle of Churubusco (WIA); American Civil War; Battle of Shiloh; Siege of Corinth; Battle of Perryville
- Other work: President of the Green River Iron Company, pension agent

Don Carlos Buell (March 23, 1818 – November 19, 1898) was a United States Army officer who fought in the Seminole War, the Mexican–American War, and the American Civil War. Buell led Union armies in two major Civil War battles—Shiloh and Perryville. The nation was angered at his failure to defeat the outnumbered Confederate Army after Perryville, or to secure East Tennessee. Historians generally concur that he was a brave and industrious master of logistics, but was too cautious and rigid to meet the challenges presented in 1862. Buell was relieved of field command in late 1862 and made no more significant military contributions before his resignation in 1864.

== Early life and education ==
Don Carlos Buell was born in Lowell, Ohio, the eldest of nine children born to Salmon and Elizabeth Buell. He was a first cousin of George P. Buell, also a Union general. Buell's father died when he was 8 years old, his uncle, James P. Drake and aunt Priscilla Holmes Drake took him in and raised him. As a child, Buell had a difficult time making friends due to his distant, introverted personality and was often made fun of by other children. After winning a fight with a neighborhood bully, he became awakened to the idea that discipline and determination could overcome any obstacle. Buell's uncle sent him to a Presbyterian school which stressed duty, self-discipline, patriotism, and belief in a Supreme Being.

George Buell obtained for his nephew an appointment to West Point, but despite his high intelligence and good math abilities, he accumulated numerous demerits and disciplinary problems and graduated in 1841 32nd in his class of 52. After graduation, Buell was commissioned a second lieutenant in the 3rd U.S. Infantry regiment and sent to fight in the Seminole Wars in Florida but did not see any combat. After the 3rd Infantry was transferred to Illinois, Buell found himself court-martialed for getting into an argument with an enlisted man and beating him over the head with the blunt end of his sword. However, an Army tribunal cleared him of any wrongdoing. There was considerable opposition to the verdict, and even General Winfield Scott felt that Buell needed to be punished for his actions, but the court would not retry the case.

In the Mexican–American War, he served under both Zachary Taylor and Winfield Scott. He was brevetted three times for bravery and was wounded at Churubusco. Between the wars he served in the U.S. Army Adjutant General's office and as an adjutant in California, reaching the rank of captain in 1851 and lieutenant colonel by the time the Civil War began.

== Civil War ==
=== Initial postings ===
At the start of the Civil War, Buell sought an important command, but instead his friend George McClellan emerged as the champion of the Union war effort. Buell himself was sent all the way out to California. After the Union defeat at Bull Run, McClellan summoned him back east where he was quickly promoted to brigadier general of volunteers, to rank from May 17, 1861. Buell received offers to take a command in Kentucky, but instead he stayed in Washington helping organize the nascent Army of the Potomac and being appointed as a division commander. In November, McClellan succeeded Winfield Scott as general-in-chief of the Army, and decided to post Buell out west, dividing the trans-Appalachia theater between him and Maj. Gen Henry Halleck.

In November 1861, Buell succeeded Brig. Gen. William T. Sherman in command at Louisville, Kentucky, as commander of the newly formed Army of the Ohio, which at this time was a barely-disciplined rabble. Buell immediately set himself to work shaping the raw recruits into a fighting force. Although the Lincoln administration pressured Buell to occupy Eastern Tennessee, an area of strong Unionist sentiment, Buell was in no hurry, and even McClellan became impatient with his slow progress. Buell's excuse was that the railroad network in this area was poor, and he would have to rely on wagons for army supply that could be vulnerable to Confederate cavalry. Instead, he proposed a coordinated effort between him and Halleck to cut off Nashville. Halleck reluctantly agreed to the plan, which was helped along by Grant's capture of Fort Henry and Fort Donelson. Although the city fell to the Army of the Ohio on February 25, 1862, Halleck's relationship with Buell was strained. The same month, Andrew Johnson was made military governor of Tennessee and developed a lasting grudge against Buell for failing to liberate Eastern Tennessee. On March 21, Buell was promoted to major general of volunteers, but at the same time, Halleck rose to department commander which made Buell subordinate to him.

=== Shiloh ===
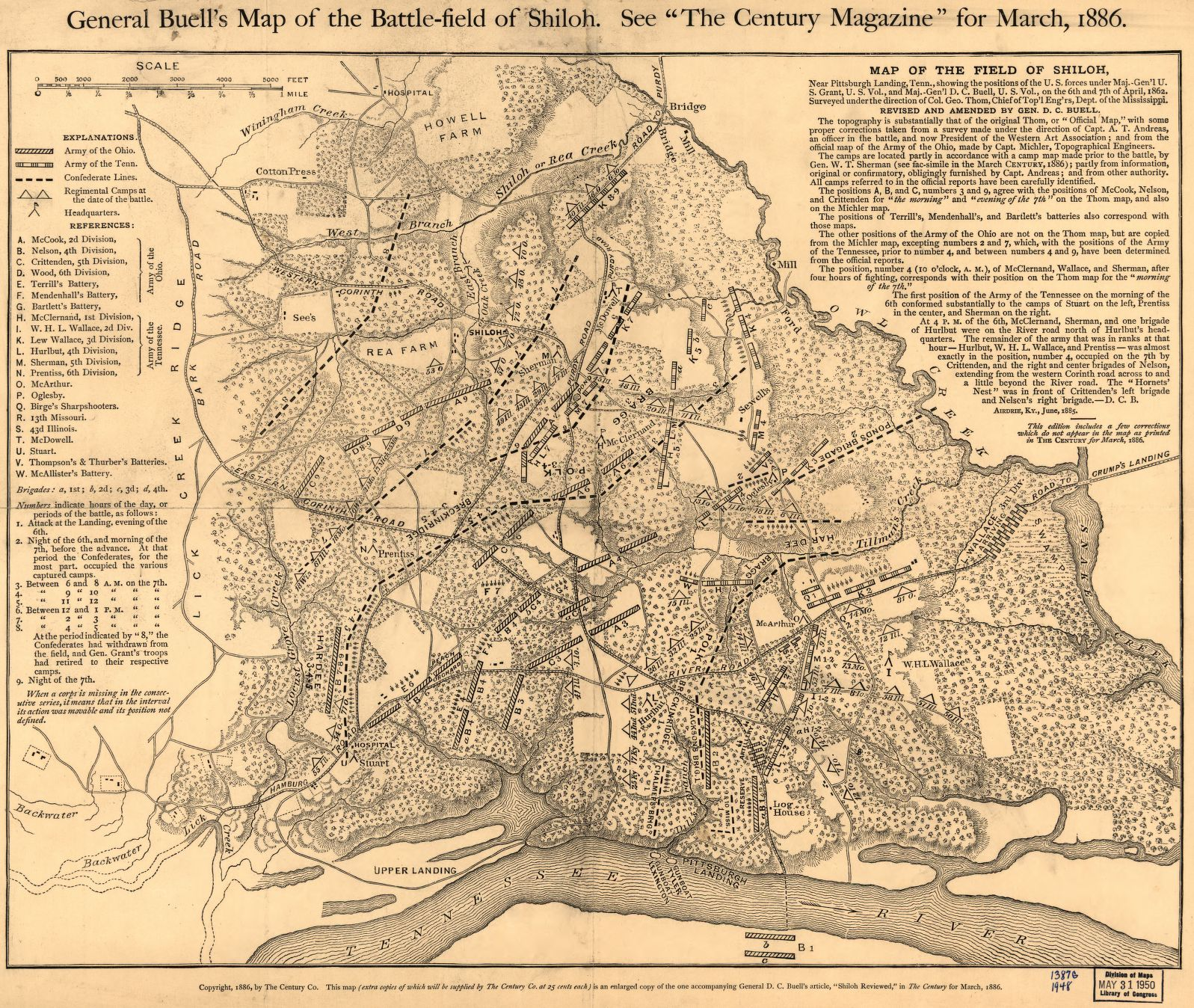
After the war Buell drafted and published a map of the Battle of Shiloh.

At the start of April, Buell was ordered to reinforce Grant's Army of the Tennessee, then encamped at Pittsburg Landing next to the Tennessee River. On the morning of April 6, the Confederates launched a surprise attack on Grant's army, beginning one of the largest and bloodiest battles of the war. After the Army of the Ohio arrived the next day, the combined Union forces repulsed the Confederates. Although Buell was the junior of the two generals in rank, he insisted that he was acting independently and would not accept orders from Grant. Buell considered himself the victor of Shiloh and denigrated Grant's contribution, writing after the war that he had no "marked influence that he exerted upon the fortune of the day." Contemporary historians, such as Larry Daniels and Kenneth W. Noe, consider that Grant actually saved himself by the conclusion of the first day of battle and that the rivalry between Grant and Buell hampered the conduct of battle on the second day. The commanders operated almost completely independently of each other and Buell "proved slow and hesitant to commit himself."

Following Shiloh, Governor Johnson objected to Buell's plans to withdraw the Nashville garrison on the grounds that Confederate sympathy in the city was still strong. However, Halleck sided with Buell and insisted that all available troops in the department were needed for the assault on Corinth. Henry Halleck arrived in person to take command of Grant and Buell's armies. The combined Union force, 100,000 men strong, began an extremely sluggish pursuit against P.G.T. Beauregard's Army of Mississippi, which had retreated into northern Mississippi. Despite a more than 2-1 numerical advantage, Halleck moved slowly. However, Buell was even slower and quickly caught the ire of Halleck. During the march to Corinth, Buell took extensive pauses to repair the railroad lines and would not entertain suggestions of allowing his army to live off the land. To that end, he court-martialed Col. John Turchin for allowing his soldiers to loot area homes. This action was not popular either with Buell's troops or the War Department, and President Lincoln ultimately overturned the verdict, while Turchin eventually got promoted to brigadier general.

The Siege of Corinth ended in the Confederates abandoning the city on May 25. Afterwards, Halleck split up the two armies and sent Buell eastward to capture Chattanooga while Grant remained in the Corinth area. In July, Halleck was summoned back to Washington to replace George McClellan as commander-in-chief of all Union armies, thus effectively returning the two Western armies to independent action. Buell's advance towards Chattanooga nearly rivaled the earlier march on Corinth for sluggishness, with extensive pauses to stop and repair railroad lines. When Nathan Bedford Forrest's cavalry then ransacked the Army of Ohio's supply lines, Buell all but terminated the effort to take Chattanooga. Thus after a busy winter and spring, activity in the Western theater during the summer of 1862 almost completely ground to a halt. On July 17, Buell was promoted to colonel in the regular army.

The summer months were increasingly frustrating for the Army of the Ohio, which was averaging barely a mile a day. Bored soldiers took to uncontrollable looting of the countryside and harassment of slaves. These infractions in their turn were punished harshly by Buell and by mid-August, morale in the army had almost collapsed. Despite protests from the War Department to move faster, Buell insisted that he could not hold Chattanooga for any length of time without proper caution and preparedness.

Grant, despite his professional rivalry following Shiloh, addressed these charges against Buell in his memoirs, writing:

General Buell was a brave, intelligent officer, with as much professional pride and ambition of a commendable sort as I ever knew. ... [He] became an object of harsh criticism later, some going so far as to challenge his loyalty. No one who knew him ever believed him capable of a dishonorable act, and nothing could be more dishonorable than to accept high rank and command in war and then betray the trust. When I came into command of the army in 1864, I requested the Secretary of War to restore General Buell to duty. ... The opportunity frequently occurred for me to defend General Buell against what I believed to be most unjust charges. On one occasion a correspondent put in my mouth the very charge I had so often refuted—of disloyalty. This brought from General Buell a very severe retort, which I saw in the New York World some time before I received the letter itself. I could very well understand his grievance at seeing untrue and disgraceful charges apparently sustained by an officer who, at the time, was at the head of the army. I replied to him, but not through the press. I kept no copy of my letter, nor did I ever see it in print; neither did I receive an answer.

=== Kentucky ===
In September, Confederate armies under Edmund Kirby Smith and Braxton Bragg invaded Kentucky and Buell was forced to take action. Buell wired Halleck that he planned to march on Louisville, but Halleck, already frustrated with his glacial movements in Tennessee, replied back that he did not care where Buell marched just as long as he was doing something to take the fight to the enemy. The Kentucky campaign did have the effect of re-energizing Buell's demoralized soldiers who were excited to finally be going somewhere and march into a state that had been mostly untouched by war. Louisville was occupied by the Army of the Ohio on September 25, but despite learning that Bragg's army was in nearby Munfordville, Buell, convinced that he was outnumbered, declined to pursue Bragg. A single corps of Buell's army was attacked by Bragg at the Battle of Perryville on October 8, 1862, while Buell, a couple of miles behind the action, was not aware that a battle was taking place until late in the day and thus did not effectively engage the full strength of his army to defeat the smaller enemy force. Buell was urged by his officers to counterattack the next day, but he refused on the grounds that he did not know exactly how many Confederates he was facing. By morning, Bragg ordered a retreat from the field. Although Perryville was tactically indecisive, it halted the Confederate invasion of Kentucky and forced their withdrawal back into Tennessee.

Although the battle ended with the Union army in possession of the field, the Confederates had escaped to fight another day, and Buell had not engaged most of his army in spite of having nearly 60,000 men to face a mere 16,000 Confederates. Even some of Buell's own officers and enlisted men began suspecting him of disloyalty, in part because he was one of a handful of Union generals to have owned slaves prior to the war. An Indiana artillery officer wrote "After Perryville, I became convinced that the sooner Buell was relieved of command of the Army of the Ohio, the better." When President Lincoln urged an immediate pursuit of Bragg, he was told by Buell that the route directly south from Perryville into Eastern Tennessee was rough, wooded country with few roads and would be too difficult to maneuver through. He said that the only sensible route was to go back west to Nashville, then travel east across Tennessee to Chattanooga. Halleck wired Buell telling him "The president does not understand why we cannot march as the enemy marches, live as he lives, and fight as he fights, unless we admit that there is some inherent defect in our generals and soldiers."

On October 24, Buell was relieved from command of the Army of the Ohio and replaced by Maj. Gen William Rosecrans. A military committee investigated Buell's conduct during and after Perryville, but came to no conclusions, and Buell considered his reputation vindicated as he did not compromise his principles in waging war. After his dismissal, he was ordered to Indianapolis to await future assignments, but none came. When Grant was appointed general-in-chief of the army in March 1864, he offered Buell a possible assignment but he refused to serve under either Sherman or George Thomas on the grounds that he outranked both of them. In his memoirs, Grant called this "the worst excuse a soldier can make for declining service". On May 23, Buell's volunteer commission expired and he reverted to the regular army rank of colonel. Unable to tolerate this demotion, he resigned from the army on June 1.

== Later life and death ==
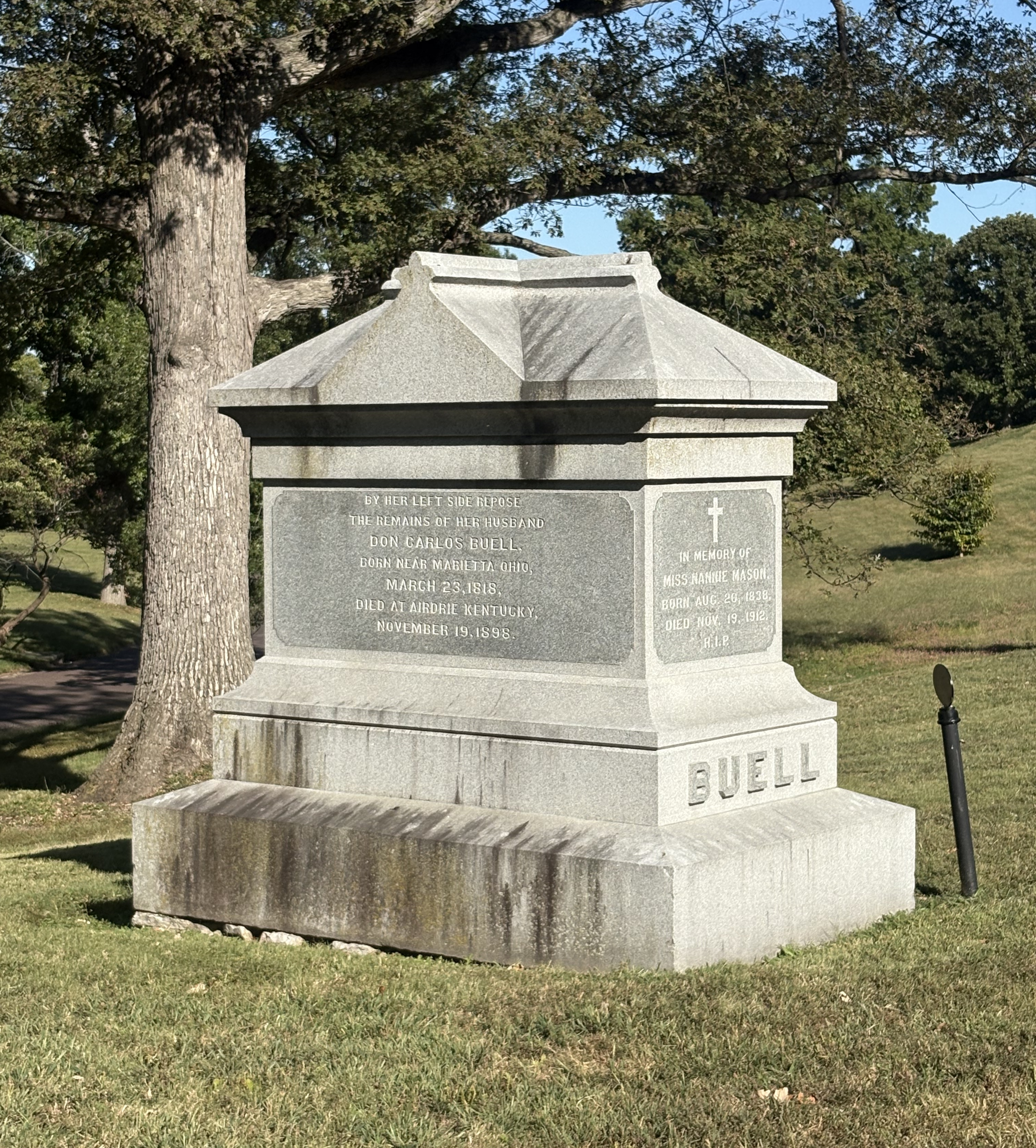
Buell's grave at Bellefontaine Cemetery

Following the war Buell lived again in Indiana, and then in Kentucky, employed in the iron and coal industry as president of the Green River Iron Company. He continued to be a target of criticism for his conduct during the war. Although Buell did not write any memoirs, he did produce a series of newspaper articles defending himself and criticizing Grant, particularly for the events at Shiloh, and Buell to his dying day maintained that he was the hero of the battle. The death of his wife in 1881 was very hard on him, and his final years were marked by poverty and ill health. By 1898 he was an invalid, and he died on November 19. He was buried in Bellefontaine Cemetery in St. Louis.

== Legacy ==
Buell earned the nickname "The McClellan of the West" for his cautious approach and desire for a limited war that would not disrupt civilian life in the South or interfere with slavery. Although he staunchly opposed secession, he was never able to reconcile himself with the Lincoln administration. Buell's wife had owned slaves prior to the war, although she freed them shortly after the Confederate attack on Fort Sumter. Buell had no personal animosity towards slavery or the Southern way of life. He continued to be highly regarded by fellow generals, many of whom felt that the White House had been unjust towards him. William T. Sherman wrote to his brother John, a Congressman, "You have driven off McClellan, and is Burnside any better? You have driven off Buell, and is Rosecrans any better?" His harsh discipline and inability to relate to his soldiers on a personal level may have also contributed to his downfall.

Buell Armory on the University of Kentucky campus in Lexington, Kentucky, is named after Buell.

Buell Island in his hometown of Lowell is named after him.

His personal papers, maps, correspondence, uniform, West Point diploma and other possessions are held at the University of Notre Dame.

== See also ==
- Buell Military Commission
- List of American Civil War generals (Union)
- Bibliography of Ulysses S. Grant
- Bibliography of the American Civil War

Military offices
Preceded by none	Commander of the Army of the Ohio; November 9, 1861 – October 24, 1862	Succeeded by William S. Rosecrans (renamed Army of the Cumberland)
