= Alice Baldridge =

Lawyer and suffragist (1874–1961)

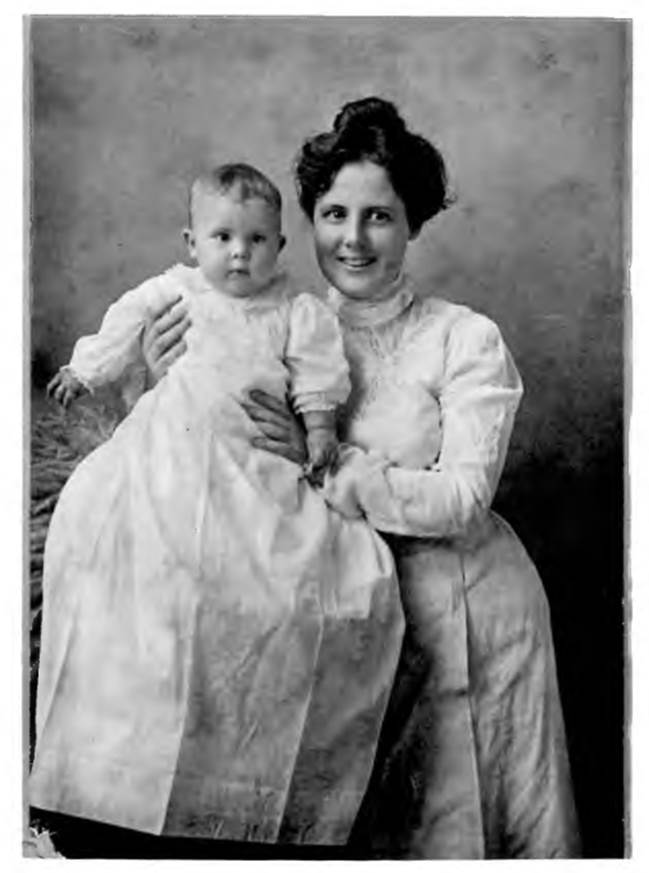
Alice Baldridge and her daughter, Vira Baldridge (1902)

Alice Boarman Baldridge (1874–1961) née Alice Ida Boarman, was an American lawyer and a suffrage leader during the early twentieth century. She gave suffragist speeches across the state of Alabama and was Madison County's first female attorney.

Boarman was born to John Robert Boarman and Cordelia Ida Terrell Boarman in New Orleans, Louisiana on August 21, 1874. Her law career spanned 39 years, in which she practiced in Huntsville, Alabama and later in New York, New York. She retired in 1957 and returned to Huntsville where she was then buried at Maple Hill Cemetery upon her death at age 87.

== Education ==
=== H. Sophie Newcomb Memorial College ===
Alice Baldridge attended H. Sophie Newcomb Memorial College and graduated in 1893. The school is now the H. Sophie Newcomb Memorial College Institute merged with Tulane University. Newcomb College was the first coordinate college to grant the baccalaureate degree to women in America, and they were dedicated to providing women with the same quality of education as the men of the Tulane College of Arts and Science. During her studies, she was a member of the Louisiana Alpha chapter of Pi Beta Phi sorority, of which she was one of the seven charter members alongside Josephine Craig Wickes, Anna P. Coyle, Isabella B. Coleman Weise, Lottie Fairfax Galleher Blacklock, Elizabeth Henderson Labrot and Mary Given Matthews Mcllhenny.

=== Wellesley College ===
Wanting to pursue a higher education, Baldridge enrolled at Wellesley College for post-graduate work so that her degree from a Southern women's college would be accepted nationwide. She was one of only two southern students to attend at the time, the other being Emery Cooney Tompkins, who was class historian and a member of the boat crew.

== Professional life ==
=== Law career ===
Upon her husband's death, Alice Baldridge attended correspondence law school in Chicago, Illinois and eventually passed the Alabama State Bar to become a full-fledged attorney. She attended school with a few other young women from Huntsville, two of which were thought to be Florence Bolling and Alberta Boswell She was granted her certificate that allowed her to practice in all civil and criminal courts of the state as one of very few women attorneys

While she resided in Huntsville during the early stages of her career, she practiced law with David A. Greyson. During this time, she undertook a case where she represented a teenage defendant who was accused of rape and won. This was one of her most remembered cases by her peers.

She was admitted to the New York State Bar in 1923 and practiced law as an associate attorney with Laughlin, Gerard, Bowers, and Halpin. Her later association was with the firm of John J. Halpin once the new Rockefeller Center was opened. By her retirement in 1957 the firm was named Halpin Keogh.

=== Leadership ===
Early in her career Alice Baldridge was elected to the new Huntsville Library Board and was described as one of its chief workers. With a passion for education and an immense love for her children, she was not willing to sacrifice mothering or education, and without the means for a tutor or governess, she obtained a teacher's certificate and tutored her young children herself.

==== Suffrage Activities (non-exhaustive) ====
- State chairman for the Empire State campaign committee (1913)
- Chairman of the New York suffrage referendum campaign after its defeat in 1915
- First vice-chair of the New York City Woman Suffrage Party
- Member of the National American Woman Suffrage Association

In her work, Vira organized mass suffrage parades, called for state conferences and meetings and dealt with foreign affairs, such as her collaboration with Hungarian-born suffragist Rosika Schwimmer. In her later years she bought a leather company which she renamed Whitehouse Leather Products Company and advocated for women in the workplace.

In 1916 Woodrow Wilson was running for re-election and would not publicly announce his support of suffrage until his speech before congress in 1918. During this time, Alice was nominated as a member of the Madison County School Board even though women did not yet have the right to vote. She was the first woman politician in Huntsville and was thought to be one of the first in all of Alabama as well. The slate included Alice alongside Joseph Brendle, J. A. Carpenter, M. F. Irwin, J. 0. Orman, H. C. Pollard, E. T. Terry, and E. 0. Williamson.

The Huntsville Times ran an article on May 7, 1916, just prior to her election to announce that Alice was one of ten women candidates, that her friends and colleagues were confident in her abilities, and that she would win a nice majority. This would also be the first time that the men of Huntsville would have the opportunity of voting for a woman at the polls. In an article for the Huntsville Mercury in 1916, she was quoted to say that the notion of women holding office was so new that she feared there would be prejudice against her, but that she felt it would serve a good purpose for the women that would succeed her.

In 1918, Alice declined her candidacy for re-election as she had just passed the Alabama State Bar and was considering leaving Madison County. Her successor was thought to Mrs. W. I. Thompson, who was president of the Civic league and a popular candidate at the time.

=== Distinctions ===
==== Hunstsville ====
- President of the League of Women Voters local chapter
- Vice President of the Carnegie Board of a local library (in which she secured a Carnegie Grant)
- Chairman for the League of Women Voters
- Founding member of the Huntsville Equal Suffrage Association
- Chairman of the Madison County branch of the Four Minute Speakers movement
- Chairman of the election committee for the Madison County Queen Contest

==== New York ====
- Member of the American Women's Association
- Member of the National Association of Women's Lawyers
- Member of the Colony Club of New York

=== Publications and speeches ===
Alice Baldridge edited an edition of the Huntsville Evening Tribune in 1904 showcasing photographs of Huntsville locals, as well as publishing local interest articles.

For The Selma Times on November 25, 1917, she wrote an article titled "Personal Experiences and Adventures in the Quest of Suffr'ge Grail" where she expressed her passion and frustrations with the struggles of the suffrage movement, as well as her bemusement with anti-suffrage sentiments regarding the feminization of government. Alongside her opinions regarding the placement of women in society, Alice also wrote on her experience as a suffrage watcher in New York and how she got to witness her own son cast his first vote in support of women's suffrage.

She was thought to be one of the best woman speakers in the state and delivered suffrage speeches throughout Alabama. She was selected by state organization to speak at Washington, D.C. to plead for the enfranchisement of women before she left Madison County for New York in 1922. She continued to advocate for women's suffrage and gave suffrage speeches while practicing law in New York.

== Travels ==
Before her eventual 1922 move to New York to practice law, Alice Baldrige undertook a trip around the world for a year in 1920 to accompany a friend and to act as a chaperone. She was requested by The Huntsville Times to send letters recounting her travels, to which she obliged. Her travels began in August 1920 when she headed to New York City to meet a group of friends, to which they then traveled to San Francisco, California. She wrote of her travels in places including Hawaii, Japan, Egypt, India, and China. She returned to Huntsville in July 1921
