= Pattie Ruffner Jacobs =

American suffragist (1875–1935)

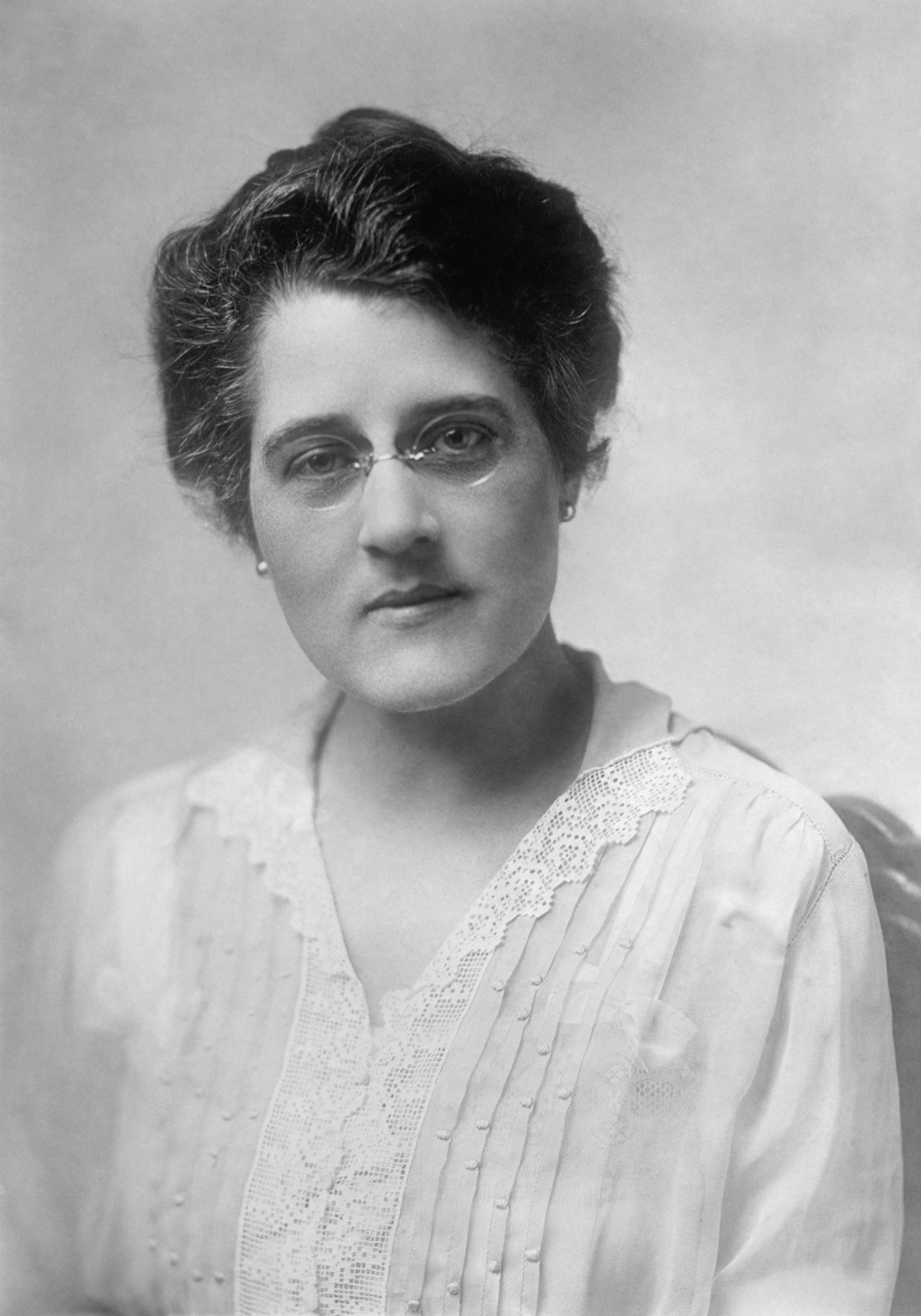
- Jacobs, c. 1918-21
- Born: Pattie Ruffner; October 2, 1875; West Virginia, U.S.
- Died: December 22, 1935 (aged 60)
- Resting place: Elmwood Cemetery, Birmingham, Alabama
- Education: Ward's Seminary
- Occupation: Suffragist
- Spouse: Solon Harold Jacobs

Pattie Ruffner Jacobs (sometimes spelled Patti or Patty; October 2, 1875 – December 22, 1935) was an American suffragist from Birmingham, Alabama. She was inducted into the Alabama Women's Hall of Fame in 1978.

== Life ==
Pattie Ruffner was born October 2, 1875, in West Virginia. She was educated at Ward's Seminary in Nashville, Tennessee, but was unable to continue her studies during the economic crisis of the 1890s. Her parents' marriage dissolved during that period and Pattie moved with her mother to Birmingham to stay with an older sister's family.

Ruffner married Birmingham businessman Solon Jacobs and took advantage of his means to travel and to enroll in voice classes in New York City. Over time, she became more politically active in the swirl of Progressivic schools that Jacobs concluded that women's suffrage was necessary to achieve social reforms through the political process. She founded the Birmingham Equal Suffrage Association in 1910, followed by the Alabama Equal Suffrage Association a year later. In 1913, Jacobs spoke on behalf of Southern women's suffragists at the Annual Convention of the National American Woman Suffrage Association (NAWSA) in Washington D. C.

When speaking before the United States House of Representatives in 1915, Jacobs invoked the legacy of white women who had proved their "worthiness and trustworthiness" through their loyalty to the South "50 years ago"—alluding to white women's continued allegiance to the Confederacy in 1865, the year of the end of the Civil War and the abolition of slavery. Metaphorically standing on the shoulders of these women, Jacobs argued to her fellow Democrats in the audience that "in my own State of Alabama there are 142,000 more white women than negro women so that if the wish of the southern people is to maintain white supremacy, according to Chief Justice Walter Clark of North Carolina, the white women of these States must at least be elevated to the same political plane as the negro men."

Jacobs and her colleagues nearly succeeded in putting a statewide suffrage referendum on the ballot in 1915, but opponents played up fears that giving women the vote would increase the political power of African Americans. The AESA then turned its efforts toward promoting a national suffrage amendment.

Jacobs was elected as an officer in the National Equal Suffrage Association in 1915. After the passage of the 19th Amendment, Jacobs led the transition of her local organizations into Leagues of Women Voters. In 1927, she became national secretary for the National League of Women Voters.

Jacobs led efforts toward other socially-progressive laws as well, such as a failed attempt to establish an 8-hour work day. Presidents Herbert Hoover and Franklin Roosevelt recognized her leadership with appointments to various commissions, such as the Consumer Advisory Board of the National Recovery Administration and as a spokeswoman for the Tennessee Valley Authority. In 1933 she was the first woman appointed to the Democratic National Committee from Alabama, a position she held until her death two years later on December 22, 1935.

Jacobs is buried in Birmingham's Elmwood Cemetery.
