= Priscilla Holmes Drake =

American suffragist (1812–1892)

Priscilla Holmes Buell Drake
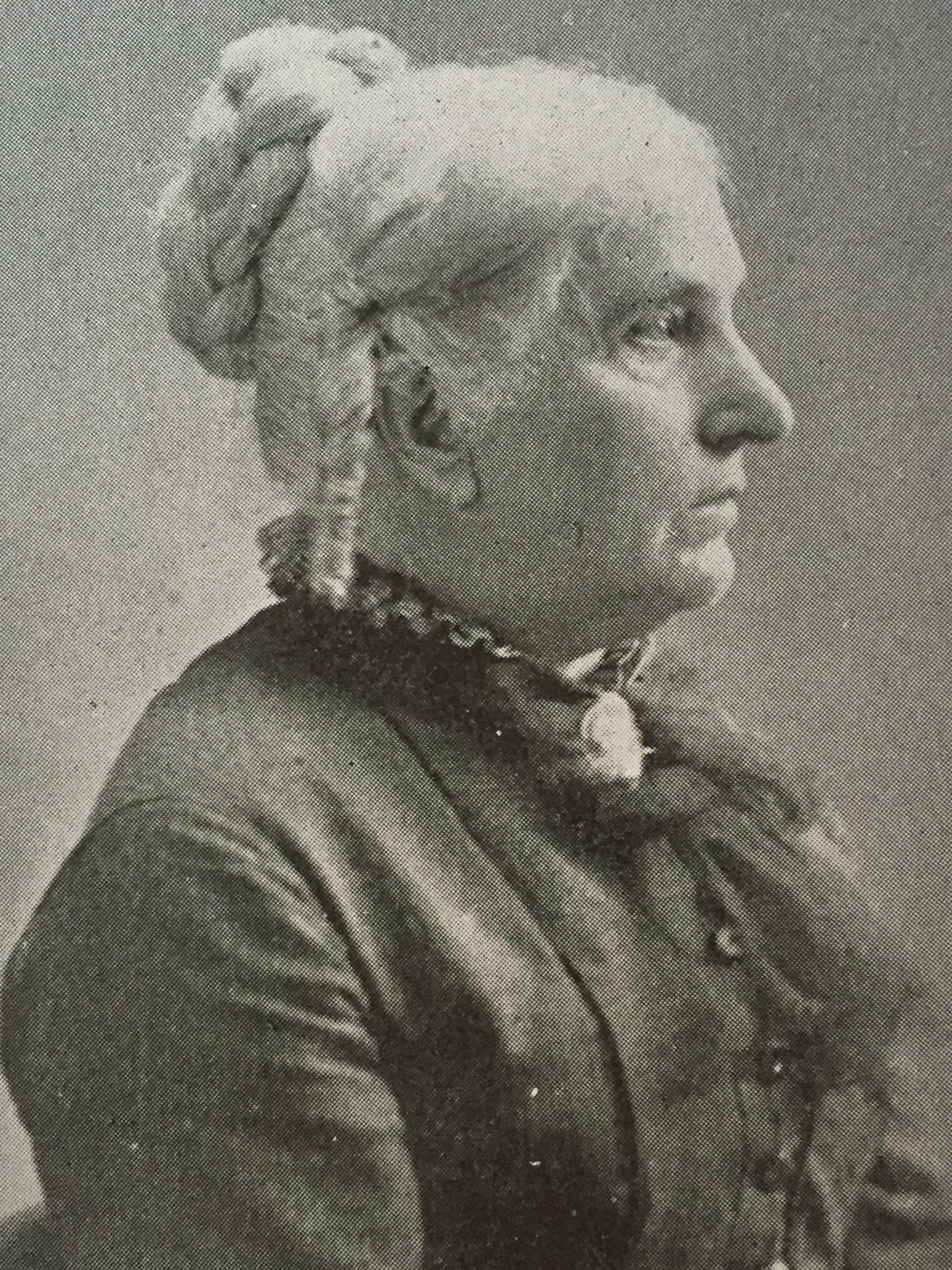
- Born: June 18, 1812; Ithaca, New York
- Died: February 11, 1892 (aged 79); Huntsville, Alabama, U.S.
- Known for: American suffragist
- Spouse: James Perry Drake (1797-1876)
- Parents: Judge Samuel/Salmon Buell (father); Joanna Sturdevant (mother)

Priscilla Holmes Buell Drake (June 18, 1812 - February 11, 1892) was an American suffragist.

== Early life ==
Priscilla Holmes Buell Drake was born in Ithaca, New York, on June 18, 1812. She was the youngest child of Judge Samuel/Salmon Buell (1764–1828) and Joanna Sturdevant, both of Cayuga County, New York. Judge Buell was a man of much intellectual vigor and marked attainments. He held several important offices in his State, and as senator served more than one term with De Witt Clinton, Martin Van Buren and others of distinction. Judge Buell moved with his family from New York to Marietta, Ohio, where he was held in great esteem.

== Career ==
Drake and her husband worked with Robert Dale Owen during the Indiana Constitutional Convention of 1850 and 1851 to remove the legal disabilities of women. Before the sections were presented, which worked such benefit to women, they were discussed, line by line, in Drake's parlor. She had an acute legal mind, and Owen was not slow to recognize her valuable aid in the construction of the important clauses. It was she who suggested a memorial to Robert Dale Owen from the many noble mothers who comprehended the scope of his work for women. When Lucy Stone delivered her first lecture in Indianapolis, Drake was the only woman in attendance. She was also present at a notable meeting, shortly afterward, when Lucretia Mott presided. The acquaintance thus formed led to an interesting correspondence. Drake was in possession of main valuable letters from distinguished men and women, addressed to herself and husband.

== Personal life ==
Priscilla Holmes Drake became the wife of James Perry Drake (1797–1876), a native of North Carolina, at Lawrenceburg, Indiana. He had held office under President Monroe and was then receiver of public moneys in Indianapolis, Indiana, appointed by President Jackson. While a resident of Posey County, Indiana, he had been brought into intimate business and social relations with the New Harmony Community, under the Rapps, father and son, and when their possessions were transferred to the Scotch philanthropist, Robert Owen, he naturally held the same relations with the Owen association. Those two communities, although striving in different ways to benefit humanity, had much to do with broadening his views and making his after-life tolerant and charitable, and probably had an influence in developing his young wife's interest in the laws relating to women. Their home was the center of happiness and progress, and it was only widening the circle of early associations to find therein a hearty welcome for David, Richard and Robert Dale Owen, the distinguished soils of Robert Owen.

In 1861 they moved to Alabama, near Huntsville, where they continued their interest and work in the cause of woman's suffrage. Drake was left a widow in 1876 and died at her residence, on February 11, 1892, and is buried at Maple Hill Cemetery (Huntsville, Alabama). She was the mother of seven children, among whom Annie Buell Drake Robertson (1841–1930), four of whom survived her.

Her nephew was Civil War Major General Don Carlos Buell.
