= List of Manhattanville University alumni =

Manhattanville University, previously called Manhattanville College, is a private university in Purchase, New York, United States. The following is a list of some of the notable alumni of the university.

== Academia ==
- Adele Chatfield-Taylor – president and CEO of the American Academy in Rome, 1988–2013
- Mary T. Clark – chair of Christian Philosophy at Manhattanville College
- Katharine Gibbs – founder of Gibbs College, for-profit institution founded in 1911
- Sean Lavery – composer; Director of Liturgical and Music Development at the Metropolitan Cathedral of the Immaculate Conception in Ozamiz in the Philippines; Director of Sacred Music at St Patrick's College, Maynooth, Ireland
- Jane D. Schaberg – professor of religious studies and women's studies at the University of Detroit Mercy
- Kathleen Wilber – professor of gerontology, University of Southern California

== Art and architecture ==
- Hildreth Meiere – architectural artist, muralist and mosaicist; first woman to win the Fine Arts Medal of the American Institute of Architects
- Carmen Marc Valvo – fashion designer

== Business and philanthropy ==
- James de Givenchy – jewelry designer and owner of the jewelry company, Taffin
- Mindy Grossman – CEO of HSN, Inc., ranked #22 in Fortune's Top People in Business, 2014
- Marion S. Kellogg – first woman vice president of General Electric
- Maria Elena Lagomasino – CEO of Asset Management Advisors, an affiliate of SunTrust Banks; director of The Coca-Cola Company; former chairman and CEO of JP Morgan Private Bank; 2007 Hispanic Business Woman of the Year
- Josie Natori – president of The Natori Company
- Michaela Walsh - founder of Women's World Banking
- Marion G. Wells – founder and president of the Marion G. Wells Foundation

== Entertainment ==
- Karen Akers – singer, actress, Theatre World Award winner and Tony Award nominee (Nine, Grand Hotel, Heartburn, The Purple Rose of Cairo)
- Matt Braunger – actor, writer and stand-up comedian (MADtv)
- Meg Bussert – Broadway actress, singer, and academic (The Music Man, Brigadoon, Camelot)
- Christine Choy – documentary film maker (Who Killed Vincent Chin?)
- Rosemary Murphy – film, stage, and television actress (To Kill a Mockingbird, Walking Tall, Eleanor and Franklin)
- Kitty Pilgrim – Emmy, Peabody, and duPont award-winning CNN News anchor and correspondent
- David Sahadi – television producer
- Dalmazio Santini – composer
- Carol Sauvion – executive producer and director, Craft in America, Peabody Award-winning, Emmy-nominated, PBS documentary series
- Maria Shriver – television new anchor, former First Lady of California
- Tina Sloan – film and television actress (Guiding Light)
- Brittany Underwood – actress and singer (One Life to Live and Hollywood Heights)

== Law ==
- Mary Hamilton – Freedom Rider, Congress of Racial Equality field secretary, appelant in the landmark U.S. Supreme Court case, Hamilton v. Alabama (1964)
- Daryl A. Mundis – senior trial attorney at The Hague for the Slobodan Milošević trial

== Literature ==
- Sook Nyul Choi – children's author
- Rosario Ferré – writer, poet, essayist, First Lady of Puerto Rico, and professor at the University of Puerto Rico
- Lindsay Barrett George – author and illustrator of children's books
- Olga Nolla – poet, journalist, resident writer at Universidad Metropolitana
- Mary Perkins Ryan – Catholic writer
- Nan A. Talese – editor and senior vice president of Doubleday
- Patricia Nell Warren – novelist (The Front Runner), essayist, lesbian and gay rights activist

== Politics and government ==
=== Politicians ===
- Kathleen Sullivan Alioto – chairperson of the Boston School Committee
- Jamaal Bowman – educator and congressman for New York's 16th congressional district in the U.S. House of Representatives
- Sila Calderón – politician, businesswoman, and former Governor of Puerto Rico
- Fred Camillo – politician, First Selectman, Greenwich, Connecticut
- Janice Lachance – director of the United States Office of Personnel Management, member of the Federal Salary Council, and CEO of the Special Libraries Association
- Barbara Boggs Sigmund – former mayor of Princeton, New Jersey
- Jean Kennedy Smith – diplomat and former U.S. Ambassador to Ireland
- Beatrice Welters (B.A., 1974), United States Ambassador to Trinidad and Tobago

=== Political family members ===
- Ethel Skakel Kennedy – widow of U.S. Senator Robert F. Kennedy; founder of the Robert F. Kennedy Memorial Center
- Joan Bennett Kennedy – writer, musician, former wife of U.S. Senator Edward M. Kennedy
- Rose Kennedy – mother of U.S. President John F. Kennedy

== Religion ==
- Eileen Niedfield (non-degreed) – Medical Mission Sisters nun, physician, and medical missionary
- Nancy Salisbury – Roman Catholic religious sister and headmistress the Convent of the Sacred Heart
- Steven R Schimmel – executive director of the Jewish Federation of Central Massachusetts

== Science and medicine ==
- Anita Figueredo – first woman medical doctor from Costa Rica and the first woman surgeon to practice in San Diego, California
- Jane Briggs Hart – aviator and a Mercury 13 women

== Sports ==
- Myles Fee - NHL professional ice hockey coach
- Mickey Lang – professional ice hockey player for the Toronto Marlies
