= List of Armenian businesspeople =

This is a list of Armenian business people.

== Aerospace and aviation ==
- Eduardo Eurnekian, owner of airports in Argentina, and Yerevan Airport
- Artem Mikoyan, founder of Mikoyan, MiG
- Mikhail Pogosyan, CEO of Sukhoi Design Bureau, and MiG Russian fighter jets manufacturer

== Banking, finance, insurance and investment banking ==
=== Russia ===
- Ruben Aganbegyan, CEO of Russia of Renaissance Capital, president of Micex
- Ashot Egiazaryan, banker; deputy of the Russian State Duma
- Samvel Karapetyan, founder and President of Tashir Group

=== United States ===
- Charles A. Agemian, former executive vice president of Chase Manhattan Bank
- Granger K. Costikyan, longtime partner of Brown Brothers Harriman
- Richard Donchian, pioneer Wall Street financier
- Mary Ellen Iskenderian, CEO and president of Women's World Banking and former senior executive of World Bank
- Steven A. Kandarian, former executive vice president and chief investment officer of MetLife
- Paul Kazarian, hedge fund manager
- Kirk Kerkorian, businessman, investor, and philanthropist, billionaire, the president and CEO of Tracinda Corporation, 10th largest donor in the US, He was bestowed the title of National Hero of Armenia, the highest state award
- Robert Mehrabian, board member of Bank of New York Mellon

== Entrepreneurs ==
=== General ===
- Noubar Afeyan, co-founder of the biotechnology company Moderna
- Arsen Borysovych Avakov, Governor of Kharkov region (2005–2010) and businessman in Ukraine, Minister of Internal Affairs of Ukraine (2014–2021)
- Ian Bremmer, President of Eurasia Group
- Gerard Cafesjian, businessman, private investor and former board member of West Publishing
- Catchick Paul Chater, businessman in Hong Kong
- Larry Gagosian, founder of Gagosian Gallery
- Sergey Galitsky, Russian retail operator, Magnit
- Artem Khachatryan, co-founder of Russian retail operator, FixPrice
- Paul Garmirian, founder and owner of P.G. Cigars
- Arsen Gasparyan, former Armenian press secretary, publisher and cigar manufacturer
- Rafi Haladjian, founder of FranceNet internet service provider
- Kevork Hovnanian, Chairman of Hovnanian Enterprises; homebuilder
- Samvel Karapetyan, owner of Tashir
- Kirk Kerkorian, investor
- Alex Manoogian, founder of Masco
- Matild Manukyan, businesswoman; real estate
- Stephen P. Mugar, Founder of Star Market
- Armen Sarkissian, Chairman of Knightsbridge Group, former Prime Minister of Armenia
- David Shakarian, founder of GNC
- Artyom Tarasov, Russian businessman, the first officially declared millionaire in the USSR
- Carl Tchilinghiryan, German-Armenian businessman and entrepreneur, co-founder of Tchibo
- Gagik Tsarukian, businessman in Armenia
- Daniel Ustian, Chairman of Navistar
- Hrant Vardanyan, businessman in Armenia; founder and Chairman of Grand Holding
- Avedis Zildjian, founder of Zildjian
- Leonid Dovladbegyan, entrepreneur, top manager, venture capitalist

=== High technology ===
- Andrey Andreev, founder and owner of Badoo
- Boris Babayan, founder of MCST
- Alexis Ohanian, internet entrepreneur, co-founder of Reddit
- Avie Tevanian, former CTO of Apple and creator of macOS operating system, partner at Elevation Partners
- Hovhannes Avoyan, co-founder and CEO of PicsArt
- Levon Oganesyan, co-founder of Delivery Club
- Hayk Ayrapetyan, co-founder of GeekBrains Edtech platform
- Tigran Sloyan and Aram Shatakhstyan, co-founders of CodeSignal
- Artavazd Minasyan, co-founder of Krisp and 10Web
- Davit Baghdasaryan, co-founder of Krisp
- Ara Mahdessian and Vahe Kuzoyan, founders of ServiceTitan
- Aram Arakelyan and Oganes Arakelyan, founders of CityMobil

=== Oil and gas ===
- Pavel Gusakov, industrialist who with his brother, Abram, played a major role in the industrialisation of the oil industry of Imperial Russia
- Calouste Gulbenkian, one of the founders of Royal Dutch Shell, oil magnate
- Alexander Mantashev, oil magnate, industrialist, financier, and philanthropist
- Stepan Lianozov, impact on the oil industry in Baku was considerable and became known as the "Russian Rockefeller"

== Executives ==
- Carole Black, CEO and president of Lifetime Entertainment
- Eduardo Eurnekian, president of Aeropuertos Argentina 2000
- Vartan Gregorian, president of Carnegie Corporation
- Ron Hovsepian, non-executive chairman of the board of Ann Taylor and CEO and president of Novell
- Steven A. Kandarian, CEO and president of MetLife
- Tigran Khudaverdyan, deputy CEO of Yandex
- Robert Mirzoyan, CEO of Wildberries
- Robert Mehrabian, board member of CME Group and Bank of New York Mellon
- Tro Piliguian, chairman of Ogilvy and COO of WPP
- Eduard Sarkisov, vice-president of Rusneft
- Roger Tatarian, former editor-in-chief and executive VP of United Press International
- Serge Tchuruk, former chairman of Alcatel

== Fashion ==
- Patricia Field, US fashion designer
- Francis Kurkdjian, owner of perfume house Maison Francis Kurkdjian
- Alain Mikli, designer
- Carolyn Rafaelian, founder and owner of accessories and jewelry company Alex and Ani
- Valerie Toranian, editor in chief (French Edition) of Elle

== Film and television industry ==
=== Argentina ===
- Martín Karadagián, Argentine actor

=== Russia ===
- Lev Atamanov, director of Soyuzmultfilm
- Anna Melikian, director, owner of Magnum Studios
- Armen Oganesyan, CEO of Voice of Russia
- Karen Shakhnazarov, CEO of Mosfilm
- Margarita Simonyan, editor-in-chief of RT (formerly Russia Today)

=== United States ===
- Alex Yemenidjian, former CEO and chairman of MGM Studios

== Lawyers ==
- Mark Geragos, defense attorney who defended Michael Jackson
- Robert Kardashian, defense attorney who defended O. J. Simpson
- Karinna Moskalenko, Russian human rights lawyer

== Sports ==
- Henrikh Mkhitaryan, professional footballer; midfielder for Italian Serie A team FC Internazionale Milano and captain of the Armenia national team
- Yura Movsisyan, professional footballer; forward for Major League Soccer team Real Salt Lake and of the Armenia national team
- Nikita Simonyan, First Vice-President of the Russian Football Union

== Video game and software industry ==
- Greg Costikyan, game designer
- Alex Seropian, founder of Bungie and developer of the Halo video game series
- Bagrat Dabaghyan, programmed Shadowmatic
