= Karmir =

Karmir in Armenian (or Garmir in Western Armenian) means red. It may also refer to:

- Karmir Aghek, a village in the Lori Province of Armenia
- Karmir-Astkh, a rural locality (a khutor) in Kuzhorskoye Rural Settlement of Maykopsky District, in the Adygea Republic of Russia
- Karmir-Blur or Teishebaini, a capital of the Transcaucasian provinces of the ancient kingdom of Urartu
- Karmir Gyugh or Karmirgyugh, a major village in the Gegharkunik Province of Armenia
- Karmir Kar or Qızılqaya, Kalbajar, a village in the Kalbajar Rayon of Azerbaijan
- Karmir-Kulali also, Kulali, a town in the Tavush Province of Armenia
- Karmir Shuka or Qirmizi Bazar, a village in the Khojavend Rayon of the Karabakh region in Azerbaijan
- Karmir Vank, or Artsvanik, a village and rural community (municipality) in the Syunik Province of Armenia

== See also ==
- Vordan karmir or Armenian cochineal, a scale insect indigenous to the Ararat plain and Aras (Araks) River valley in the Armenian Highlands. Formerly used to produce an eponymous crimson carmine dyestuff known in Armenia as vordan karmir (literally "worm's red") and historically in Persia as kirmiz.
- Verin Karmir aghpyur or Verin Karmiraghbyur, a town in the Tavush Province of Armenia
- Garmirian or Paul Garmirian (cigar brand) or P.G, a cigar brand named after its founder, Armenian-American cigar connoisseur Paul Garmirian
