= Cyd McKenna =

Cyd McKenna is an American political operative, civil servant, author, public policy researcher and public relations consultant from Providence, Rhode Island, who was campaign manager for Buddy Cianci's 2014 mayoral campaign, and community outreach director for the 2015 campaign by the Pawtucket Red Sox ownership group to build a new stadium in Providence. Later that year she was hired by City Council President Luis Aponte to be chief of staff of the Providence City Council, and left that office after Aponte was indicted for felony embezzlement and resigned.

== Early life and education ==
McKenna grew up on the East Side of Providence, Rhode Island, and graduated from Hope High School. She holds a BA in urban studies from San Francisco State University, a master's degree in city planning from MIT, and a master's degree in education from the Harvard Graduate School of Education. She has lived in Boston, San Francisco, Washington, D.C., and Durham, North Carolina, before returning to Providence in late 2015 to work at the Providence City Council.

== Career ==
=== Cianci's second administration ===
McKenna worked in the policy office of the second administration of Buddy Cianci (1991–2002). Of her work, Cianci said, "She was responsible for the historic preservation efforts downtown, as well as the Eagle Square project."

=== Alex and Ani ===
McKenna served as lifestyle editor and corporate historian for Rhode Island jewelry manufacturer Alex and Ani. She coauthored a 2013 book with former CEO and Republican gubernatorial candidate Giovanni Feroce, entitled Path of Life: Why I Wear My Alex and Ani. In an interview, McKenna described the book as based on feedback from customers, saying, "We have one customer in TN whose son was getting treatments at a New England Children’s Hospital. As a Mom, our bangles had real healing properties for both her son and her, and it was stories like this one that became the impetus to write the book."

=== Buddy Cianci mayoral campaign, 2014 ===
McKenna was named campaign manager for former mayor Buddy Cianci's final campaign for mayor of Providence. McKenna was hired along with former Cianci staffers Charles Mansolillo and Beryl Kenyon. Of Cianci, McKenna said, "I believe in Buddy and everything he's done for Providence, and his leadership now is what is needed to take Providence to the next level."

The Providence Journal reported that the Cianci campaign paid McKenna in 2014 at an address in Chapel Hill, North Carolina, according to campaign finance reports that showed 11 checks sent to that address between August and November 2014.

=== Pawtucket Red Sox stadium campaign, 2015 ===
McKenna served as spokesperson and community outreach director for the Pawtucket Red Sox ownership group during their 2015 campaign to build a new stadium on Providence's waterfront. She helped pitch the project as part of "listening tour" meetings throughout Rhode Island.

At the time, McKenna was a resident of Durham, North Carolina, where a baseball stadium had been built in 1995 and was used by the Pawtucket Red Sox ownership group as an example of successful stadium development project.

=== Duke University ===
While living in North Carolina, McKenna was a research associate with Duke University's center for Research on the Education and Development of Youth (REDY). She returned to Providence in 2015 to take a job with the City Council.

=== City Council chief of staff ===
In November 2015, McKenna was hired by the Providence City Council to serve as its chief of staff, reporting to Council President Luis Aponte, whom she called a "thoughtful urbanist."

At the time, her connections to powerful advisors such as Buddy Cianci, Joseph R. Paolino Jr. and Artin Coloian, former chief of staff to Buddy Cianci, were among the factors cited as benefiting her new role.

After Aponte was indicted for felony embezzlement and resigned in 2017, she was replaced as chief of staff on the first day after the election of new Council President David Salvatore.

== Awards ==
McKenna was named one of Providence Monthly's Ten to Watch for 2016.

McKenna was one of the winners of the 2011 Fabulous at Every Age contest, held by Harper's Bazaar.
