= List of Alpha Xi Delta members =

Alpha Xi Delta is a women's fraternity founded on April 17, 1893, at Lombard College in Galesburg, Illinois.

== Art and architecture ==
- Ella Lillian Wall Van Leer (Gamma Eta) – artist and architect, women's rights activist

== Business ==
- Zula Inez Ferguson (Xi) – advertising manager for Blackstone's
- Betsey Johnson (Eta) – fashion designer
- Kelley Earnhardt Miller (Zeta Chi) – vice president and general manager of JR Motorsports
- Carolyn Rafaelian (Beta Upsilon) – founder of Alex and Ani bracelets

== Entertainment ==
- Nancy Tribble Benda (Alpha Omega) – actress and a pioneer of early educational television with her show Miss Nancy’s Store
- Megan Blake (Gamma Eta) – actress, The Young and the Restless, The Opposite Sex, It Takes Two; Miss Georgia 1983
- Ava Ernst (Theta) - Miss Minnesota Teen USA 2022
- Chrissie Fit (Theta Xi) – actress, Pitch Perfect 2, Pitch Perfect 3
- Jane Henson (Beta Eta) – co-founder of the Muppets with her husband, Jim Henson
- Carol Lawrence (Alpha Theta) – actress, singer, and dancer
- Patsy Ramsey (Iota) – Miss West Virginia 1977 and mother of Jonbenet Ramsey
- Laurie Lea Schaefer (Pi) – actress and Miss America 1972
- Bobbie Wygant (Alpha Eta) – television news reporter, film critic, and talk show host

== Literature and journalism ==
- Carol Aebersold (Gamma Chi) - Creator of Elf on The Shelf book and toys
- Ann Hood (Beta Upsilon) - Best selling author of fiction and nonfiction books
- Karen Tumulty (Beta Alpha) – national political correspondent for Time magazine and The Washington Post

== Military ==
- Polly Peyer – Retired major general in the U.S. Air Force

== Politics ==
- Anne Clarke (Delta Tau) – Labour Party London Assembly member
- Nabilah Islam (Delta Xi) – Georgia state senator for the 7th district
- Anne Mackenzie (Gamma Mu) – Florida House of Representatives
- Karen Muenster (Rho) – South Dakota state senator for the 15th district
- Deborah Pryce (Psi) – U.S. Representative from Ohio

== Science and engineering ==
- Jan Davis (Gamma Eta) – NASA astronaut
- Janet Dietrich (Omicron) – one of the Mercury 13

== Other ==
- Sandra Lee Scheuer (Beta Tau) – killed in Kent State shootings
