= Natori =

Natori may refer to:

== Places ==
- Natori, Miyagi, a city in northern Japan
- Natori River, a river in northern Japan
- Natori District, Miyagi, a former district in Miyagi Prefecture, Japan
- Natori Station, an East Japan Railway Company station

== People with the surname ==
- Atsushi Natori, Japanese soccer player
- Eri Natori (名取 英理; born 1985), Japanese speed skater
- Josie Natori, fashion designer
- Kaori Natori, Japanese singer and model
- Takeshi Natori, Japanese soccer player
- Natori Masatake, samurai
- Natori (musician) (なとり), Japanese singer-songwriter

== Other ==
- Japanese cruiser Natori, a light cruiser of the Imperial Japan Navy
- The Natori Company, a fashion company
