= Karmiraghbyur =

Karmiraghbyur may refer to:

- Nerkin Karmiraghbyur, Armenia
- Verin Karmiraghbyur, Armenia
