= Mary Ryan =

Mary Ryan may refer to:

== Actresses ==
- Mary Ryan (actress) (1885–1948), American stage and screen actress
- Mary Nash (actress) (1884–1976), née Ryan, American vaudevillian, later stage/screen actress

== Characters ==
- Mary Ryan a.k.a. Blue Mary, in the Fatal Fury and The King of Fighters computer game series
- Mary Ryan (character), in the American soap opera Ryan's Hope
- Mary Ryan, in the 1999 Canadian film The Divine Ryans

== Sports ==
- Mary Ryan, Dublin camogie player, who played in 1964 All-Ireland Senior Camogie Championship
- Mary Ryan, Galway camogie player, who played in Gael Linn Cup 1981
- Mary Ryan, Tipperary camogie player, who played in 2006 All-Ireland Senior Camogie Championship

== Other notable people ==
- Mary Alma Ryan (1863–1929), American Roman Catholic nun
- Mary Ryan (academic) (1873–1961), first woman professor in Ireland or Great Britain
- Mary Ryan (Irish politician) (1898–1981), Irish Fianna Fáil TD for Tipperary 1944–1961
- Mary A. Ryan (1940–2006), U.S. diplomat
- Mary P. Ryan, American historian
- Mary Ryan (writer), American TV writer/director
- Mary Perkins Ryan (1912–1993), American Catholic author, editor, and educator
- Mary Ryan (materials scientist), professor of materials science
- Mary Kate Ryan (1878–1934), Irish academic and political activist
- Mary Eucharia Ryan (1860–1929), Irish Loreto sister and pioneer of women's higher education
- Mary Ryan, who spotted Momo the Monster

== See also ==
- Mary Ryan, Detective, a 1949 American crime drama
- Marie Ryan (disambiguation)
