= The Prout School =

School in Wakefield, Rhode Island, United States

Location
- 4640 Tower Hill Road; Wakefield, Washington County, Rhode Island 02879-2277; United States; 41°27′2.71″N 71°28′6.75″W

Information
- Type: Private, Coeducational
- Motto: Fluctus justitiae pax (Latin: "Peace will be the fruit of justice - La paix est le fruit de la justice")
- Religious affiliation: Roman Catholic
- Established: 1966
- Founder: Elizabeth Prout (Sisters of the Cross and Passion)
- Chairperson: Richard L. Cote, Sr.
- Head of school: David Estes
- Campus Minister: Lily A. Araujo
- Chaplain: Ryan Simas
- Faculty: 31
- Grades: 9–12
- Enrollment: 400 (2020)
- Campus size: 212 acres (0.86 km^{2})
- Campus type: Rural
- Colors: Maroon and White
- Mascot: Crusader
- Team name: Crusaders
- Accreditation: New England Association of Schools and Colleges, International Baccalaureate
- Newspaper: The Crusader Chronicle (defunct)
- Yearbook: Columba
- Endowment: $55.15 million (as of 2011)
- Tuition: $16,500
- Dean of Students: Andrea Spazziante
- Admissions Director: Sharon DeLuca
- Athletic Directors: Duane Miranda, Kelly Moniz
- Website: www.theproutschool.org

The Prout School is a private, coeducational, college-preparatory high school located in Wakefield, Rhode Island. It is a member of the New England Association of Schools and Colleges (NEASC) and is an International Baccalaureate school. It services all of New England, but more specifically Rhode Island and Connecticut.

== History ==
Located in the Roman Catholic Diocese of Providence, The Prout School was founded in 1966 by the Sisters of the Cross and Passion of Manchester, England and named after Mother Mary Joseph Prout, the order's founder. The school was originally an all female institution called Prout Memorial High School. The campus was built on a 212-acre (0.86 km^{2}) property adjacent to nearby Wakefield (South Kingstown). In 1981, the school became a diocesan high school, and in 1986 it became a co-educational institution and was renamed The Prout School. In 1992, following the 25th anniversary of the school, Prout became the third United States school to become a member of the International Baccalaureate Organization.

== Extracurricular activities ==
Prout has a very large active arts program, including theatre, music, visual arts, and dance. The theatre department puts on a play in the winter and a musical in the fall and spring. The dance, music, and visual arts departments have a joint program every December and June.

In addition to the arts programs, the school also offers many clubs and non-athletic teams including Mock Trial, Robotics, and Math Team. The school's chapter of the Rhode Island Model Legislature has been highly successful in recent years. In the 2020–2021 school year (the Seventy-Fourth Rhode Island Model Legislature), the club enjoyed its most successful year, with Michael J. Garman, the leader of the Liberal Party, serving as President of the Senate and Ruth Axford as Senate Conservative Leader.

Fall sports	Cross country, soccer, girls' volleyball, girls' tennis, football (co-op)
Winter sports	Swim, indoor track, basketball, girls' hockey (co-op) boys' hockey
Spring sports	Baseball, softball, lacrosse, outdoor track, boys' tennis, sailing, golf

== Notable alumni ==
- Carolyn Rafaelian, founder of Alex and Ani
- Mason Feole, professional baseball player (2019–present)

== See also ==
- Catholic schools in the United States
- Higher education
- List of Rhode Island schools
- Parochial school
