= Belcourt of Newport =

Mansion in Newport, Rhode Island

Belcourt
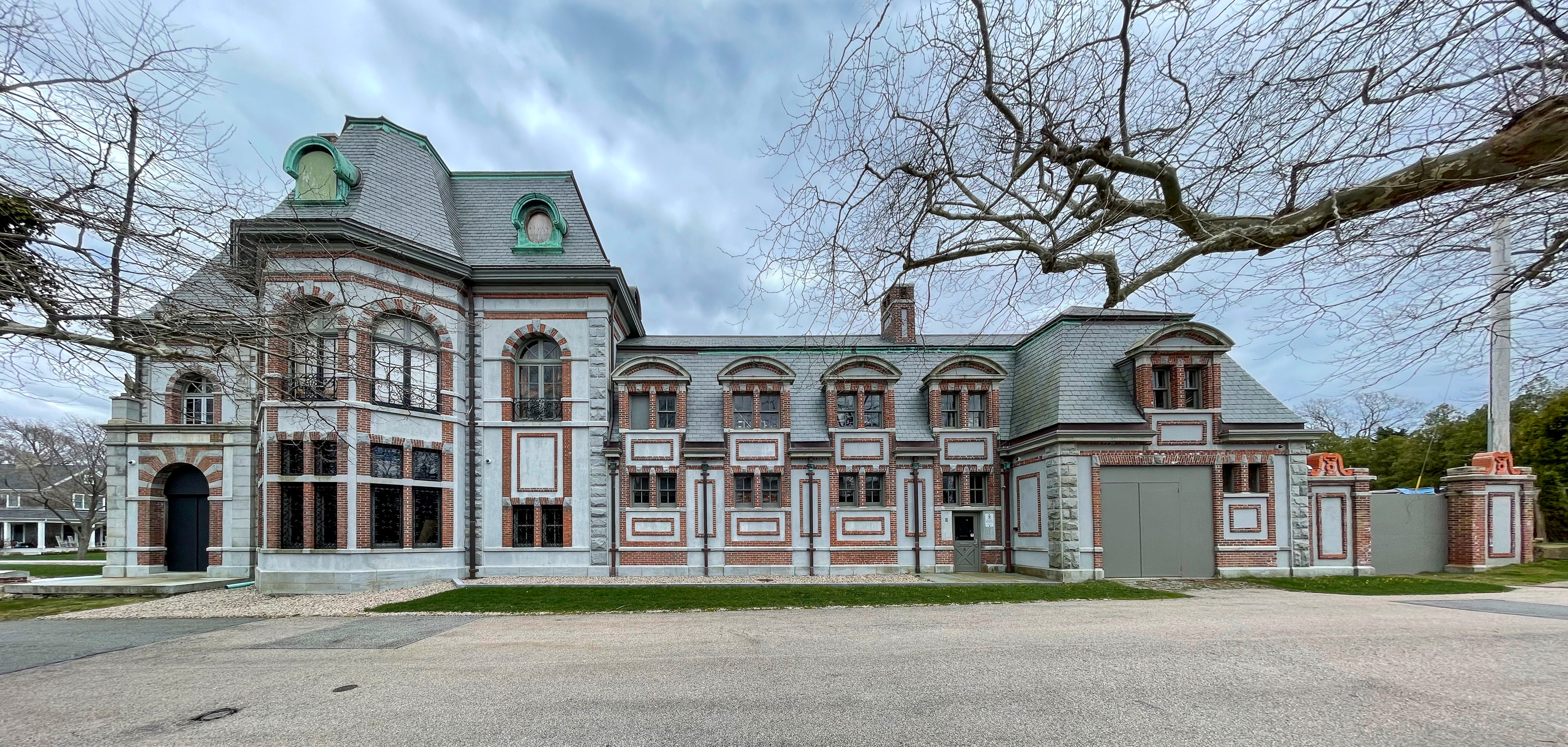
- Ledge Road (west) façade
- Former names: Belcourt Castle

General information
- Type: Residence
- Architectural style: Châteauesque
- Location: Newport, Rhode Island, US, 657 Bellevue Avenue
- Coordinates: 41.45750°N 71.30627°W
- Construction started: 1891
- Completed: 1894
- Inaugurated: Tuesday, September 2, 1895
- Renovated: 1896–1907, 1910–1914
- Cost: $3.2 million ($80 million in 2011)
- Client: Oliver Belmont; Alva Belmont
- Owner: Carolyn Rafaelian

Technical details
- Structural system: Load-bearing masonry walls, steel I-beams and heavy timbers
- Floor count: 3
- Floor area: 50,000 ft^{2} (4,600 m^{2})

Design and construction
- Architect: Richard Morris Hunt
- Main contractor: George A. Fuller Construction Company

Renovating team
- Architects: John Russell Pope, Horace Trumbauer

Belcourt is a former summer cottage designed by architect Richard Morris Hunt for Oliver Hazard Perry Belmont and located on Bellevue Avenue in Newport, Rhode Island, United States.

Construction began in 1891 and completed in 1894, and it was intended to be used for only six to eight weeks of the year. Belcourt was designed in a multitude of European styles and periods; it features a heavy emphasis on French Renaissance and Gothic decor, with further borrowings from German, English, and Italian design. In the Gilded Age, the castle was noted for its extensive stables and carriage areas, which were incorporated into the main structure.

== Construction ==
Belcourt Castle

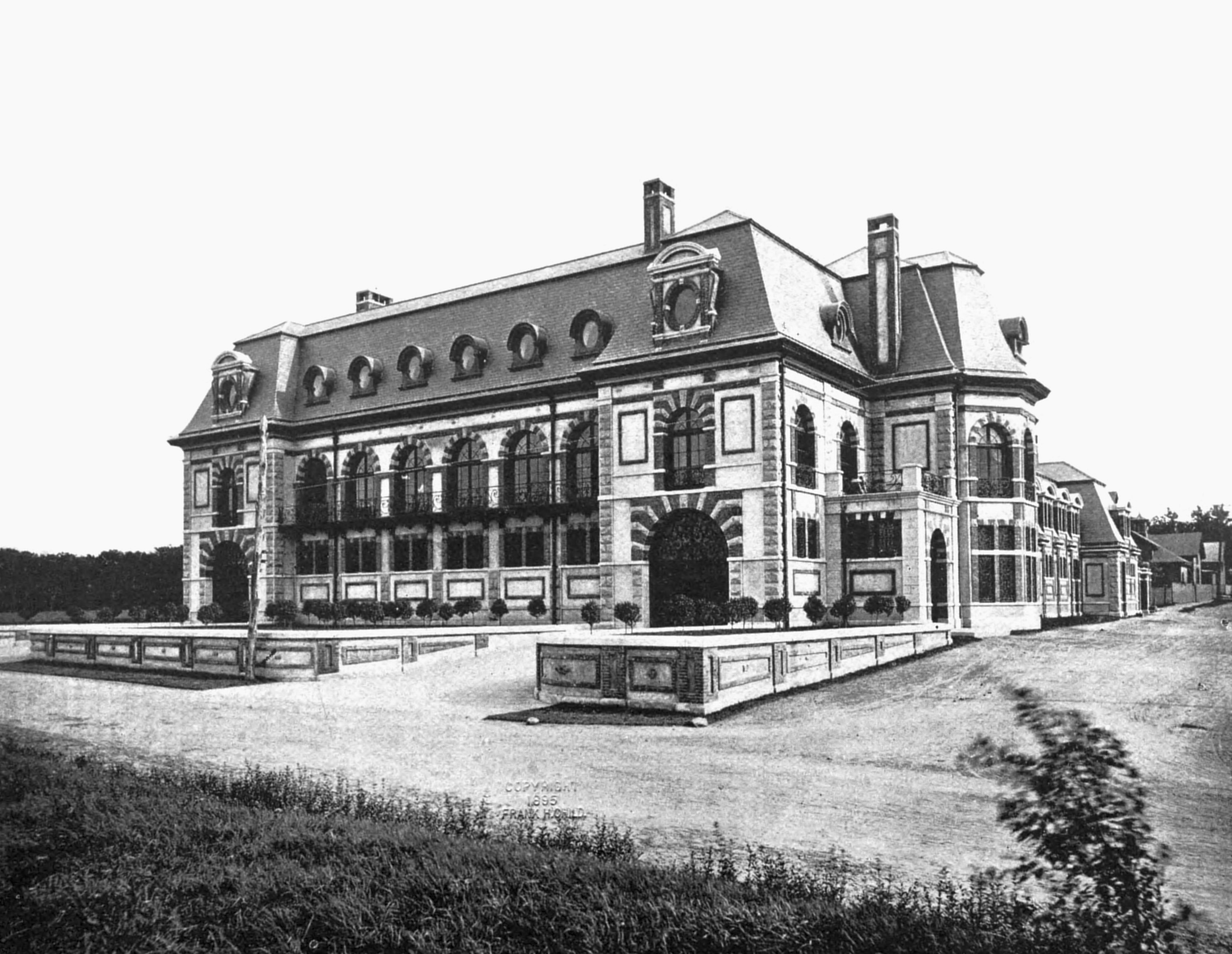
1895, shortly after completion

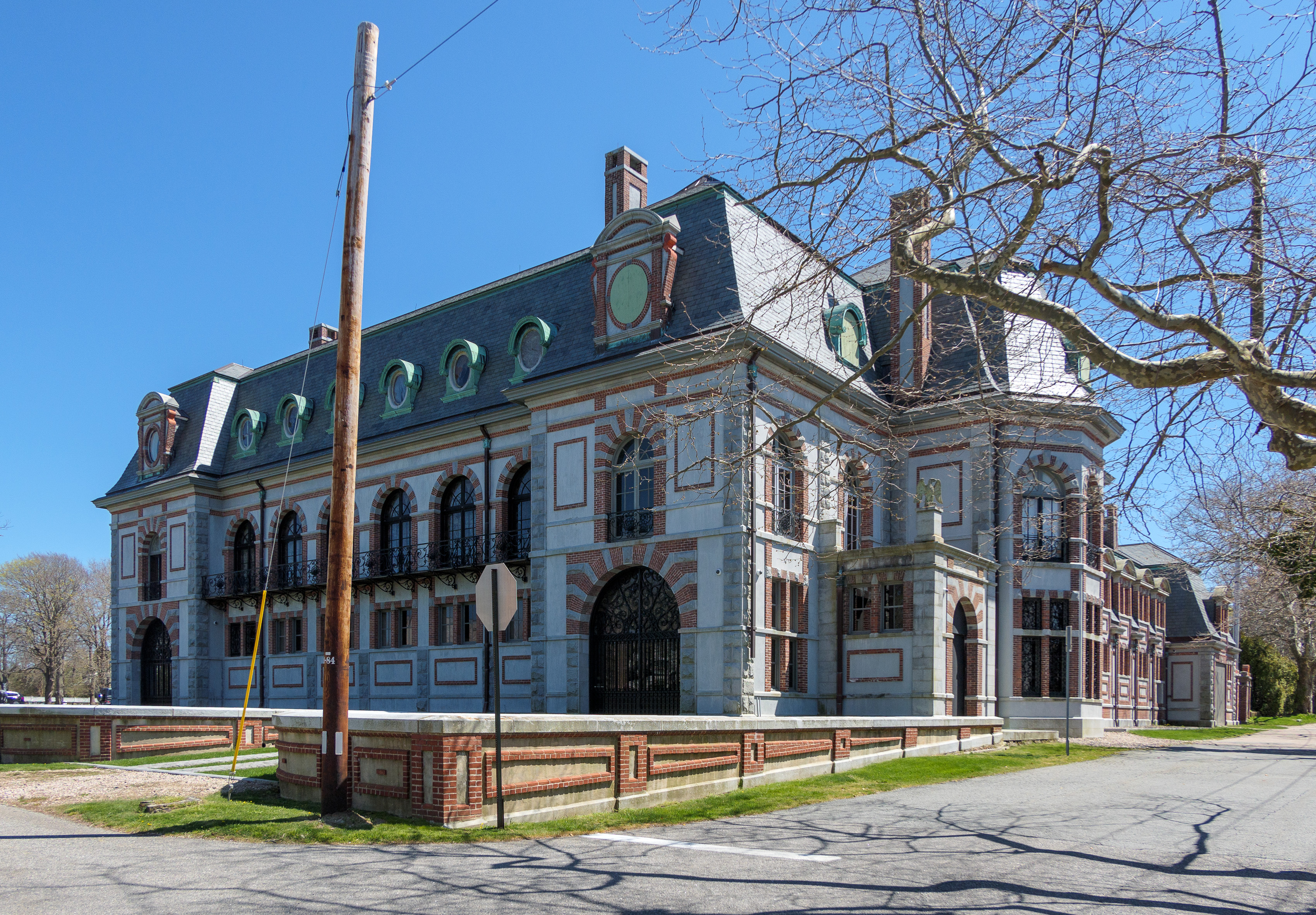
2022

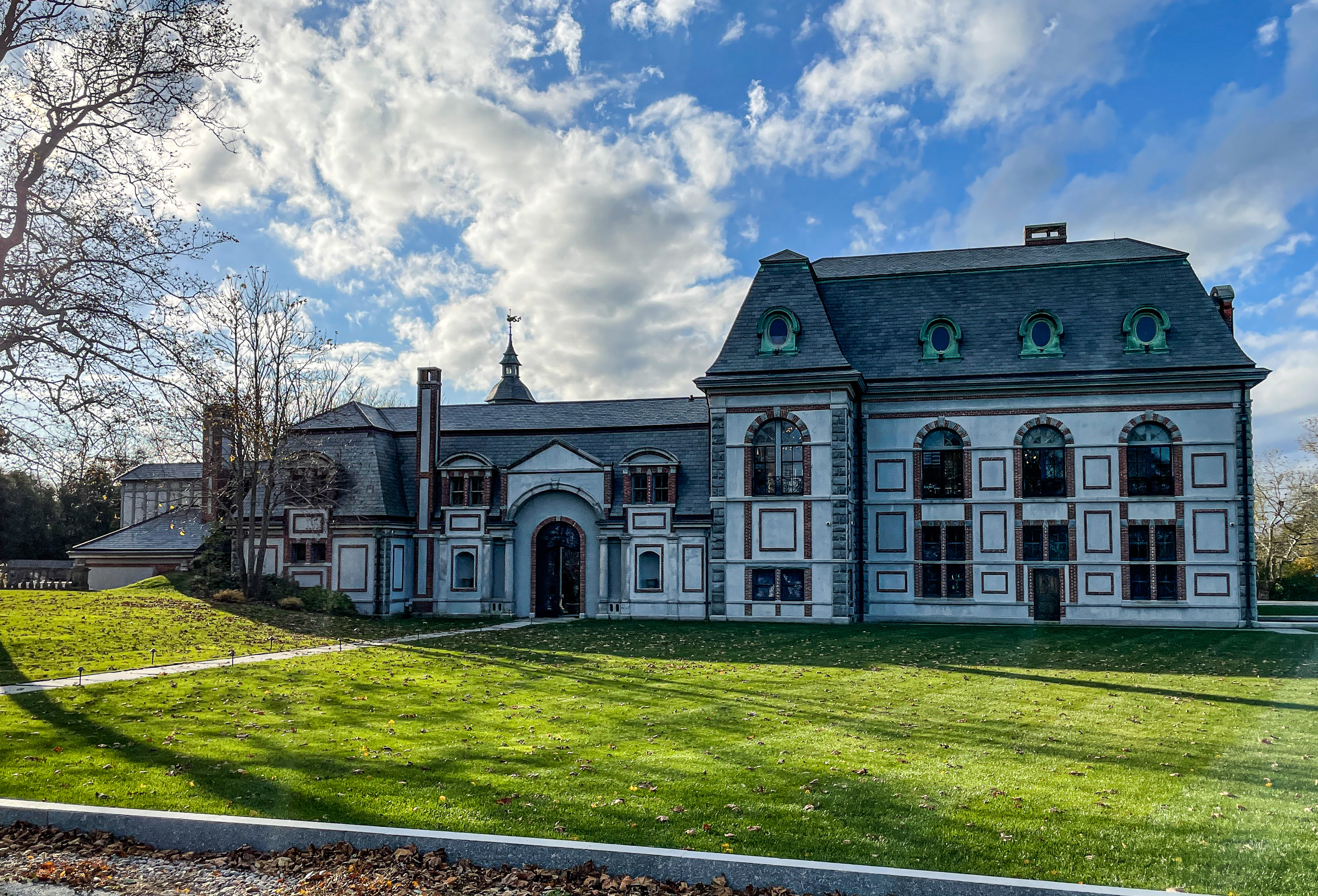
Rear of the mansion (east façade) faces Bellevue Avenue

Belcourt is located on Bellevue Avenue at Lakeview Avenue, in Newport. A 50,000-square-foot (4,600 m^{2}), 60-room summer villa, it was designed by Richard Morris Hunt for 33-year-old Oliver Belmont, who during the construction was divorced from Sara Swan Whiting and the father of a daughter, Natica, for whom he denied paternity. It was based on the Louis XIII style hunting lodge at Versailles, and incorporated Oliver's love of pageantry, history and horses in its magnificent interior halls, salons and ballrooms. The Belmont Stakes was named for his father, August Belmont Sr., and Oliver was known for his skill as a four-in-hand carriage driver. Belmont wanted Belcourt designed precisely to his specifications. Hunt was hesitant, but concentrated on his guiding principle that it was his client's money he was spending. Construction cost $3.2 million in 1894, a figure of approximately $80 million in 2011 dollars. Belmont employed some thirty servants at Belcourt, with aggregate wages of approximately $100 per week, or approximately 40% of the national average wage at the time.

== Belmont years ==
When construction finished in 1894, the entire first floor was composed of carriage space and a multitude of stables for Belmont's prized horses. Upstairs was a master bedroom with wall scenes depicting the life of a nobleman and a bathroom with Newport's first standing shower. Scheduled to open for July 4 of that year, Belcourt would remain closed for the summer season while Belmont was hospitalized in New York City, the victim of a mugging. It would be a full year until Belmont saw his completed mansion.

The building was formed of a large quadrangle, with two-story wings connecting to a three-story main block (the north wing). The effect can be viewed today in the form of a large, 80-by-40-foot (24-by-12m) central courtyard with half timbers in the Norman style. The immense mansard roof is pierced by oval copper dormers and chimneys finished in the same manner as the walls. The symmetrical north façade is where the carriage entrances were located. A narrow wrought-iron balcony stretches 70 feet (20 m) on the second floor.

Belmont had disdain for the nouveau riche who, in splashy displays of wealth, built ostentatious mansions between Bellevue Avenue and the Atlantic coast. As a result, guests entered Belcourt through an entrance just off of Ledge Road, a short road that runs parallel to Bellevue Avenue.

Inside the castle was just as magnificent and somewhat eccentric. Belmont housed his vast collection of horses and carriages on the ground floor, accessed by two huge carriage entrances on either side of the north façade. To the west of this vast area was Belmont's Francis I Renaissance-style Grand Hall and foyer, which exited onto Ledge Road. The monumental Gothic rooms with their huge stained-glass windows were emblazoned with the Belmont coat of arms. The room's original damask, blood red in color, has long since been replaced with the same fabric in gold.

The Grand Staircase, now a replica of the stairs in the Cluny Museum in France, connects the Lower Grand Hall to Belmont's Upper Grand Hall on the second floor. The details are mostly the same as those of its partner room below. Myriad formal rooms open onto one another in varying periods of French style and decoration. The galleries and halls of the second floor employ the architect's trademark of vistas framing the views into various rooms.

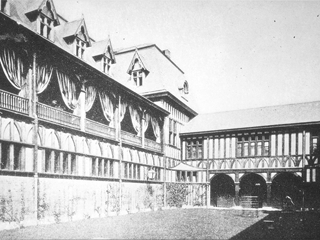
The courtyard before Alva Belmont initiated renovations that would radically reconfigure the courtyard and the interior of the home

Belmont married his neighbor Alva Vanderbilt, the former wife of William Kissam Vanderbilt, on January 11, 1896. Eager to reshape and redesign Belcourt, Alva made changes that morphed the already eccentric character of Belcourt into a yet more eccentric hybrid mixture of styles. Alva Belmont converted the carriage room into a banquet hall and transformed a study into a boudoir, importing 18th-century French paneling. In 1899, Belcourt was the host of the nation's first automobile parade.

== Changes in ownership ==
Oliver Belmont died in 1908 and Mrs. Belmont died in France on January 26, 1933. Belcourt passed to 80-year-old Perry Belmont, the eldest Belmont child and Alva's brother-in-law. At the onset of World War II, Perry Belmont had most of the contents of Belcourt moved to his other estates as Newport was a naval base and potentially at risk of attack. Select pieces of Alva's were auctioned off, as Perry allegedly had no great love for her.

In 1940, Belmont decided to rid himself of Belcourt. Negotiations commenced with George Waterman, an entrepreneur. Waterman envisioned Belcourt as an antique auto museum. The only conditions of the sale were that Waterman had to restore the castle as close as possible to Hunt's original plans. Waterman was responsible for the restoration of the third-floor roof and removal of an addition overlooking the courtyard. After paying $1,000 for the castle, Waterman was informed that zoning wouldn't allow his antique auto museum.

In 1943, Waterman sold Belcourt to Edward Dunn, who never lived at Belcourt during the eleven years that he owned it (up until 1954). During the war years when many of the grand mansions were being razed or converted into various institutions, Dunn rented the stables of the rundown castle to the military to use for repairing equipment.

Dunn sold Belcourt to Louis and Elaine Lorillard in 1954 for $22,500. The Lorillards, of tobacco fame, envisioned Belcourt as a seat for the Newport Jazz Festival. The lawns on Bellevue Avenue could accommodate over 10,000 and the masonry and stucco façade provided an acoustic background. The large central courtyard was the scene for concerts, with the open loggia providing further room for spectators. Inside, the massive rooms were used for workshops and lodging. However, the future for Belcourt as a permanent venue for the festival was dim due to protests from the neighbors.

Belcourt had deteriorated, largely uninhabited for over two decades. In November 1956, the Lorillards sold the rundown, mostly abandoned castle to the Tinney Family.

=== The Tinneys ===
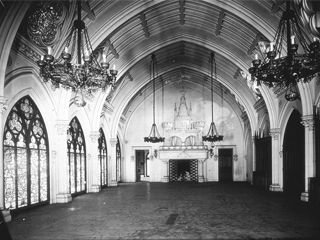
The Tinney Family bought Belcourt in 1956 and were faced with restoring rooms such as the French gothic ballroom, shown prior to furnishing and restorative work

The Tinney Family, of Cumberland, Rhode Island, bought Belcourt in 1956 for $25,000. In addition to changing the name from Belcourt to Belcourt Castle, the Tinneys filled the castle with their own collection of antiques and reproductions. Included are a coronation coach, which son Donald made, and a 1701 copy of a Hyacinthe Rigaud portrait of Louis XIV, which hung in the Green Room in the Palace of the Tuileries. The centerpiece of the Tinney additions was an enormous Imperial Russian-style chandelier, which holds 13,000 rock crystal prisms and 105 lights. The chandelier hangs a few feet above the rose marble mosaic floor of the banquet hall.

At the time that Belcourt was purchased in 1956, the Tinney family comprised Harold Tinney, his wife Ruth Tinney, their son Donald Tinney, and Ruth's aunt Nellie Fuller (a descendant of Mayflower passenger Edward Fuller). In 1960, Donald Tinney married Harle Hanson, who had been at Belcourt to work as a tour guide. Harle Tinney was the only surviving member of the family when Belcourt was sold in 2012.

Other artifacts within Belcourt included an immense collection of Persian rugs, French royal art and furnishings, Oriental art and furnishings, and numerous religious objets d'art.

Changes at Belcourt have been numerous in the years following 1956, when the Tinney family moved in. They raised the ceiling of the Organ Loft 11 feet (3.4 m) to accommodate a 26-rank tracker organ. Between 1966 and 1970, when the coronation coach was being built, an old kitchen area became a coach hall. In 1969, the open loggia became a French salon. In 1975, they transformed the north-west reception room into a chapel with the addition of German Renaissance stained glass. In the early 1980s, the Tinneys built gate piers on Bellevue Avenue and installed gates that they had acquired from the Taylor estate in Portsmouth. The overthrow was altered to make the gates the tallest of any estate entrance in Newport.

In 1983, robbers attempted a million-dollar heist of Belcourt's antiques. Police recovered many artifacts but not a 14-pound silver reliquary containing a relic from the third century.

The lawns contain many sculptural pieces in bronze, terra cotta, marble and stone. Depicting scenes from mythology, nymphs and cherubs, the collection is an informal contrast to the strong and robust lines of the French-style château. The driveways and pathways are lined with lush arborvitae, planted by the Tinneys a few years after they moved into Belcourt.

Belcourt is the third largest mansion in Newport, after The Breakers and Ochre Court. The castle has been the subject of an ongoing restoration project spanning from the beginning of the Tinney family's occupation of the castle up to and including the present day.

On May 26, 2009, it was reported that the then-owner of Belcourt, Harle Tinney, had put the residence up for sale. The home was put on the market for $7.2 million. As of June 2011, the price had been reduced twice to $5.1 million and then to $3.9 million. Subsequently, it was taken off of the market and re-listed for sale in two parcels totaling $4.625 million. Tinney said she was ready to part with the home after her husband's death in 2006.

==== Belcourt as a museum ====
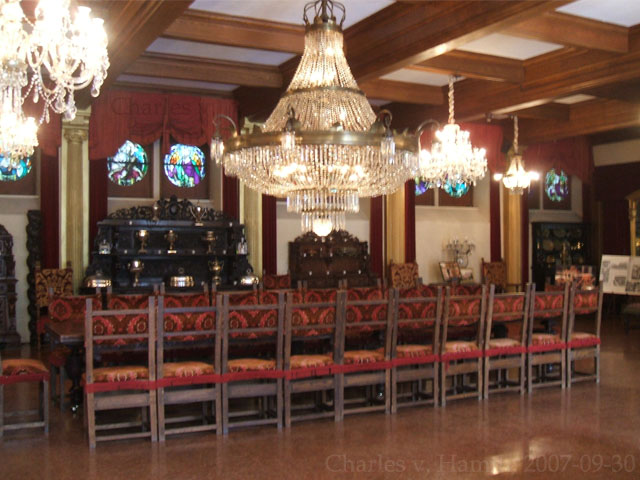
The Banquet Hall features nine crystal chandeliers, the most substantial lit by 105 electric lights

Belcourt was open to the public as a museum of antiquities and architectural and social history. Of the 60 rooms at Belcourt, over a dozen were viewable on tour. A visit to the castle included viewings of an English library (added in 1910 by John Russell Pope; the ceiling is a replica of the one in Haddon Hall's Long Gallery), a banquet hall, a chapel, two of three grand halls, a music room, an Empire-style dining room, a French gothic-style ballroom, two principal bedrooms, a loggia and a gallery. All of the rooms are furnished with pieces from the Tinney family collections. The first tours of Belcourt were given in 1957 and, ever since then, the castle has been a fixture on Bellevue Avenue. The collections included furnishings, art and artifacts from 33 European and Asian countries and 37 other Newport mansions. The Tinney family's enormous collection earned Belcourt a notable status within Newport's thriving tourism industry. Belcourt was also the only mansion in Newport that was both open to the public and had a private owner in residence. Harle Tinney frequently guided tours through her home and was often present to greet visitors when she was in residence.

=== Rafaeilian ===
On November 12, 2012, Belcourt was purchased by Carolyn Rafaelian, owner of the Cranston, Rhode Island–based company Alex and Ani, for $3.6 million. Rafaelian is currently restoring and renovating the mansion, which she reopened in summer 2014 as a tour house, art gallery, and event space under the business name Belcourt of Newport. Rafaelian reports she has already spent $5 million on renovations, including $3 million for a new roof.

== Materials ==
Belcourt's distinctive exterior appearance was achieved through the use of brick and Westerly granite to frame the windows, doors and fields of stucco. The roof is sheathed in Pennsylvania slate and is pierced by numerous ox-eye (elliptical) dormer windows. The interior, completed by 300 imported artisans, was created of carved oak with oak and mosaic marble floors. The numerous decorative ceilings were finished with sculpted and molded plaster and carved woods such as chestnut. The walls are finished with canvas paintings, carved oak, imported paneling and pure silk damasks. The numerous exterior railings and gates are composed of wrought iron and bronze, featuring a shell motif and the monogram "OB." The foundations are stone, brick and poured concrete with thick brick walls supporting enormous roof timbers and steel I-beams.

== See also ==
- Buildings inspired by Versailles
