= Eskandarian =

Eskandarian or Iskenderian is a surname. Notable people with the surname include:

- Alecko Eskandarian (born 1982), Iranian-American football (soccer) player
- Andranik Eskandarian (born 1951), Iranian-American football (soccer) player
- Ed Iskenderian (1921–2026), American high performance automotive parts manufacturer
- Mary Ellen Iskenderian, president and CEO of Women's World Banking
- Vartkes Iskenderian, founder of Zankou Chicken in California
