= Georgy Tishchenko =

Russian businessman

Georgy (Yuri) Makarovich Tishchenko (Russian: Юрий Макарович Тищенко; 1856–1922) was a Russian businessman who was involved in the populist Zemlya i Volya (Land and Liberty) and Black Repartition movements.

He participated in the Rostov-Kharkiv circle before joining the revived Zemlya i Volya of 1876. He was chair of the Voronezh Congress in June 1879. Failing to find a compromise at this Congress, Zemlya i Volya split in two: Tishchenko joined the Black Partition.

In 1887 Tishchenko moved first to Tiflis and then Baku. At the latter he found employment in the offices of the Council of the Congress of Oil Industrialists. Following the development of a friendship with Pavel Gusakov he was appointed secretary of that organisation. By 1900 he became head of the Caspian Oil Industrial Association.

In 1907 he participated with Simeon Aisenstein in the foundation of the "Society of Wireless Telegraphy and Telephones of the S. Eisenstein System".

By 1914 he was involved in the management of 22 joint-stock companies and was partner of P. O. Gukasov and Co.
