= Marie Ryan =

Marie Ryan may refer to:

- Marie Ryan, player in 1978 All-Ireland Senior Camogie Championship
- Marie-Laure Ryan, writer

== See also ==
- Mary Ryan (disambiguation)
