= Esther Afua Ocloo =

Ghanaian entrepreneur (1919–2002)

- Born: Esther Afua Nkulenu; 18 April 1919; Peki Dzake, British Togoland
- Died: 8 February 2002 (aged 82); Accra, Ghana
- Known for: Pioneer of microlending and campaigner for economic empowerment of women
- Spouse: Stephen Ocloo
- Children: 4

Esther Afua Ocloo (born Esther Afua Nkulenu; 18 April 1919 – 8 February 2002) was a Ghanaian businesswoman and pioneer of microlending, a programme of making small loans in order to stimulate businesses.

She was a co-founder of Women's World Banking in 1976, with Michaela Walsh and Ela Bhatt. Ocloo served as its first chair of trustees. She received the 1990 African Prize for Leadership and numerous other honours for her work on behalf of economic empowerment of women and families. She was a member of Unity Worldwide Ministries.

== Early life and education ==
Esther Afua Nkulenu was born in the Volta Region of Ghana (then British Togoland) to George Nkulenu, a blacksmith, and his wife Georgina, a potter and farmer, both of the Ewe people. Sent by her grandmother to a Presbyterian primary school, the girl advanced to a coeducational boarding school at Peki Blengo. Because of poverty, she travelled weekly from home to the school, taking food supplies each week which she cooked for herself to avoid expenses. When she won a scholarship to Achimota School, her aunt provided her with money to travel to the school. She studied there from 1936 to 1941, when she obtained the Cambridge School Certificate.

In 1943 Nkulenu, using a small financial gift from her aunt and skills acquired at Achimota, began selling marmalade in Accra. Deciding to pursue further work in the food industry, she secured a contract from Achimota to supply the school with orange juice made from oranges grown on its campus. She then won an additional contract to provide the Royal West African Frontier Force with juice. Lacking the resources on her own to fulfill the obligations, she took out a loan from a bank and established Nkulenu Industries, the first food processing factory in the Gold Coast.

After getting her business established, she was sponsored by Achimota College to visit and study in England from 1949 to 1951. She was the first person of African ancestry to obtain a cooking diploma from the Good Housekeeping Institute in London and to take the post-graduate Food Preservation Course at Long Ashton Research Station, Department of Horticulture, Bristol University.

== Business activity ==
Ocloo worked at expanding her business. She travelled to England in 1956 to develop recipes for commercial canning. To overcome prejudice in Ghana against locally produced goods, she formed a manufacturers' association and helped organise the first "Made-in-Ghana" goods exhibition in 1958. Encouraged by President Kwame Nkrumah, she was elected as the first President of what became the Federation of Ghana Industries, serving from 1959 to 1961. In 1964 Ocloo was the first Ghanaian woman to be appointed as Executive Chairman of the National Food and Nutrition Board of Ghana. In the mid-1960s she expanded her activities into the tie and dye textile business.Esther owned a food processing company that produced a lot of processed foods such as Nkulenu Palmnut Soup.She was also one of the women pioneers who lent money to other women to support their small businesses.

From the 1970s onward, she worked at a national and international level in the economic empowerment of women. She was appointed as an adviser to the Council of Women and Development from 1976 to 1986, a member of Ghana's national Economic Advisory Committee from 1978 to 1979, and a member of the Council of State in the Third Republic of Ghana from 1979 to 1981. She was an adviser to the First World Conference on Women in Mexico in 1975.

Following that, she promoted the availability of credit to women, with small loans known as micro-credit, to stimulate their ability to found businesses. Making such loans to women was found to strengthen their ability to provide economically for their children and develop their families. Ocloo was a founding member and the first chairman of the Board of Directors of Women's World Banking from 1979 to 1985.

== Religious activities ==
Ocloo was a founding member of religious groups such as the Evangelical Presbyterian (E.P.) Church in Madina (a suburb of Accra) and the Unity Group of Practical Christianity (Ghana) associated with Unity Worldwide Ministries. She also assisted in forming a women’s group, known as Bible Class, in the E.P. Church, with the aim of studying the Bible and home management. She served on the synod committee of the E.P. Church for 12 years.

== Family ==
She married Stephen Ocloo and they had four children together: daughter Vincentia Canacoo, and three sons, Vincent Malm, Christian Biassey and Steven Ocloo Jr.

== Death ==
Esther Afua Ocloo died in Accra, Ghana, aged 82, from pneumonia, on 8th February 2002 at the 37 military hospital. She received a state funeral in Accra, and was buried at her hometown, Peki Dzake.

== See also ==
- Patience Akyianu

== Honours ==
- Honoured by Evangelical Presbyterian Church, Ghana for meritorious Service to Church –1982.
- Honoured by all women association of Ghana (AWAG) for meritous service (1985).
- Recognized and certified by the editorials board of Biographical publication, England, as one of the Foremost Women of the Twentieth Century.
- As co-winner with Olusegun Obasanjo of the African leadership prize for sustainable end of hunger by the Hunger Project, New York, 1990, she was the first African woman to be awarded this prize.
- Honoured by International Federation of Business and Professional Women –1991
- National Arts and Culture Award (by Ghana National Commission On Culture, 1992).
- The first woman laureate of the Gottlieb Duttweiler Prize, Switzerland, 1993.
- Honoured by Junior Achievement (Global Leadership Award, 1995)
- Honoured at First Global Women Investment Exhibition, by Ghana Association of Women Entrepreneurs (GAWE)–July 1996.
- Honoured by Peki Union for contribution and dedication to the welfare of her hometown Peki, Ghana.
- Honoured by Women World Banking Ghana in May 1995.
- Honoured by Women World Banking International in Beijing, September 1995. Honoured by Beijing Women of Rochester, New York ASA as one of '100 Heroines for Cause of Women in the 20th Century,' October 1998.
- Ghana’s Millennium Excellence Awards for Women and Gender Balance Development- 1999.
- Honoured with a Google Doodle on 18 April 2017.

== Works cited ==
- Akyeampong, Emmanuel Kwaku; Gates, Henry Louis, eds. (2012). Dictionary of African Biography. Vol. 4. Oxford University Press USA. ISBN 9780195382075.
