= Nancy Barry =

American businesswoman

Nancy M. Barry
- Citizenship: American
- Education: MBA
- Alma mater: Stanford University & Harvard University

Nancy M. Barry is the president of Enterprise Solutions to Poverty, which she founded in September 2006. The organization works with corporations, entrepreneurs, and business schools to build business models that engage low-income producers as suppliers, distributors and consumers of products that build income and assets. She was President of Women's World Banking from 1990 to 2006, expanding the organization's network to reach approximately 20 million low-income entrepreneurs and shaping microfinance worldwide. From 1975 to 1990, Barry worked at the World Bank, pioneering small enterprise programs and leading work on industry, trade and finance.

== Education ==
Barry earned a B.A. in economics at Stanford University, in 1971, and an MBA at Harvard Business School, in 1975.

== Honors and awards ==
Barry is the recipient of a number of awards and honors. She was named to Forbes Magazine's "100 Most Powerful Women in the World" in 2004 and 2005, and was among the 20 people named to the listing of "America's Best Leaders" by U.S. News & World Report in 2006. Likewise, she also received an Alumni Achievement Award from the Harvard Business School, in 2005, and the Award for Distinguished Leadership from the Kellogg School of Management at Northwestern University, in 2004.
