= GeekBrains =

Russian educational platform

- Company type: Limited liability company
- Available in: Russian
- Founded: 2010; 16 years ago
- Headquarters: Moscow, Russia
- Area served: Worldwide
- Key people: Alexander Volchek (CEO)
- Industry: Education and technology
- Products: Educational platform
- Services: Education
- Revenue: ▲$44 mln (2021)
- Employees: ▲568 (2021)
- Parent: VK
- Website: https://gb.ru
- Current status: Active

GeekBrains is a Russian online education company founded in 2010. It operates an educational platform offering courses in information technology, programming, analytics, software testing, marketing, management, and design, taught by industry professionals. Since 2016, it has been part of VK (formerly Mail.ru Group). In 2025, GeekBrains was among the five largest online education providers in Russia.

== History ==
In 2010, Alexander Nikitin and Hayk Hayrapetyan launched the School of Programming project, which later served as the foundation for the GeekBrains educational internet platform, established in 2014. In 2016, GeekBrains LLC was officially registered as a legal entity. That same year, Mail.ru Group acquired a 51% controlling stake in the company. At the time, GeekBrains had an estimated monthly audience of 500,000 users.

In 2019, GeekBrains reported a profit exceeding 300 million rubles. In 2020, Mail.ru Group purchased the remaining 49% of the shares, becoming the sole owner of the company. During the first half of 2020, demand for education on the platform increased approximately fivefold compared to the same period in 2019. In a 2018 ranking of leading Russian online education companies, GeekBrains placed 9th. In 2019, it rose to 5th place. By 2020, it ranked 4th according to Smart Ranking. That year, the combined revenue of GeekBrains and Skillbox reached 6.1 billion rubles, three times higher than in 2019.

In the first quarter of 2021, GeekBrains’ revenue rose by 207% compared to the same period in 2019, reaching 768 million rubles. Based on this figure, the project ranked 4th among Russian educational platforms.

On June 4, 2021, GeekBrains and the Republic of Tatarstan signed an agreement on the development of information and communication technologies in the region, as part of the SPIEF. The Prime Minister of Tatarstan, Aleksey Pesoshin, signed the cooperation agreement with GeekBrains CEO Alexander Volchek.

In August 2021, Mail.ru Group announced the formation of an educational holding, Skillbox Holding, based on its assets Skillbox and GeekBrains. The consolidated revenue of the two platforms for the first half of 2021 amounted to 4.3 billion rubles, compared to 1.9 billion for the same period in 2020.

GeekBrains also participates in the Digital Professions program. In 2022, 75,000 individuals were expected to receive continuing education through the initiative, which is open to all residents of Russia.

== Training programs ==
GeekBrains has a Russian government license for educational activities. GeekBrains online platform hosts training programs, courses and webinars in information technology, programming, analytics, marketing, management, and design. The company offers assistance with internships and employment to its graduates. The average age of the online platform users is 20–35 years old.

As of August 2021, the GeekBrains platform offers over 150 training programs.
