= Artsvanik =

Village in Syunik Province, Armenia

Artsvanik Արծվանիկ
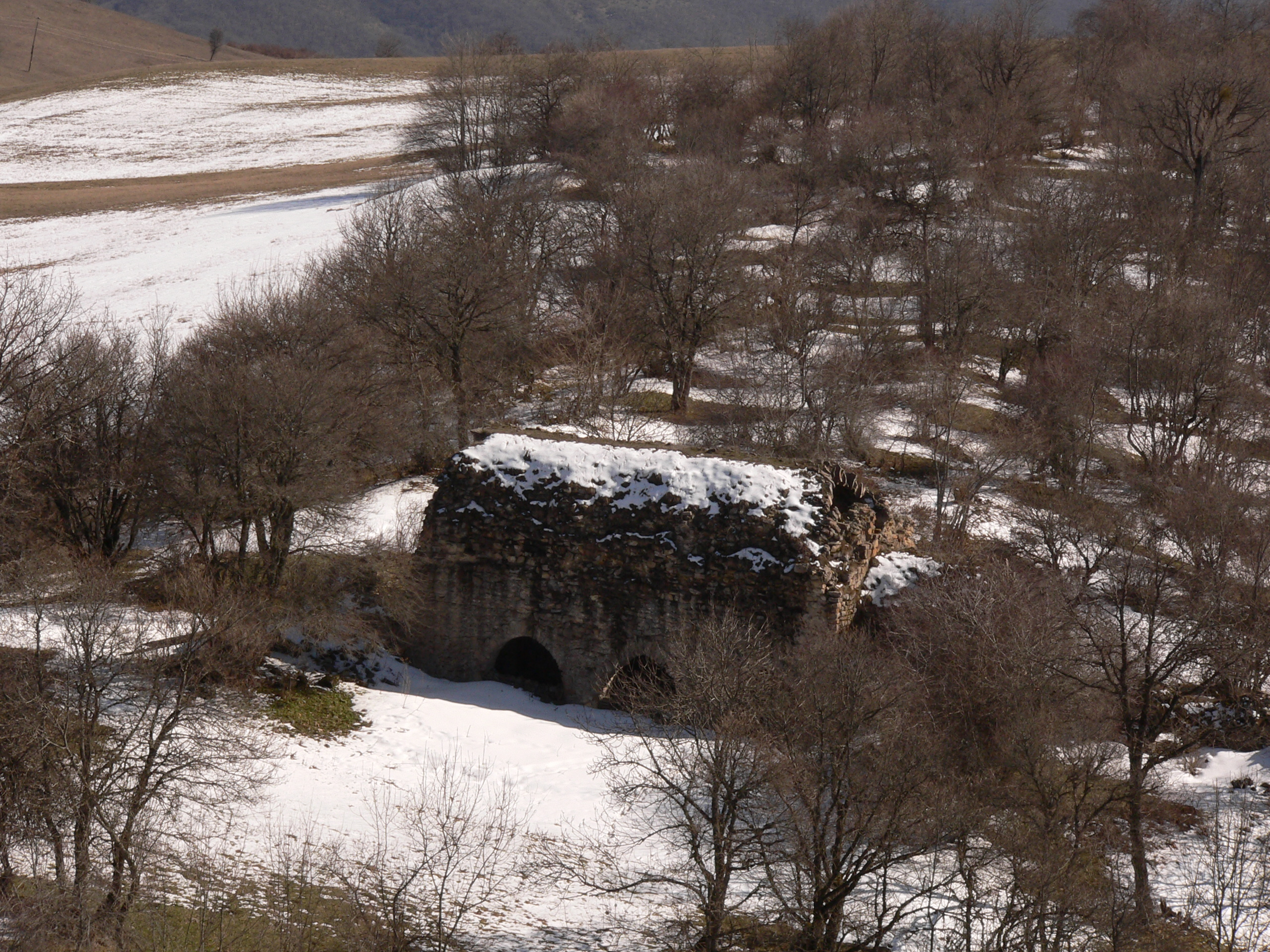
- 6th-century monastery of Yeritsavank in Artsvanik

- Location within Armenia Location within Syunik Province
- Coordinates: 39°15′42″N 46°28′25″E
- Country: Armenia
- Province: Syunik
- Municipality: Kapan

Area
  - Total: 20.02 km^{2} (7.73 sq mi)

Population (2011)
  - Total: 625
  - Density: 31.2/km^{2} (80.9/sq mi)
- Time zone: UTC+4 (AMT)

Artsvanik (Armenian: Արծվանիկ) is a village in the Kapan Municipality of the Syunik Province in Armenia.

== Etymology ==
The village has previously been known as Yeritsvanik, Yeritsvank’, Yertsu Vank’, Karmir Vank’, Yerets’, Yerets and Yeretsvanik.

== Demographics ==
In 1908, Artsvanik (Russian: Арцеваник) had a predominantly Armenian population of 952 within the Zangezur Uyezd of the Elisabethpol Governorate of the Russian Empire.

The Statistical Committee of Armenia reported its population as 578 in 2010, down from 652 at the 2001 census.

== Gallery ==
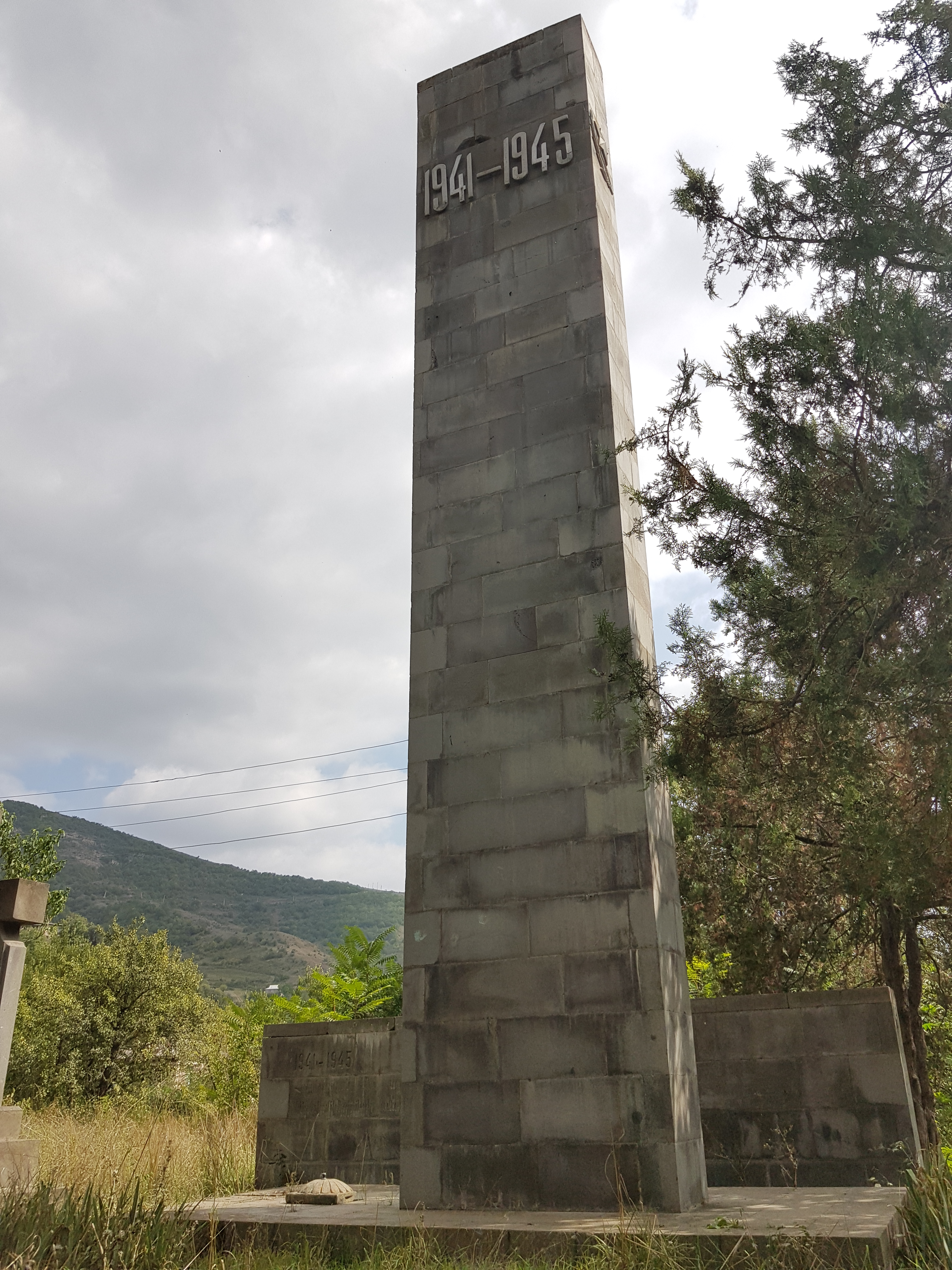
WWII memorial

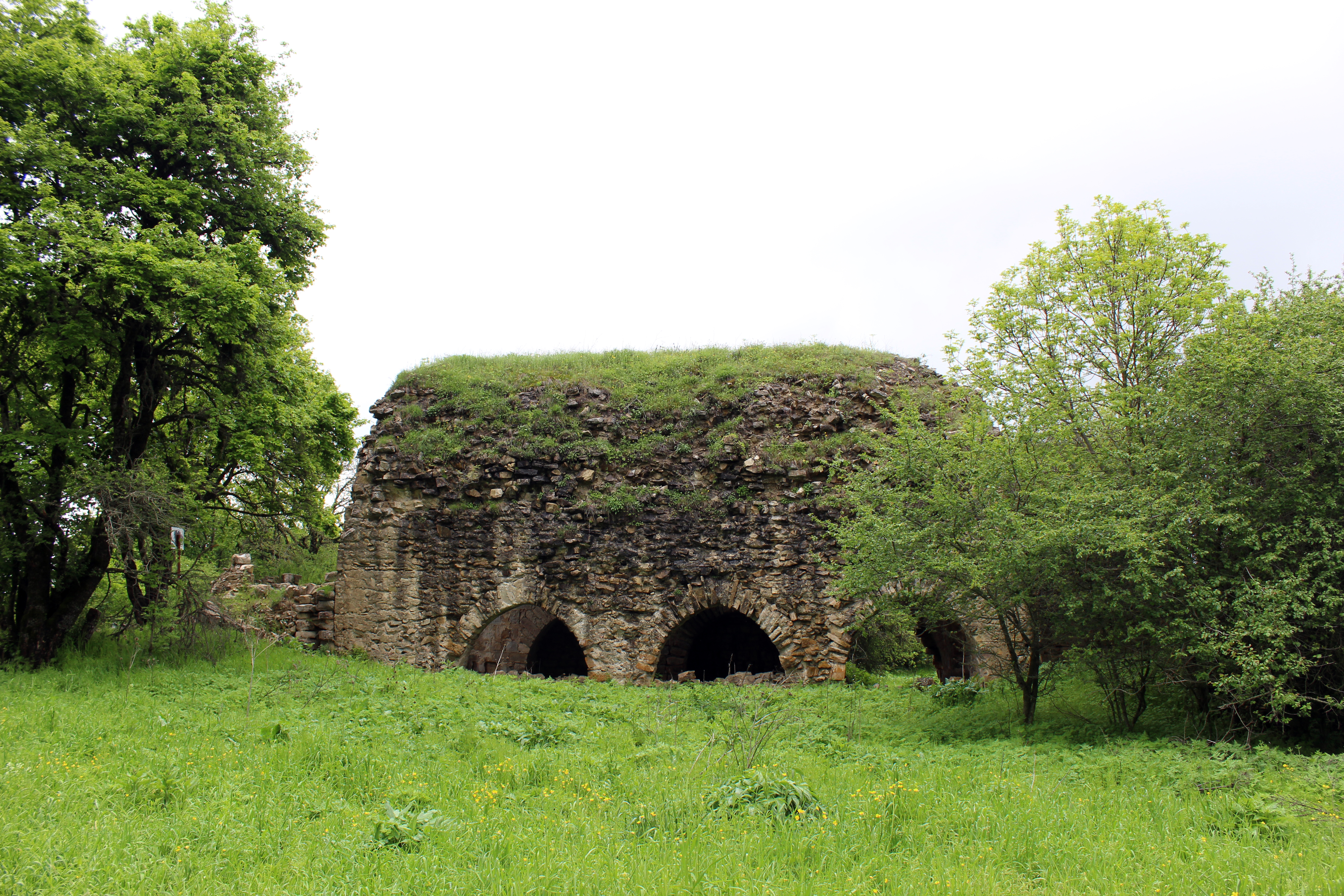
Yeritsavank
