= Marion S. Kellogg =

- Born: June 15, 1920; Rochester, New York
- Died: August 14, 2004 (aged 84)
- Education: Manhattanville College (A.B. 1942); Brown University (M.S. 1944)
- Occupation(s): Management specialist, writer
- Organizations: International Academy of Management; Sigma Xi; New York Academy of Sciences
- Parent(s): Howard S. Kellogg and Helen (Dengler) Kellogg
- Awards: Mary Parker Follett Award

Marion S. Kellogg (June 15, 1920 – August 14, 2004) was a management specialist and author who became the first woman vice president of General Electric (GE).

Born in Rochester, New York, in 1920, she attended Manhattanville College in Purchase, New York, graduating with a Bachelor of Arts degree in 1942, and Brown University in Providence, Rhode Island, receiving a Master of Science degree in 1944.

Kellogg's career with GE began in 1944 at the company's general engineering lab in Schenectady, New York. Over the ensuing years, she held a variety of positions with GE related to engineering, physics, management, and marketing. She was GE's individual development methods manager, based in New York City, from 1958 through 1970, and a marketing development consultant from 1970 through 1974. That year, she became GE vice-president of corporate consulting services in Fairfield, Connecticut, a position she held until 1982, when she became vice-president of corporate information systems. She retired in 1983.

During the late 1970s and early 1980s, Kellogg served on the board of directors of the Emhart Corporation, Cigna, Citytrust Bancorp, and she was a trustee of Manhattanville College, and of Goodwill Industries of Eastern Fairfield County. She held honorary doctorates from Saint Lawrence University, Russell Sage College, Babson College, and Manhattanville College and won a Mary Parker Follett Award for her work, including five published books, on management principles.

Kellogg died in 2004.

== Bibliography ==
- What to Do About Performance Appraisal (1965) OCLC 854903080
- Closing the Performance Gap. Results-Centered Employee Development (1967) OCLC 8971204
- Putting Management Theories to Work (1968) OCLC 249674741
- When Man and Manager Talk: A Casebook (1969) OCLC 299884106
- Career Management (1972) OCLC 1086702182
