= Michaela Walsh (banker) =

Financier and banker

Michaela L. Walsh
- Born: Kansas City, Missouri, U.S.
- Education: Manhattanville College; Kansas City University; Hunter College
- Occupations: financier; banker
- Known for: Founder and first president of Women's World Banking

Michaela L. Walsh is an American financier, banker, founder and first president of Women's World Banking.

== Early life and education ==
Born in Kansas City, Missouri, Walsh attended Manhattanville College for one year before finishing her education at Kansas City University (now UMKC). She attended Hunter College (CUNY), earning a degree in English literature in 1971.

== Career ==
Walsh was one a handful of women working on Wall Street in the 1950s when she became the first female manager to represent Merrill Lynch in its Beirut, Lebanon office in 1960. In 1970, Walsh became the first woman to make partner at the Wall Street brokerage firm Boettcher and Company. In 1972, Walsh joined the Rockefeller Brothers Fund as a program associate, which led to her attending the 1975 World Conference on Women held in Mexico City, where the idea of Women’s World Banking emerged. In 1978, Walsh served as a project director at the US Congressional Office of Technology Assessment where she consulted on appropriate technology. Walsh became a co-founder of Women’s World Banking and its first president, a position she held from 1980 to 1990.
