= Providence Monthly =

US news and lifestyle magazine

- Editor-in-chief: Elyse Major
- Categories: Regional magazine
- Publisher: Providence Media
- Founded: 2000
- Country: United States
- Based in: Providence, Rhode Island
- Language: English
- Website: providenceonline.com

The Providence Monthly is a news and lifestyle magazine covering Providence, Rhode Island, and nearby parts of southeastern Massachusetts.

== History and profile ==
The magazine was launched in 2000. The publisher is Providence Monthly LL.C. The magazine published its 100th issue in 2005. It is freely distributed in the metro Providence market. From June 2020 Providence Monthly merged with its sister magazine East Side Monthly under its title.
