= Krisp =

US-based audio processing company

Krisp Technologies Inc.
- Industry: Audio processing
- Founded: 2017; 9 years ago
- Founders: Davit Baghdasaryan; Artavazd Minasyan
- Headquarters: Berkeley, United States
- Products: Noise suppression software
- Website: krisp.ai

Krisp (or Krisp Technologies Inc.) is an Armenian AI-based audio processing software company that offers real-time noise and voice suppression technology. The company was founded in 2017 in Yerevan, Armenia, by Davit Baghdasaryan and Artavazd Minasyan, and is based in Berkeley, California.

Krisp's main product is a software application that can remove background noises and voices from audio in real-time. The software uses machine learning algorithms to analyze the audio signal and separate the speech from background noise, allowing the speech to be output in clear, noise-free audio. This technology has a wide range of applications, including teleconferencing, remote work, podcasting, and video production.

The software can be used as a standalone application, or it can be integrated into existing audio applications such as Skype, Zoom, and Slack. This allows users to enjoy noise-free audio without having to switch between different applications. Additionally, the software can be trained to recognize specific types of noise, such as traffic noise or dog barking, which makes it more effective in suppressing noise in specific environments.

Krisp was on the list of Forbes’ America's Most Promising Artificial Intelligence Companies of 2020. Additionally, Krisp was on the TIME List of The 100 Best Inventions of 2020. It has also won two Webby Awards.

In April 2020, Discord added noise suppression into its desktop app using the Krisp audio-filtering technology, then shortly after it was added to their mobile app, making Discord one of the first mobile voice chat apps to offer noise suppression.

In 2024, Krisp introduced on-device transcription for calls and meetings, eliminating the need to upload recordings to an external software. The software also integrated ChatGPT, allowing users to request summaries or insights from conversations directly from the transcript. More recently, Krisp extended its product to include an AI note taking system that does not require a bot to independently join a call, as well as a live-speech accent conversion system that can adjust a speaker's accent while preserving their natural tone.
