= Myles Fee =

Canadian ice hockey coach (born 1981)

- Born: January 24, 1981 (age 45) Dauphin, Manitoba, Canada
- Position: Defense
- Playing career: 1998–2006
- Coaching career: 2006–present

Myles Fee (born January 24, 1981) is a Canadian professional ice hockey coach and former defenseman. He is an assistant coach for the Florida Panthers of the National Hockey League (NHL). He previously worked for the New York Rangers, Edmonton Oilers, Charlotte Checkers, and Buffalo Sabres.

Fee was part of Florida’s Stanley Cup championships in 2024 and 2025. Internationally, he coached with Team Europe at the 2016 World Cup of Hockey and was named to the Swedish men’s national team coaching staff for the 2026 Winter Olympics.

== Early life and playing career ==
Fee was born in Dauphin, Manitoba. He played junior hockey for the Dauphin Kings of the Manitoba Junior Hockey League (MJHL) from 1998 to 2002.

He played NCAA Division III hockey for Manhattanville College from 2002 to 2006, earning a bachelor’s degree in management and political science.

== Coaching career ==
=== New York Rangers ===
Fee began working with the New York Rangers during the 2004–05 NHL lockout and later served as a video analyst for the organization.

=== Edmonton Oilers ===
Fee joined the Edmonton Oilers as video coach in 2009 and served for seven seasons.

=== Charlotte Checkers ===
In 2016, Fee became assistant/video coach of the Charlotte Checkers in the American Hockey League. He won the Calder Cup with the team in 2019.

=== Buffalo Sabres ===
Fee served as video coach for the Buffalo Sabres from 2019 to 2022.

=== Florida Panthers ===
Fee joined the Florida Panthers as assistant coach on August 10, 2022. He reached the 2023 Stanley Cup Final.

He then won consecutive Stanley Cup championships with the Panthers in 2024 and 2025. In 2025, he brought the Stanley Cup to Manhattanville University for a public celebration.

== International ==
Fee served as a video coach for Team Europe at the 2016 World Cup of Hockey.

He later worked with the Swedish men’s national team for the 2025 NHL 4 Nations Face-Off and was named to the staff for the 2026 Winter Olympics.

== Personal life ==
Fee is married to Emily (Betts) Fee, also a Manhattanville alum.
