= Giovanni Feroce =

American politician

- Education: University of Rhode Island (B.A.)
- Occupations: Businessman, politician
- Known for: Former CEO of Alex and Ani
- Website: Palm Beach Equity Partners

Giovanni Feroce is an American businessman, investor, U.S. Army combat veteran, and former Rhode Island State Senator. He is best known as the former CEO of lifestyle brand Alex and Ani. He is the founder and CEO of Palm Beach Equity Partners.

== Early life ==
Feroce was born in Lugano, Switzerland, to Italian immigrants Luigi Feroce (from Pignataro Maggiore) and Antonietta Zacchia Feroce (from Pastorano), both in the Province of Caserta in Italy's Campania Region. The family immigrated to the United States, settling in West Warwick, Rhode Island. He attended John F. Horgan Elementary, John F. Deering Middle School, and graduated from West Warwick High School.

He enlisted in the United States Army Reserve after high school and completed basic and advanced infantry training at Fort Benning, Georgia. He earned a B.A. in Political Science from the University of Rhode Island and was commissioned as a U.S. Army officer at age 20, one of the youngest in U.S. history. He was a member of Phi Gamma Delta fraternity.

Feroce later completed the Advanced Management Program at the Wharton School. He also completed the Infantry Officers Basic Course at Fort Benning, GA, and the Civil Affairs Officers Advance Course at The United States Army John F. Kennedy Special Warfare Center and School, Fort Bragg, NC. He holds honorary doctorates from the University of Rhode Island and Rhode Island College.

== Military and public service ==
Feroce served as a field grade U.S. Army officer and is a combat veteran of both Operation Iraqi Freedom and Operation Enduring Freedom. He served as Ground Operations Officer and Interagency Liaison at U.S. Central Command (USCENTCOM).

He was elected to the Rhode Island Senate in 1992 and served as Commissioner of the Rhode Island State Lottery, increasing revenues from $58 million to $456 million.

In 2014, Feroce announced his candidacy for higher office in Rhode Island. As reported by MassLive, he framed his political return around disciplined leadership and economic expansion.

== Business career ==
Feroce joined Alex and Ani as CEO in 2010.

His "Made in America" approach was highlighted in a White House manufacturing initiative in 2011 and received national media attention.

In a 2024 GoLocalProv piece titled "How to Make Decisions: The Cost of Capital", Feroce emphasized the importance of results-based leadership, arguing that executive decisions must always be made with discipline, data, and measurable outcomes in mind.

He also became Chairman and CEO of Benrus, an American watch brand. His efforts were profiled in the New York Times article "A Comeback for the Military Watch."

He is the founder of Palm Beach Equity Partners and owner of the Providence Sky Chiefs, who won the BENRUS Pro Basketball Championship in 2017, the inaugural season title.

He co-authored The Path of Life: Why I Wear My Alex and Ani (2013).

== Public advocacy and philosophy ==
Feroce authored the 2019 open letter "Dear President Paxson: Your Intolerance of Veterans is Unacceptable" in GoLocalProv, advocating for veterans in academia.
