= Nancy Salisbury =

American Catholic nun and academic (1930–2004)

- Born: May 15, 1930
- Died: September 27, 2004 (aged 74); Atherton, California, U.S.

Academic background
- Education: Manhattanville College (BA); University of Detroit (MS)

Academic work
- Discipline: Education

Nancy Salisbury R.S.C.J. (May 15, 1930 – September 27, 2004) was an American Roman Catholic religious sister, educator and academic. Salisbury entered the Religious of the Sacred Heart in 1952 and professed her final vows in 1960.

== Education ==
Salisbury was educated at a Sacred Heart Academy in Overbrook, Philadelphia. She went on to earn a B.A. degree in history from Manhattanville College in 1952 and a M.S. degree in mathematics from the University of Detroit in 1968.

== Career ==
Salisbury was the longtime headmistress of New York's oldest independent school for girls, the Convent of the Sacred Heart. In her two decades as headmistress, starting in 1980, she overhauled the school's curriculum, upgraded its facilities and nearly doubled its enrollment. In 1990, the school received a Blue Ribbon Award for Academic Excellence from the United States Department of Education. She previously taught at Sacred Heart schools in Grosse Pointe, Michigan and Greenwich, Connecticut.

Salisbury was also vice chairwoman of the board of the New York State Association of Independent Schools (NYSAIS) and headed its accreditation commission. After retiring in 2000, she was a mentor to her congregation's novices in Chicago. She sat on the boards of Sacred Heart schools in Albany, Miami, and Greenwich.

== Death ==
She died in Atherton, California, aged 74, from respiratory failure after a kidney infection.
