= Karmir Aghek =

Karmir Aghek Կարմիր Աղեկ
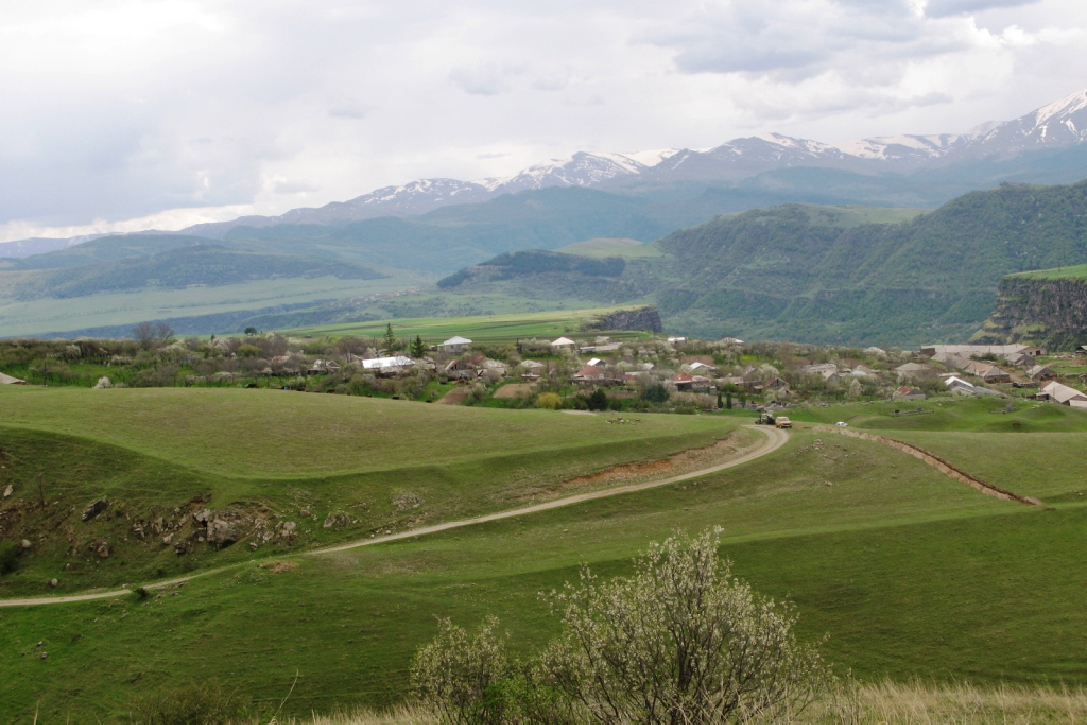

- Location within Armenia
- Coordinates: 40°59′N 44°33′E
- Country: Armenia
- Province: Lori
- Elevation: 1,260 m (4,130 ft)

Population (2011)
  - Total: 174
- Time zone: UTC+4 (AMT)

Karmir Aghek (Armenian: Կարմիր Աղեկ) is a village in the Lori Province of Armenia.
