= Paul Garmirian (cigar brand) =

Paul Garmirian, or P.G. is a cigar brand named after its founder, Armenian-American cigar connoisseur Paul Garmirian. Their cigars are produced in the Dominican Republic.

== History ==
Paul Garmirian founded his company in 1990 after doing extensive research on cigars for his book The Gourmet Guide to Cigars, published the same year. His memoir, The Road to Cigars, was published in 2023.

== Cigar lines ==
- Paul Garmirian 30th Anniversary (Gourmet Series III)
- Paul Garmirian 25th Anniversary
- Paul Garmirian 20th Anniversary
- Paul Garmirian 15th Anniversary
- Paul Garmirian Soiree
- Paul Garmirian Gourmet Series
- Paul Garmirian Gourmet Series II
- Paul Garmirian Maduro
- Paul Garmirian Reserva Exculsiva
- Artisans Selection by Paul Garmirian
- PG Artisan's Passion by Paul Garmirian

== Notable smokers ==
Notable Paul Garmirian cigar smokers include Presidents Bill Clinton, George H. W. Bush, and George W. Bush and other Washington insiders. Law & Order star Fred Thompson, The West Wing actor Richard Schiff, and David Letterman are also known to smoke PG cigars.
