= The Natori Company =

American fashion company

- Company type: Private
- Industry: Fashion and leisure
- Founded: New York, 1977
- Founder: Josie Natori
- Headquarters: New York, United States
- Area served: Worldwide
- Key people: Josie Natori
- Products: lingerie nightwear loungewear ready-to-wear underwear home furnishing perfume
- Divisions: Josie Natori, Natori, Josie, Cruz, Natorious
- Website: www.natori.com

The Natori Company is a women's fashion designer and manufacturer founded by Josie Natori and based in New York City. The company sells lingerie, nightwear, loungewear, ready-to-wear, underwear and other high-end women's fashion to upscale department stores in the US, and to at least 15 countries internationally. In addition to women's clothing, the company is also in the home furnishings industry, and has signed a licensing deal to sell Natori perfume. Natori started a limited men's line in 2006.

== History ==
The company was founded by Josie Natori, a native Filipino. After starting her career on Wall Street at Merrill Lynch, where she rose the ranks to become the first female Vice President in Investment Banking, she decided to pursue a childhood dream of being an entrepreneur. After considering a number of other entrepreneurial ventures from opening a McDonald's franchise, to reproducing antique furniture, she settled on fashion after a buyer at Bloomingdale's suggested she lengthen some peasant blouses sent to her from her native Philippines. The altered garments were sold as nightshirts.

The company celebrated its 30th anniversary in November, 2007, with a dinner that was attended by CEOs and top executives of the company's main vendors, including Saks, Nordstrom, Neiman Marcus, and Bloomingdale's. Natori has expanded its product offerings, and in May 2008, signed a global fragrance licensing deal with Parlux Fragrances. The perfume debuted in the US in September, 2009, with international distribution to follow. The company also launched Natorious, a new ready-to-wear line in the fall of 2008, expanding the company's apparel footprint beyond its traditional lingerie, loungewear, sleepwear, and underwear. The collection was rebranded as Josie Natori in the fall of 2010.
