= Women's World Banking =

Nonprofit organization

- Founded: 1979; 47 years ago
- Founders: Esther Afua Ocloo, Ela Bhatt, Michaela Walsh; Elizabeth Mary Okelo
- Legal status: 501(c)(3)
- Purpose: To create growth for financial service providers along with economic opportunity for low-income women in the emerging markets.
- Headquarters: New York City, New York, U.S.
- Coordinates: 40.751330°N 73.976450°W
- Method: Women-Centered Policy & Product Design
- President, Chief Executive Officer: Mary Ellen Iskenderian
- Website: www.womensworldbanking.org

Women's World Banking is a global nonprofit organization dedicated to women's economic empowerment through financial inclusion.

== Mission and vision ==
As an NGO, Women's World Banking (WWB) partners with financial institutions and policymakers to design and develop solutions and programs that facilitate systemic change for women.

As an investor, WWB Asset Management advances women in the workplace and as customers through direct equity to bring financial security, prosperity and independence to women.

== History and governance ==
Women's World Banking was born out of an idea conceived during the first United Nations World Conference on Women, held in Mexico City in 1975 to coincide with the International Women's Year and to mark the start of the "UN Decade for Women" (1976–1985).

The Mexico City conference was convened by the United Nations General Assembly to focus international attention on the need to develop future-oriented goals, effective strategies, and plans of action for the advancement of women. It was there that Michaela’s vision for change took shape after crossing paths with incredible individuals, such as Kenyan entrepreneur and banker, Mary Okelo, Indian cooperative organizer (SEWA) and Gandhian, Ela Bhatt, and Ghanaian businesswoman and microloan pioneer, Esther Ocloo. Their shared belief in the power of women was palpable and their comradery was almost instant. They determined that economic independence can reinforce women's rights, enabling them to make choices and affect their own education, opportunity and well-being. Providing small loans and other financial services to poor women entrepreneurs was seen to be a powerful weapon in the global fight against poverty. Women's World Banking was founded four years later by several women leaders from a diversity of cultures. According to Bhatt, the goal was "To reach women who have been bypassed by the traditional banking system and to bring them into the economic mainstream."

In 1979, WWB was officially incorporated, registering in the Netherlands as Stichting (Foundation) to Promote Women's World Banking, an international nonprofit organization with the objective of providing women entrepreneurs with the capital and information necessary to access the money economy of their own countries and build viable businesses.

In 1991, Nancy Barry became WWB's second president. She led the expansion of the WWB network to include major banks, recognizing their potential to be innovative in bringing financial services to poor populations. During her tenure, the WWB network grew to reach nearly 20 million low-income entrepreneurs.

Mary Ellen Iskenderian became WWB's third president in 2006 and she has held the post for over 15 years.

WWB is governed by a Board of Trustees, made up of representatives from the sectors of banking, finance, business, law, and community organizing. "Friends of WWB/USA, Inc." is a 501(c)(3) tax-exempt organization which raises donations from U.S. foundations, corporations and individuals in support of Women's World Banking's global mission, and maintains a separate Board of Directors made up of U.S.-based leaders in law, finance and academia.

At the Clinton Global Initiative Annual Meeting in September 2009, President Barack Obama recalled his mother working at WWB, where "She championed the cause of women's welfare and helped pioneer the micro loans that have helped lift millions out of poverty." The former President's mother, Ann Dunham-Soetoro, was WWB's policy coordinator in the mid-1990s, and her work was pivotal in informing the policy platform of the United Nations Fourth World Conference on Women in Beijing in 1995.

== Focus on women ==
Research began to show that granting women microloans had an enduring, more profound impact on the broader well-being of the population. Access to credit gave women not just more control over household assets, but also more autonomy and decision-making power and greater participation in public life. Empowering women economically had a multiplier effect as well. Evidence showed that poor women reinvested much more of their income in their families and communities than men did—financing such items as health care, education for their children, and home improvement. The woman entrepreneur as the gateway to household and community stability became a fundamental basis for the microfinance business model and a guiding principle behind the value of microfinance as a tool for poverty alleviation.

== Products and policy ==
As the financial inclusion cause grew, WWB has created new products, including; savings, remittances, housing/home improvement loans, pensions, insurance and worked with countless central banks and regulatory bodies to advocate for a gender lens in their national frameworks and public infrastructure systems. WWB also offers its network members advisory and technical assistance, including; research, branding and leadership.

== The Global Member Network ==
As a network, WWB does not issue loans directly to microentrepreneurs. Rather, it serves as a partner to its members, in their respective markets across five regions: Asia, Eastern Europe, Latin America and the Caribbean, and the Middle East and North Africa. As of 2009, the network represented an outstanding loan portfolio of more than US$5.5 billion and an average loan size per borrower of $1,200.

In 2007, ten WWB network members were named on Forbes magazine's first-ever list of the world's top 50 MFIs.

In 2009, thirteen network members were named on the Global 100 Composite Ranking by the Microfinance Information Exchange (the MIX), a nonprofit organization that provides business information and data services for the microfinance industry. This list highlights institutions that achieve high outreach and low transaction costs while being both profitable and transparent.

== Women and leadership ==
Women's leadership has been a core element of women's financial inclusion progress. Many of the industry's pioneers were women, and a solid female managerial contingent held steady as MFIs grew.

The business case for gender diversity in microfinance maintains that organizations that successfully hire, retain and promote women will achieve not just social benefits, but also financial returns. According to a 2007 report, Fortune 500 companies with the highest representation of women board directors attained significantly higher financial performance on average than those with the lowest representation. A 2007 study of 226 MFIs in 57 countries demonstrated that when the CEO of an MFI was a woman, the MFI showed a higher return on assets and lower operational costs.

The microfinance industry saw a compound annual growth rate of 43% between 2004 and 2008 Research shows that within Women's World Banking member institutions between 2003 and 2007, the percentage of women in board positions declined from 66% to 58% and in senior management from 66% to 51%.

=== The road ahead ===
742 million women still remain excluded from the formal financial system, hindering their economic potential. Women's World Banking is dedicated to reach 100 million women between 2017-2027 to transform their lives and uplift entire communities.
