= Mary Ellen Iskenderian =

American banker

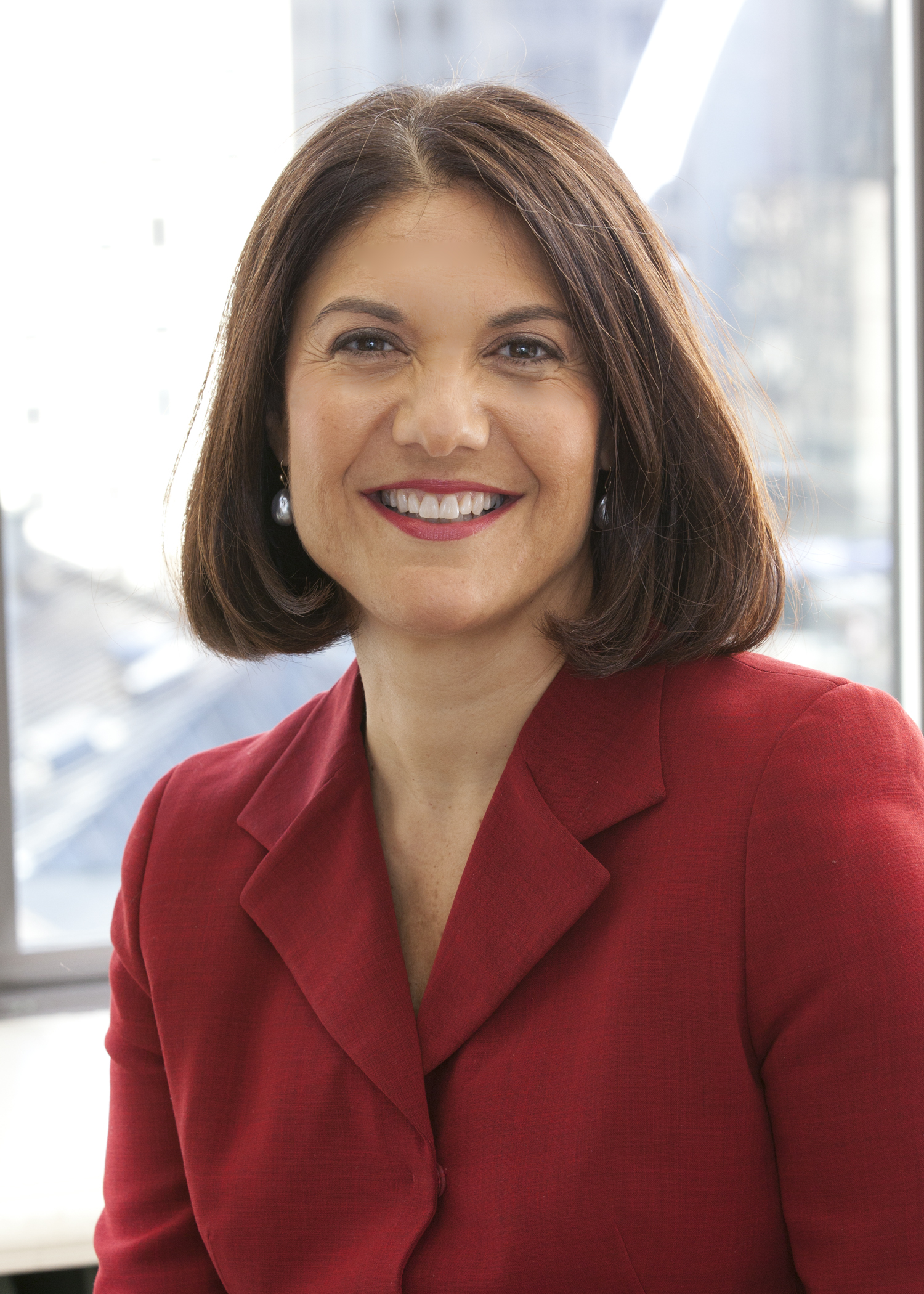

President and CEO of Women's World Banking

Mary Ellen Iskenderian is president and CEO of Women's World Banking, the world's largest network of microfinance institutions and banks. She is also a board member of the Hewlett Foundation.

She has written columns in Forbes magazine and The Wall Street Journal and is a regular contributor to the Harvard Business Review blog.

== Education and career ==
Iskenderian holds an MBA from the Yale School of Management and a B.S. in International Economics from the Georgetown University School of Foreign Service.

Prior to joining Women's World Banking, Iskenderian was a senior manager at the International Finance Corporation of the World Bank Group and held leadership positions including Director of Partnership Development, Director of Global Financial Markets Portfolio and Director of the South Asia Regional Department. She is on the Board of Directors of Kashf Microfinance Bank in Pakistan and is a permanent member of the Council on Foreign Relations. She serves as an Advisor to the Clinton Global Initiative and is a judge for the annual Financial Times Sustainable Banking Awards. She was also recently invited by Secretary of State Hillary Clinton to be a member of the US delegation to the Asia-Pacific Economic Conference (APEC) 2011 Women and the Economy Summit. Iskenderian is a past recipient of NYU Stern's Distinguished Citi Fellowship in Leadership and Ethics, the Isabel Benham Award from the Women's Bond Club, and the companion Women's Finance Award given by the Institute of Financial Services at Lucerne University, Switzerland. Previously, she worked for the investment bank Lehman Brothers.
