= Josie Natori =

Filipino-American fashion designer (born 1947)

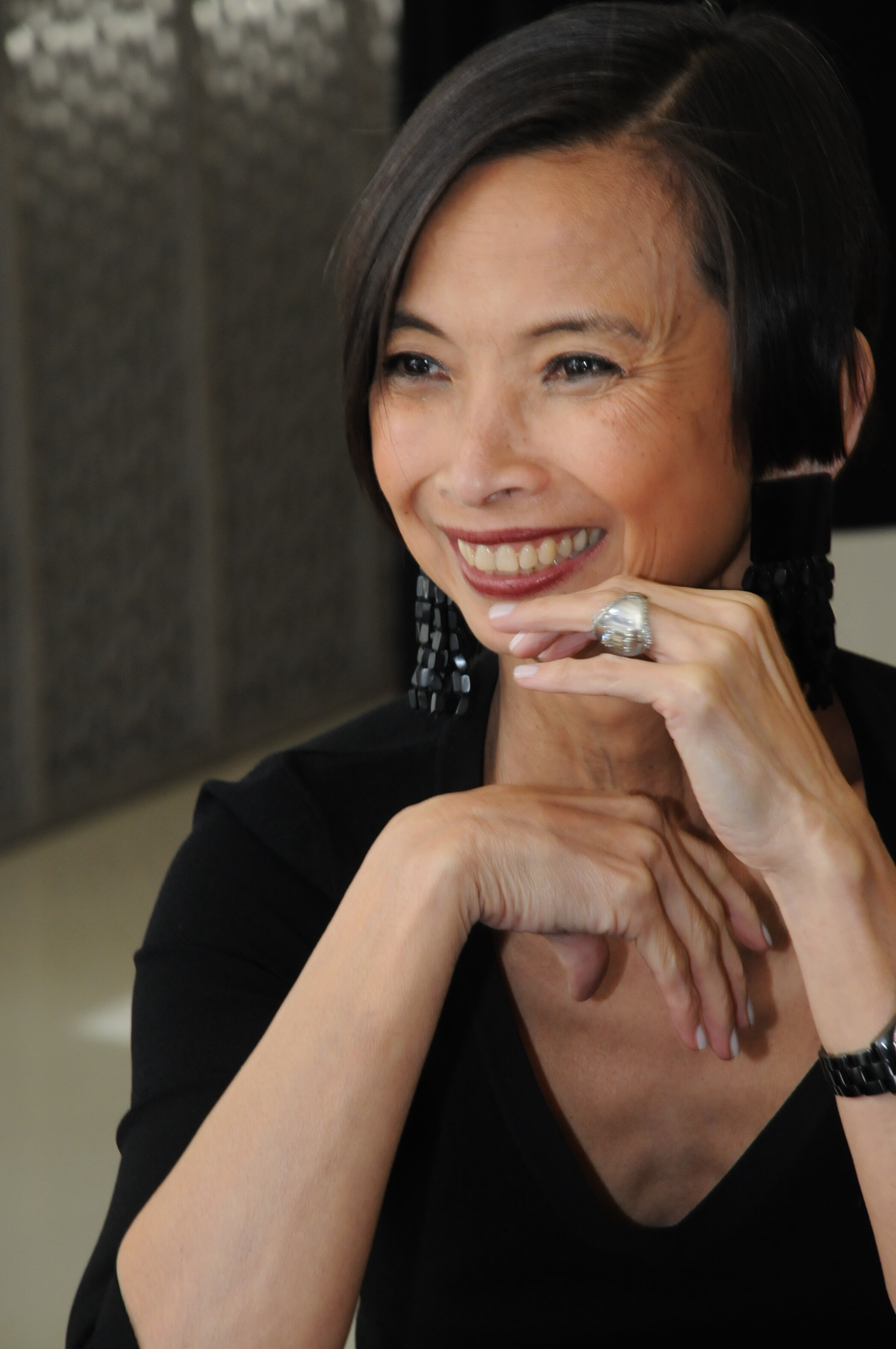
- Josie Natori in 2009
- Born: Josefina Almeda Cruz; May 9, 1947 (age 79); Manila, Philippines
- Education: Manhattanville College
- Labels: Josie Natori; Natori; Josie; N Natori
- Spouse: Kenneth "Ken" Natori (m. 1972)
- Awards: Order of Lakandula; Peopling of America, 2007 (Ellis Island Family Heritage Awards); Commissioner on the White House Conference on Small Business

Josie Natori (born Josefina Almeda Cruz, May 9, 1947) is a Filipino-American fashion designer and the CEO and founder of The Natori Company. Natori served as a commissioner on the White House Conference on Small Business. In March 2007 she was awarded the Order of Lakandula, one of the highest civilian awards in the Philippines. In April 2007, Natori received the "Peopling of America" Award from the Statue of Liberty - Ellis Island Foundation. She often says her business philosophy is based around an "East-West mix" of culture and design.

== Early life ==
Josefina Almeda Cruz was born in the Philippines in 1947. Her mother is Angelita Almeda, the sister of Fredesvinda Almeda. Both married construction magnates. Her mother married her father, Felipe Cruz, whose namesake company remains one of the largest in the industry. She was raised in a close-knit Filipino family, as one of six siblings. Her first love was the piano, and she performed solo with the Manila Philharmonic Orchestra at the age of nine. She learned about business from a young age; her grandmother also owned several businesses, including a pharmacy.

== Education and move to America ==
Natori moved to the United States in 1964 to attend Manhattanville College, where she took every economics course she could, and also enrolled in courses at Fordham University. She became a citizen in 1974. Natori has said: "There is no better place in the world for an immigrant to succeed than in the U.S. Follow your dream and make it happen."

== Career ==
In finance

After graduating, she took a corporate finance position as an employee of stock brokerage firm and investment bank Bache & Co., during which she traveled back to Manila to open a branch office there. At 21, she was the assistant manager of the office, a position she held for two years. After the office closed due to market changes, Natori returned to New York and worked at Merrill Lynch, where she rose the ranks to become the first female Vice President in corporate finance. On Wall Street, she also met her husband Ken Natori, who served as a Managing Director of Shearson Lehman. The couple married in 1972. In 1974, Natori became a United States citizen.

Transition to fashion

After six years at Merrill I had become the first woman V.P. in corporate finance, but I was really bored. I wanted to be like my grandmother and have my own company. In retrospect, there was a creative side of me that needed fulfilling, too.

— Josie Natori, The New York Times, June, 2009.

Natori made the move from Wall Street to fashion full-time in 1977, after considering a number of other entrepreneurial ventures from opening a McDonald's franchise, to reproducing antique furniture. She settled on fashion after a buyer at Bloomingdale's suggested she lengthen some peasant blouses sent to her from her native Philippines.

Success in the fashion industry

The Natori Company now sells lingerie, sleepwear, ready-to-wear, and accessories to upscale department stores in the US, and to at least fifteen countries internationally. Natori has said that 70 percent of her company's products are made in the Philippines. In addition to women's clothing, the company is also in the home furnishings industry, and in May, 2008 signed a licensing deal to sell Natori perfume. The perfume debuted in the US in September, 2009, with international distribution to follow. Natori also launched towel and eyewear lines in the Fall of 2009 as well.

Her success came early: In 1978 she operated a 300 square-foot showroom, which by 1983 had expanded to 18,000 square feet. The assassination of Filipino opposition leader Benigno Aquino in 1983 cut off her supply route to and from the Philippines, which almost sank her business, if not for the support of her family.

== Celebrity ==
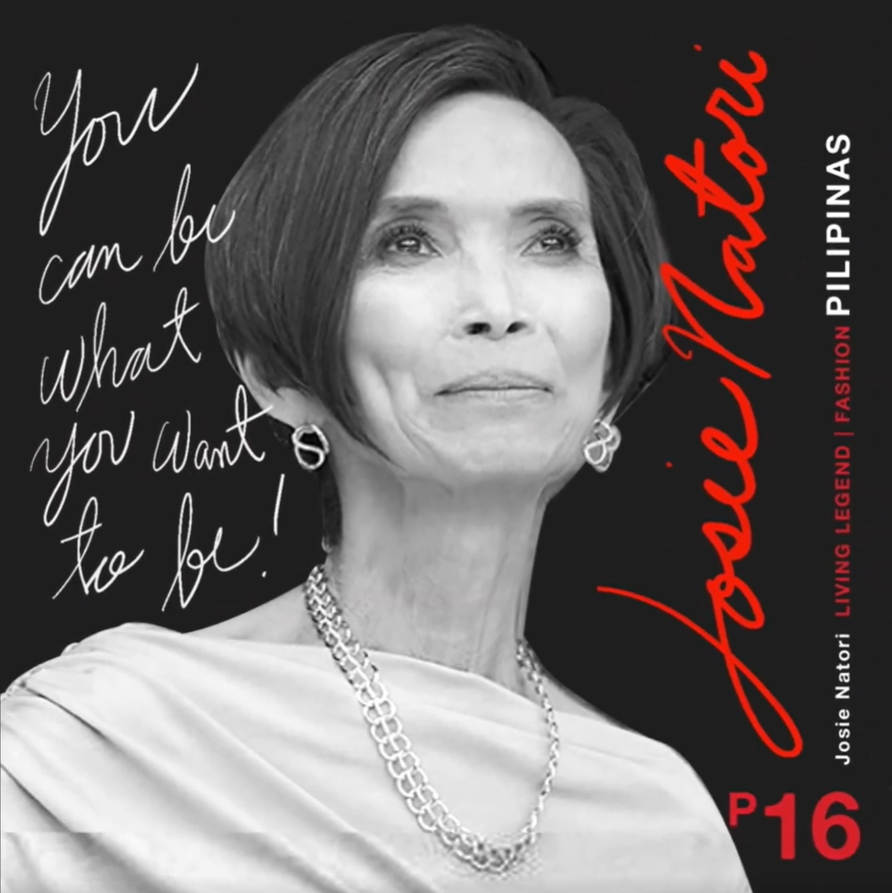
Natori on a 2021 stamp of the Philippines

Natori has been named by Yahoo as a "self-made immigrant millionaire" and furnished the accommodations for Pope Francis during his January 2015 visit to Manila. "Basically, we all helped in our own ways," she said, adding with a laugh. "I provided everything but the soap. "We just wanted to respect the way he lives, which is very simple. Everything was done simply and mostly in white because that is what he would have wanted," Natori told Women's Wear Daily. She has appeared on the Fox Business Network to talk about lingerie business trends and international shipping. "We ship from our factory in the Philippines and also in China and it's a nightmare," Natori told the news channel about delays caused by International Longshore and Warehouse Union work stoppages at West Coast Ports. Natori's parties have been covered by social blogs from New York, and her career switch from finance to fashion has been chronicled by the Oprah media network.

== Collaborations ==
The Natori x Target collaboration — themed "East Meets West" — was Target's first limited-edition lingerie and loungewear collection. Natori's first installment debuted October 30, 2011, ending its run on December 22. The second installment of Asia-inspired silk underwear and other items debuted New Year's Day 2012 and ran until February. The collection consisted of 37 pieces, including bras, panties, robes, knits, leggings, camis, and chemises with prices ranging from $10 to $35.

The company is in a longterm partnership with Luxe Brands to "develop and launch a series of lifestyle collections."

== Businesses and product lines ==
Lingerie

Natori famously chose lingerie over a variety of other ideas for her new business in 1977. She told CNN, "In 1977 lingerie had no style. It was either Victorian or vulgar. Because I had no preconceived notions about what Natori should be, I was able to produce bold, colorful and unexpected lingerie for the time." Shortly after a trunk show in her apartment, Saks Fifth Avenue buyers placed a massive order for 5,000 pieces: "Within three weeks I had $350,000 in orders," she recalled in an interview.

Bedding and home goods

This is a journey through my heritage, in a way. It's ancient Eastern inspiration for modern Western use. Beautiful is beautiful, whatever its time.

— Josie Natori, on the launch of her home goods line in Architectural Digest, October, 2011

Natori partners with JLA Home to manufacture bedding for the Natori, Josie, and N Natori brands. In addition to bedding, Natori also offers bath and beach towels, and in October 2011 she launched sales of "decorative area rugs, decorative room accessories, accent and occasional furniture, decorative tables and floor lighting."

Fragrance

In June 2014, Natori launched JOSIE. "I wanted to create a fragrance for JOSIE that exudes charisma. I am thrilled with the scent – it truly captures the essence of the brand," Natori said when publicizing the product. A 1.7-ounce bottle retails for $75, and the scent includes "a voluptuous bouquet of sampaguita, the national flower of the Philippines," according to the company's promotional texts.

Retail

Natori's products are available at Saks Fifth Avenue, Bergdorf Goodman, Bloomingdales, Nordstrom, Neiman Marcus, Lord & Taylor, Macy's, Anthropologie, Dillard's, Zappos, the Home Shopping Network, Bed, Bath & Beyond, Bare Necessities, Her Room, Amazon, and Designer Living, among other outlets.

New York Boutique

Natori operates a boutique at 253 Elizabeth Street in the NoLIta section of Manhattan, her first stand-alone U.S. store. It offers lingerie, sleepwear, ready-to-wear, home accents, and accessories. At the time of its June 2014 opening, Natori told Women's Wear Daily that it would be "a veritable retail theater" with "everything" for sale, including antiques on display. "I prefer not to look at it as a store but as a lab," Natori said at its opening. Natori previously operated a boutique in Paris for twelve years. She says it lost money every year but it helped get her brand noticed.

== Awards and honors ==
On October 3, 2008, Bank of the Philippine Islands director Zobel de Ayala and Labor Secretary Marianito Roque awarded the 2008 BPInoy Award for Natori at the Makati Shangri-La Hotel. In 2007, Natori celebrated her 30th year as the CEO-founder of The Natori Company. Natori also received the Galleon Award from Corazon Aquino in 1998.

In 2021, Natori along with nine others were featured in a Philippine postage stamp collection called Living Legends: World-Renowned Filipinos by Philippine Postal Corporation. Other personalities included in the collection are Lea Salonga, Kenneth Cobonpue, Diosdado Banatao, Efren "Bata" Reyes, Rafael "Paeng" Nepomuceno, Eugene Torre, Monique Lhuillier, Jordan Clarkson, and Jollibee.

Natori is a member of the Council of Fashion Designers of America (CFDA).

== Personal and family life ==
Natori is a self-described shopaholic who shops to relax. Natori says she still talks to her mother, who lives in Manila, on the phone every night. Her husband Kenneth is the chairman of her company, and her son, also named Kenneth, is a vice president of the company focusing on e-commerce, finance, licensing, and pr/marketing. Natori visits her grandchildren, Cruz and Zoe, daily, and takes them to school before she begins her work day. Her son Kenneth married Anika Proskurowski in June 2007, according to an announcement in the New York Times. Anika blogs for the company's contemporary Josie collection as the Josie Girl.

=== Residences ===
Natori has said she loves the energy of New York City but she and her husband also have a weekend home in Westchester, New York.
