= Verin Karmiraghbyur =

Verin Karmiraghbyur Վերին Կարմիրաղբյուր
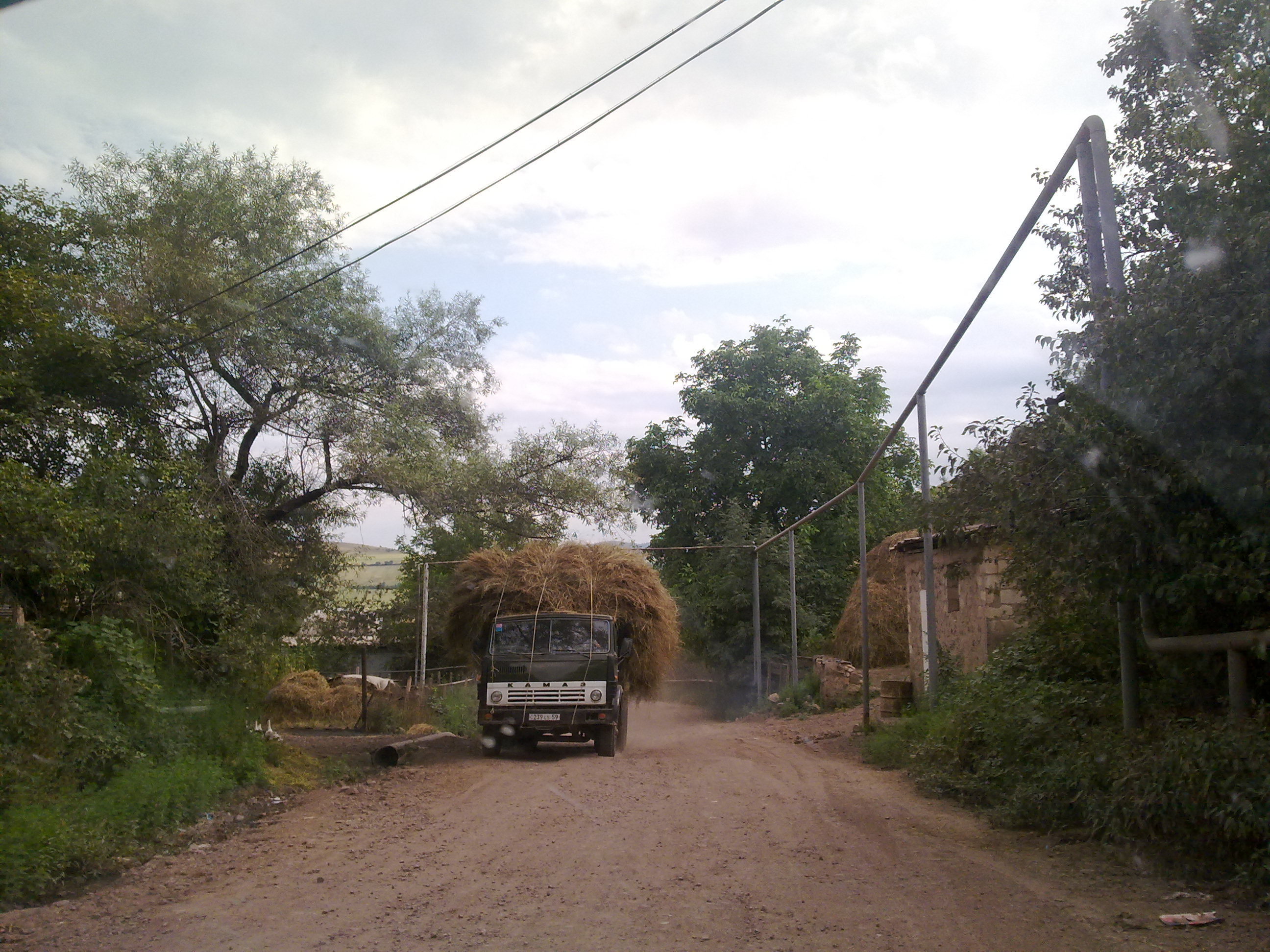
- Verin Karmiraghbyur

- Location within Armenia Location within Tavush
- Coordinates: 40°53′03″N 45°26′29″E
- Country: Armenia
- Province: Tavush
- Municipality: Berd
- Established: 1860

Government
  - Mayor: Kamo Chobanyan
- Elevation: 1,320 m (4,330 ft)

Population (2011)
  - Total: 1,632
- Time zone: UTC+4 (AMT)

Verin Karmiraghbyur (Armenian: Վերին Կարմիրաղբյուր) is a village in the Berd Municipality of the Tavush Province of Armenia.

== Gallery ==
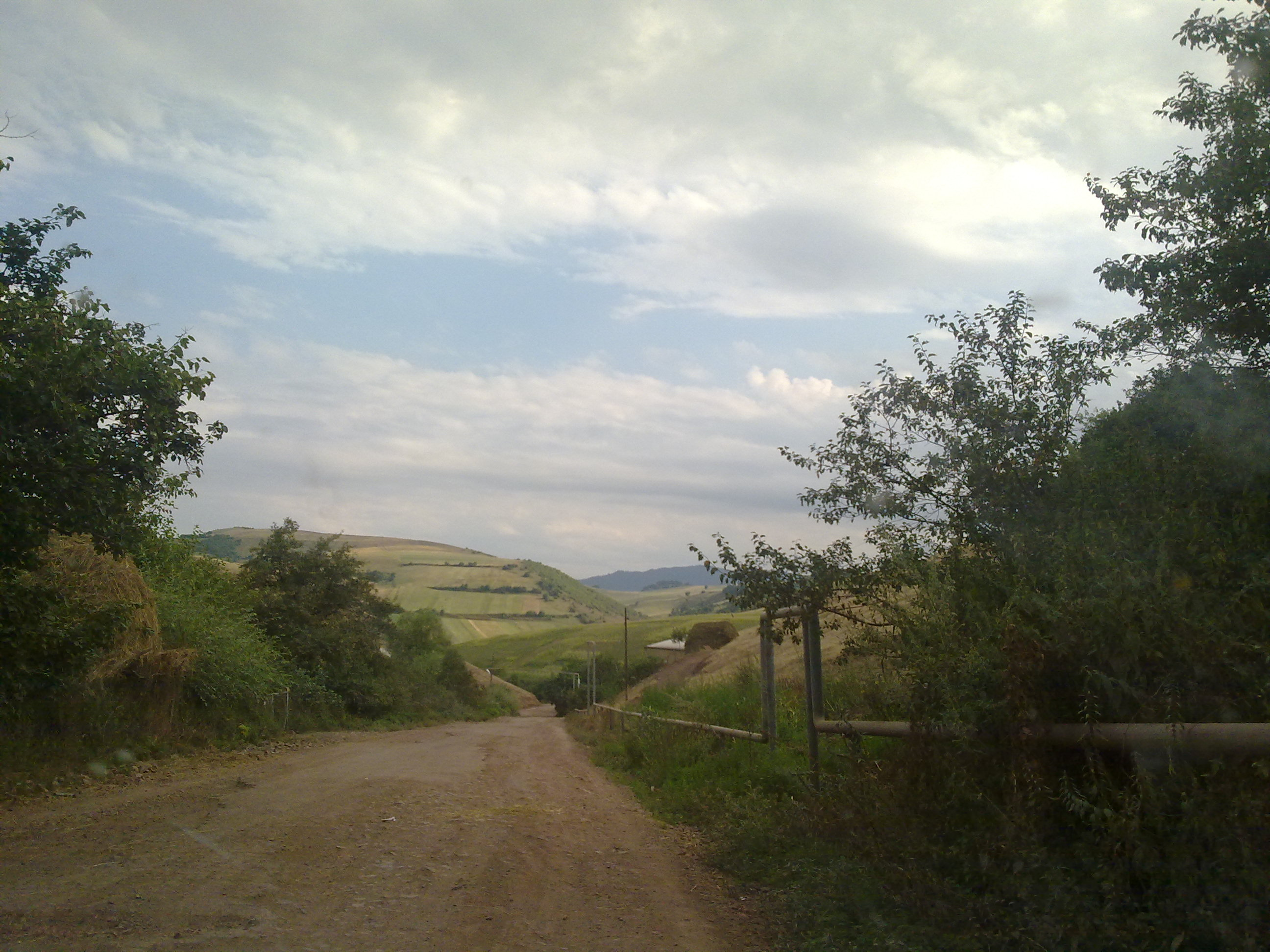
Scenery

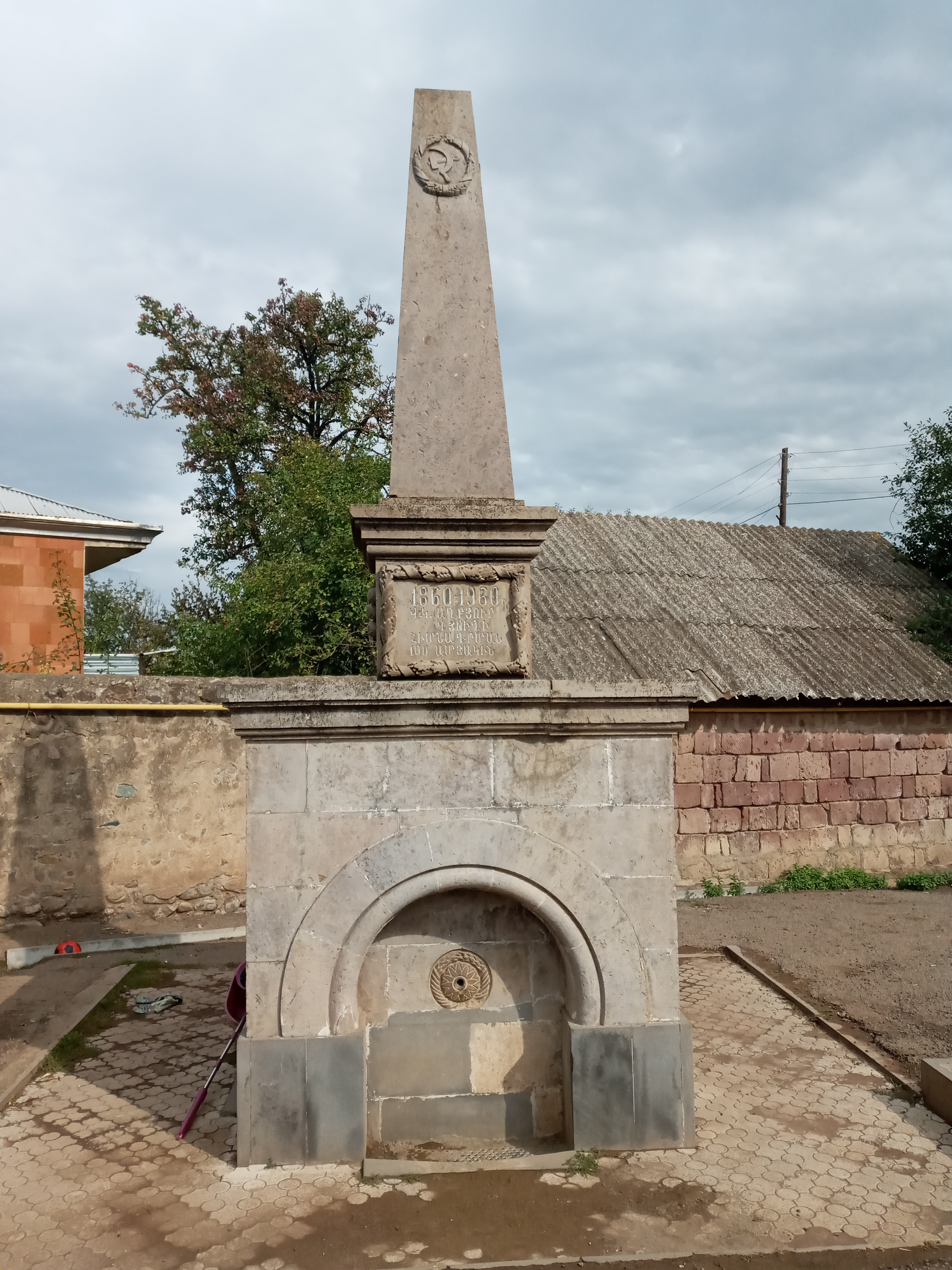
100 year memorial spring

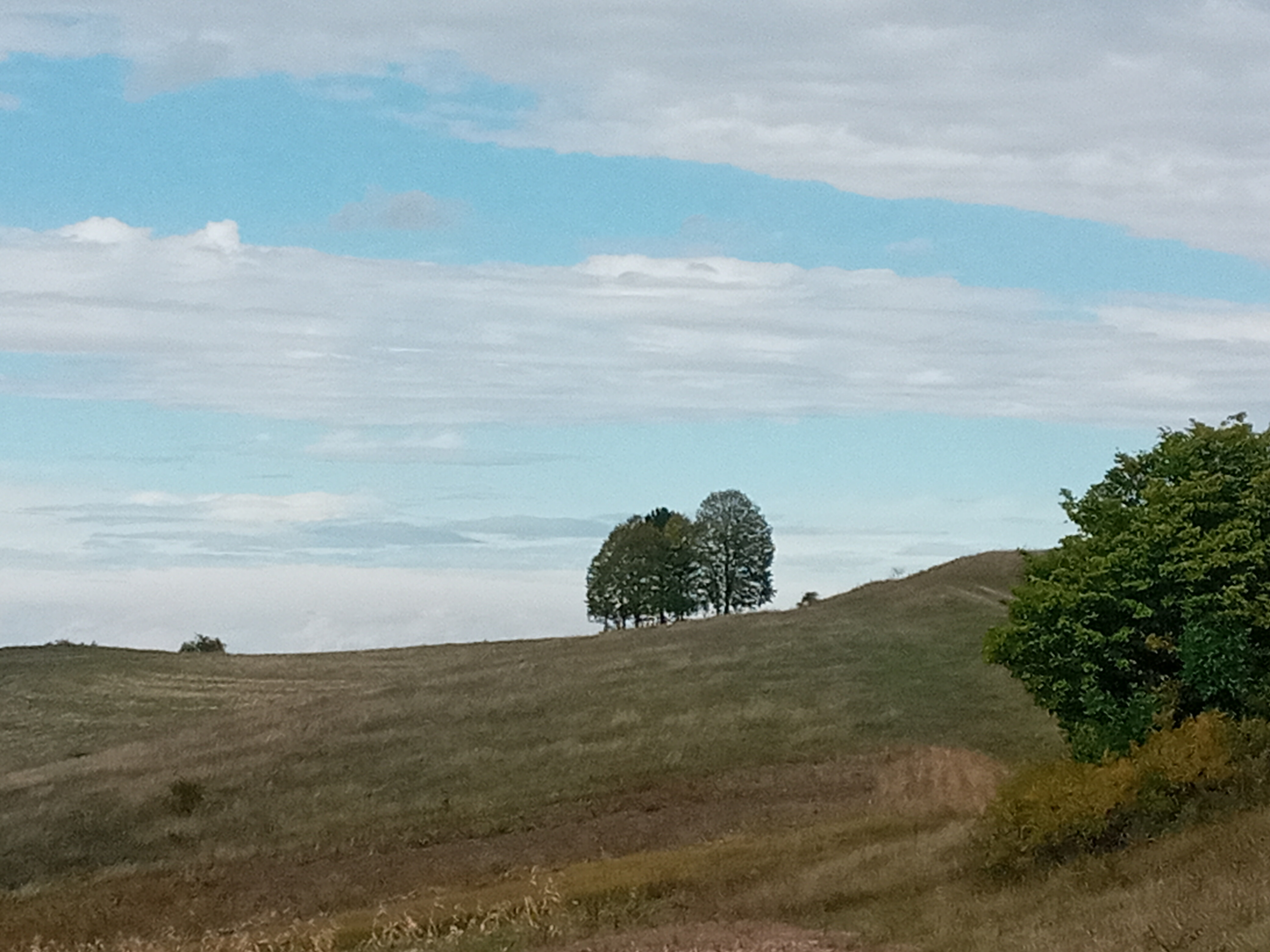
Scenery

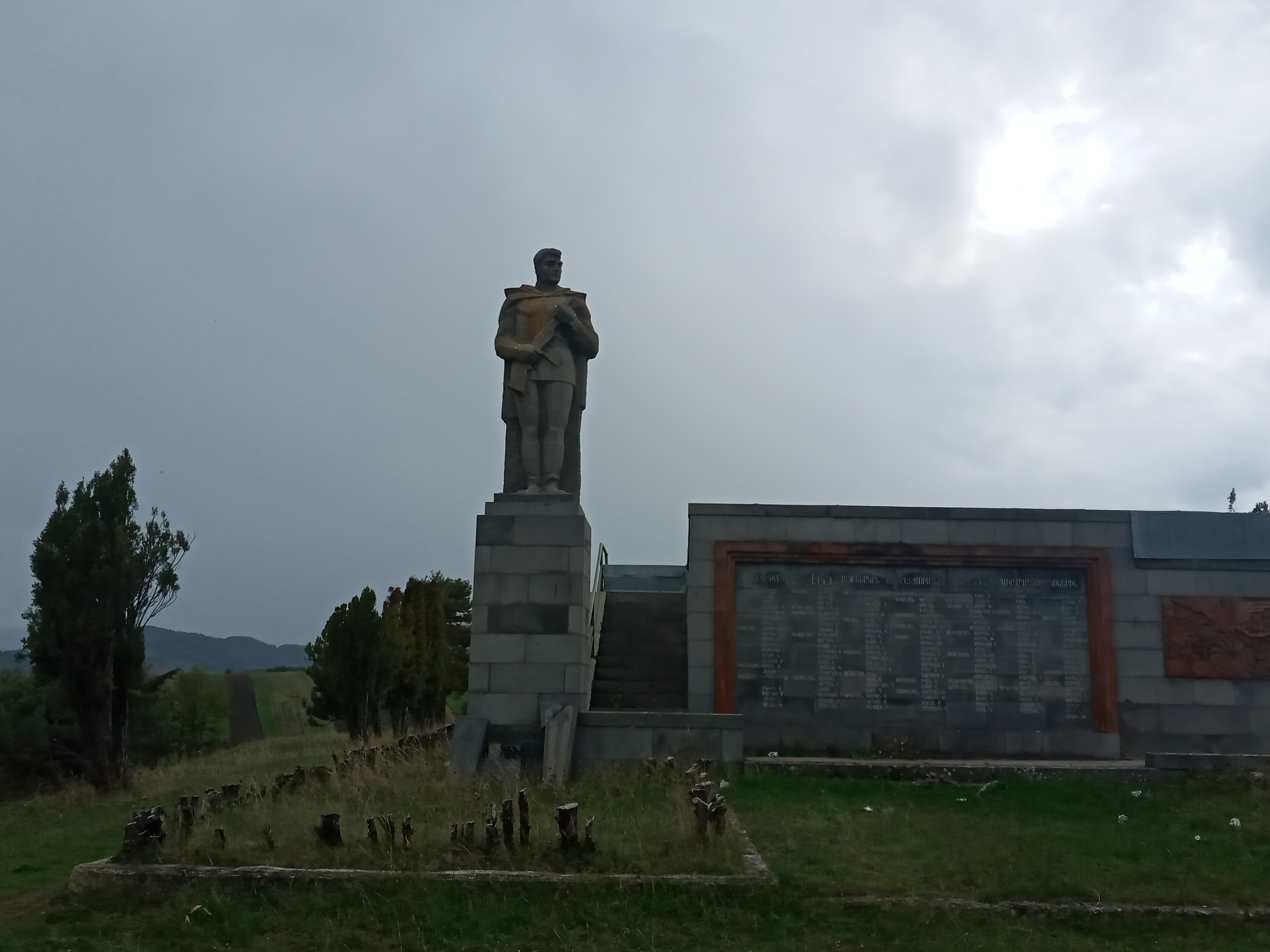
WWII monument
