= Pavel Gukasov =

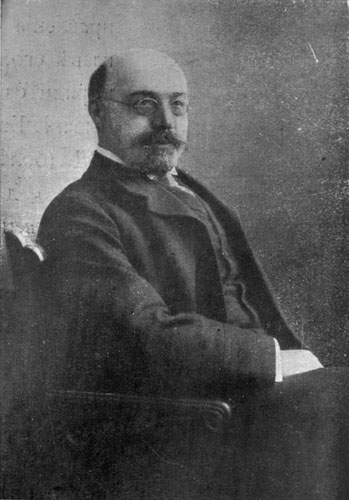
Pavel Osipovich Gukasov

Pavel Osipovich Gukasov (Russian: Па́вел О́сипович Гука́сов; 22 January 1858 [O.S. 3 February], Shusha – 22 December 1937, Paris) was an Armenian industrialist who with his brother, Abram, played a major role in the industrialisation of the oil industry of Imperial Russia. He held management positions in 13 Russian companies before the Russian Revolution in 1917.
