= Mary Perkins Ryan =

American Catholic author, editor, and educator (1912–1993)

Mary Perkins Ryan (April 10, 1912 – October 12, 1993) was an American Catholic author, editor, and educator.

== Biography ==
Mary Perkins was born in 1912 in Boston to Charles Perkins and Elizabeth Ward Perkins, and was educated in New York City at Manhattanville College of the Sacred Heart. She married John Julian Ryan in 1942. Mary Perkins Ryan was the only married woman to attend the Liturgical Congress at Assisi, Italy, in 1956.

== Writings ==
- At Your Ease in the Catholic Church (1938, Sheed & Ward, New York), as Mary Perkins. From the front flyleaf: "This is, we believe, the first "book of etiquette for Catholics" ever published. At first glance it may seem absurd that we should need one, but have you never been puzzled by such apparently easy questions as how to address a letter to a Bishop, and how to end it? Whether it makes a difference if he is an English Bishop? Or, if you are asked to be a god-parent, do you know just what is expected of you, first at the Church, and afterwards throughout your own and your god-child's life? These and a hundred other matters are clearly and amusingly explained in this book, the subjects discussed ranging from the very simplest way to manage a Missal to what to do (and what not to do) when a Catholic doctrine or practice is attacked in your presence."
- Your Catholic Language, Latin from the Missal (1940, Sheed & Ward, New York), as Mary Perkins. From the front flyleaf: "The author of At Your Ease in the Catholic Church had the brilliant idea of teaching Catholics to read Latin by teaching them to read the Missal. The result is a grammar book like no other. Learning Latin takes on some of the excitement of a detective story and some of the excitement of a crossword puzzle: and the excitements are fruitful since you will find yourself at the end of the game At Your Ease in the Latin Tongue."
- Speaking of How to Pray (1944, Sheed & Ward, New York), as Mary Perkins. From the front flyleaf: "Mary Perkins of At Your Ease in the Catholic Church has written another deeply human and Catholic book. She shows how the Church's theology and the flower of that theology, the liturgy, can be integrated into the layman's life. She shows how rich life and prayer can become through such an integration."
- Beginning At Home: The Challenge of Christian Parenthood (1955).
- Are parochial schools the answer?: Catholic education in light of the council (1964).
- Womanhood in America: from colonial times to present (1979).

== Literature ==
- Ann Morrow Heekin. Reclaiming a Lost Leader: Mary Perkins Ryan, Visionary in Modern Catholic Education // Religious Education, Volume 103, 2008 - Issue 2, pp. 196-217.
- New Catholic Encyclopedia.
