= Carolyn Rafaelian =

American designer, philanthropist, and businesswoman

- Born: 1966 or 1967 (age 59–60)
- Citizenship: American
- Education: American College in Los Angeles
- Occupation: Entrepreneur
- Known for: Founder and 80% owner, Alex and Ani
- Children: 3

Carolyn Rafaelian is an American-Armenian entrepreneur and businesswoman. She is the founder of the accessories and jewelry company Alex and Ani, and the owner of the Belcourt of Newport and Bar and Board Bistro in Newport, Rhode Island.

== Background ==
Rafaelian's father opened a jewelry factory in 1966, Cinerama Jewelry, in which Rafaelian and her sister worked. Over time she helped her father design pieces and produced original designs herself for her father's jewelry manufacturing company. She attended Prout Memorial High School for Girls (later known as The Prout School). She attended the University of Rhode Island between 1987 and 1989, and then she transferred to and graduated from the American College for the Applied Arts in Los Angeles. In 1994 she joined her father's business, and eventually began to work on her own line. In 2002 Rafaelian became co-owner of Cinerama with her sister. Rafaelian's designs became the main seller for the company, and in 2016 Alex and Ani bought the manufacturing facility for an undisclosed sum.

== Business career ==
In 2004 Rafaelian founded Alex and Ani, a jewelry line named after her two eldest daughters. The brand started with five cocktail rings and expanded into a full line of jewelry anchored by its patented expandable wire bangle.

Rafaelian has been interviewed by newspapers regarding current events, including the New York Daily News. Rafaelian received the 2012 Rhode Island Small Businessperson of the Year award from the Small Business Administration for her work with Alex and Ani, and also the Ernst & Young Entrepreneur of Year in the products category for New England. Her firm's revenue grew from $5 million in 2010 to over $500 million in 2016 and the company's Charity By Design initiative, where 20% of sales go to charity, makes up 20% of sales.

Rafaelian owns Bar and Board Bistro in Newport and a cafe franchise called Teas and Javas; some of its cafes are attached to Alex and Ani stores, and some are independent. She is also the owner of the Rhode Island winery Carolyn's Sakonnet Vineyard, purchased in 2012 which features wine making, dining area and locally sourced foods. Following her takeover, the vineyard won several awards in international competition. Rafaelian sold the vineyard in 2024.

In 2026, Rafaelian launched Alchemist Mint to produce limited edition coins from copper salvaged from the Statue of Liberty's 1984-1986 restoration, using reclaimed materials through the entire production cycle from melting to finishing.

== Personal life ==
Rafaelian is divorced from her first husband.

Rafaelian is the owner of a 60-room mansion, the Belcourt of Newport, formerly known as Belcourt Castle, in Newport, Rhode Island, built in 1894.

Rhode Island Monthly described Rafaelian's charitable work as including "Project USA, a nonprofit, which has raised funds for the victims of Hurricane Katrina, survivors of breast cancer, and endangered species" as well as separate projects with the Humane Society of the United States.

Rafaelian was listed 22nd in Forbes America's Richest Self-Made Women in 2016, with net worth estimated at $700 million in June 2016. In May 2017, she was recognized by the David Lynch Foundation for her humanitarian efforts. In June 2018, Rafaelian was estimated to be worth $1 billion, and 18th on the Forbes list of America's richest self-made women, owning 80% of Alex and Ani. By June 2019 her net worth had dropped to an estimated $520 million.
