= Alex and Ani =

Jewelry company

Coordinates: 41°45′19.4″N 71°27′31.0″W

- Company type: Private
- Industry: Jeweller and retailer
- Founded: 2004
- Founder: Carolyn Rafaelian
- Website: alexandani.com

Alex and Ani is an American retailer and producer of jewelry located in Cranston, Rhode Island.

== History ==
The firm was founded in 2004 by Carolyn Rafaelian. The name comes from a combination of the first names of Rafaelian's two daughters. The company originally stated that they wanted to produce "bangle bracelets, necklaces, earrings and rings that adorn the body, enlighten the mind, and empower the spirit". The company first manufactured its jewelry in a factory that was founded by Rafaelian's father in 1966 and all materials were made in America.

The first retail Alex and Ani store opened in Newport in 2009, and in addition to the stand-alone stores, the jewelry was sold through national departments stores. In 2011, American retail company The Paper Store LLC invested over $10 million to build "shop within a shop" areas featuring the jewelry brand Alex and Ani in many of their stores.

In 2010 Giovanni Feroce joined the company as CEO and drove the company's expansion, increasing the sales total for the year by more than 20 times its previous annual total. In 2011, the company launched its Charity By Design program where 20% of sales go to charity. It also partnered with the Newport Folk Festival and Newport Jazz Festival to create specialty charms for each ticket buyer of each festival. In 2013 the company partnered with the New England Patriots and New England Revolution sports teams to provide sports-themed merchandise and uniforms. That year the company also published Path of Life: Why I Wear My Alex and Ani, a book co-authored by Feroce and Alex and Ani corporate historian Cyd McKenna.

The company's revenue grew from $5 million in 2010 to over $500 million in 2016. In 2012, the company acquired a majority stake in the advertising agency Mediapeel after becoming the firm's largest client, changing the company name to Seven Swords Media. Also in 2012, the firm opened its first European branded stores. That year, JH Partners acquired a large stake in the firm, adding it to its lifestyle portfolio. JH Partners cashed out in 2014, selling its 40% stake in the company to British buyout firm Lion Capital, in a deal that valued the company at $1 billion.

In March 2014, Rafaelian fired Feroce, the company's CEO. In March 2015, Harlan Kent, a former CEO of Yankee Candle, became the new president of the company. That year, the company expanded into Japan, and began a partnership with Disney Parks, to provide jewelry for their souvenir stores. Kent left the company within a year.

In 2016, Rafaelian purchased original copper from the Statue of Liberty and the company launched the Liberty Copper Collection. In 2017, Alex and Ani became the primary "presenting sponsor" of David Lynch's arts and music festival, the Festival of Disruption.

In October 2017, the company's Australian distributor, House of Brands, closed the Alex and Ani concept store in Melbourne, as well as all related kiosks in malls in Australia, announcing that it would shut down the related website in January 2018. House of Brands had been the company's distributor in Australia and New Zealand since December 2015.

At the end of 2017, the company's CEO, Cindy DiPietrantonio, and its CFO, Bob Woodruff, left the company; over serving in their roles for just over a year. In September 2018, the company announced that it intended to sell more of its pieces directly to consumers, rather than through distributors, with a goal of 75 to 80 percent of sales being through its stores or its websites by March 2020, up from its current 50 percent. The company said it planned to open 25 to 30 more concept stores within a year.

In July 2019, Alex and Ani filed a $1.1 billion federal lawsuit against Bank of America, asserting that the lender had discriminated in its treatment of the woman-led company. The company dismissed the suit in August, and in September 2019 agreed to a new debt structure with its syndicate of lenders, led by Bank of America. As part of the restructuring, Rafaelian had given up her controlling equity interest, and Lion Capital installed a new CEO, Bob Trabucco. In May 2020, Rafaelian was officially terminated as an employee of the company.

On June 9, 2021, the company filed for Chapter 11 bankruptcy protection. The company attributes their bankruptcy filing to falling revenue in the wake of operational and supply chain difficulties as well as major turnover in their C-suite, which led to a 2019 out-of-court restructuring, plus the COVID-19 pandemic played a major role in the company's revenue decline.

At the time of the bankruptcy filing, founder Rafaelian was no longer involved with the company she started. In late 2022, Rafaelian launched Metal Alchemist, another jewelry company based in Rhode Island that uses American-made products and sticks to Rafaelian's Rhode Island roots.

Early in 2023, Alex and Ani had 38 stores across the United States. In June 2023, Alex and Ani had closed another 21 stores and their corporate headquarters in Rhode Island overnight, leaving 7 locations still open.

In November 2023, months after Alex and Ani abruptly vacated their East Greenwich, Rhode Island headquarters, it left behind thousands of pieces of equipment, and unpaid bills from local business owners, its landlord, and the town of East Greenwich. Sal Corio, the owner of SJ Corio Company conducted the auction and told The Boston Globe that the bagging equipment alone was worth "more than $200,000" if it had been purchased new. He was initially hired by Alex and Ani to auction off their own equipment, but told The Boston Globe that they "locked him out" and never communicated with him again. Not long after, Corio was contacted by the property owner, who hired him to carry out the auction. The auction attracted more than 900 bidders.

In August 2025, Alex and Ani officially releases collaboration products with several Mattel's brands, such as Hot Wheels, Barbie, UNO, and Polly Pocket to celebrate Mattel's 80th anniversary.

== Activities ==
The firm produces bangles, bracelets, necklaces, earrings, and rings. The company first came to national attention in 2004 when they produced a necklace featuring an apple for Gwyneth Paltrow following the birth of her daughter Apple, leading to many orders of similar merchandise.

The firm has begun collaborating with national organizations to create custom pieces and give a portion of proceeds to the respective charity.

A signature design feature of the company's products is the "patented sliding mechanism that replaces the traditional clasp, making each bracelet entirely adjustable" making it "one-size-fits-all". Rafaelian patented the Alex and Ani 14-gauge wire bangle in 2004; it is one of about 30 patents the company now holds.

== Awards ==
- 2011 : 470th in the Inc. 500 list and 16th on their retail sector list
