= List of Rhode Island suffragists =

This is a list of Rhode Island suffragists, suffrage groups and others associated with the cause of women's suffrage in Rhode Island.

== Groups ==
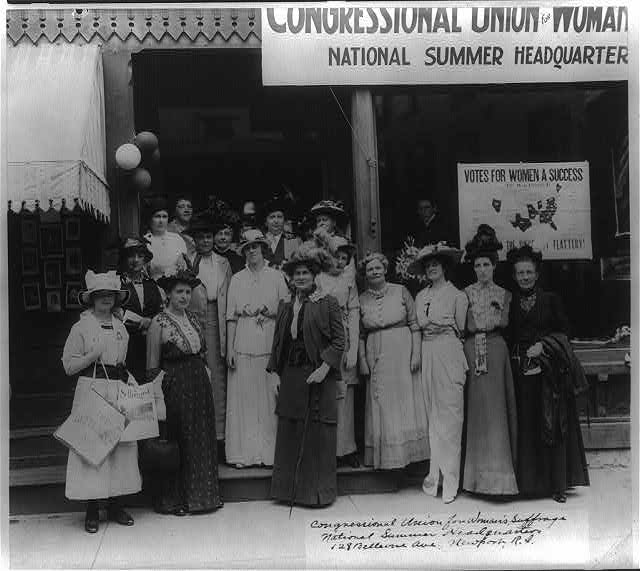
Congressional Union for Women's Suffrage at their summer headquarters in Newport, Rhode Island, c. 1914

- Bristol Equal Suffrage League.
- College Equal Suffrage League, Rhode Island group formed in 1907.
- Congressional Union of Providence, Rhode Island, created in 1916.
- Jamestown Equal Suffrage League.
- Newport County Woman Suffrage League, founded in 1908.
- Providence Woman Suffrage Party.
- Rhode Island Equal Suffrage Association, formed in 1915.
- Rhode Island Women's Suffrage Association, created in 1868.
- Rhode Island Women's Suffrage Party, created in 1913.
- Rhode Island Union of Colored Women's Clubs, created in 1903.
- Woman's Newport League.
- Women's Political Equality League of Providence.

== Suffragists ==
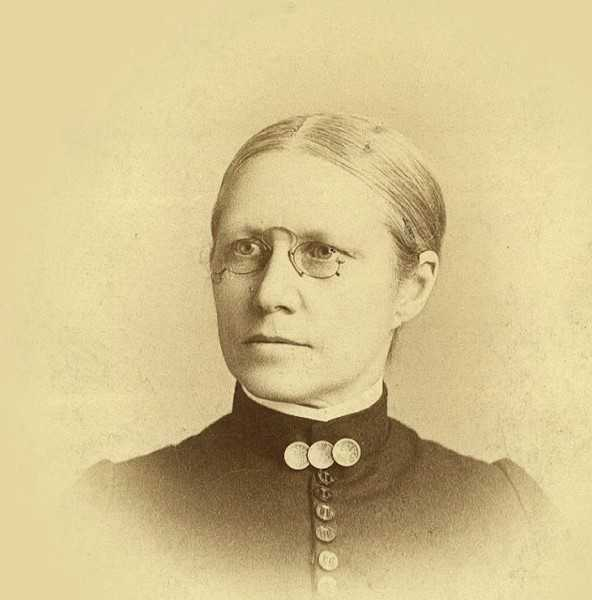
Sarah Elizabeth Doyle

- Esther H. Abelson (Pawtucket).
- Sara Algeo.
- Agnes Bacon (Providence).
- Mary Rathbone Kelly Ballou (Providence and Portsmouth).
- Alva Belmont (Newport).
- Mae E. Profitt Bentley (Providence).
- Ellen M. Bolles.
- Rose Talliaferro Bradic (Providence).
- Emeline S. Burlingame (1836–1923).
- Margaret M. Campbell.
- Elizabeth Buffum Chace (Providence).
- Elizabeth Kittridge Churchill.
- Paulina Wright Davis (Providence).
- Ardelia C. Dewing.
- Mary H. Dickerson (Newport).
- Sarah E. Doyle.
- Maud Howe Elliot (Newport).
- Jeanette S. French.
- Hannah E. Greene (Providence).
- Annie M. Griffin.
- Frederick A. Hinckley (Providence).
- Bertha Higgins (Providence).
- Julia Ward Howe (Portsmouth).
- Mary E. Jackson (Providence).
- Maria Albertina Kindberg (Providence).
- Maria Ingeborg Kindstedt (Providence).
- Sophia Little.
- Deborah Knox Livingston.
- Clara Brownell May Miller (Newport).
- Martha H. Mowry (Providence).
- Mabel E. Orgelman (Bristol).
- Fanny Purdy Palmer (Providence)
- Annie Peck (Providence).
- Rhoda Anna Fairbanks Peckham.
- Lucy Proffitt.
- Charlotte B. Wilbour.
- Anna Garlin Spencer (Providence).
- Rowena Peck Barnes Tingley.
- Camillo von Klenze.
- Frances H. Whipple (Providence).
- Sarah Helen Whitman (Providence).
- Lillie Chace Wyman (Valley Falls).
- Elizabeth Upham Yates.

=== Politicians supporting women's suffrage ===
- Robert Livingston Beeckman.
- Clark Burdick (Newport).
- Edward L. Freeman.
- Joseph H. Gainer (Providence).
- Daniel L. D. Granger (Providence).
- Richard W. Jennings.
- Henry B. Kane (Narragansett).
- Walter R. Stiness.

== Suffragists campaigning in Rhode Island ==
- Susan B. Anthony.
- Henry B. Blackwell.
- Carrie Chapman Catt.
- Adelaide A. Claifin.
- James Henry Darlington.
- Frederick Douglass.
- Mary F. Eastman.
- William Lloyd Garrison.
- Laura M. Johns.
- Mary Johnston.
- Louise Hall.
- Henry S. Nash.
- Cora Scott Pond.
- Nancy Schoonmaker.
- Anna Howard Shaw.
- Doris Stevens.
- Lucy Stone.
- Zerelda G. Wallace.

== Places ==
- Marble House.
- Oak Glen.

== Publications ==
- The Amendment.
- The Pioneer and Woman's Advocate, founded in 1852.
- The Una, founded in 1853.

== Anti-suffragists ==
Groups

- Rhode Island Association in Opposition to Woman Suffrage.

Individuals

- Mrs. Edward Johnson.
- Margaret Farnum Lippitt.
- Mary Lippitt Steedman.

== See also ==
- New England Woman Suffrage Association
- Timeline of women's suffrage in Rhode Island
- Women's suffrage in Rhode Island
- Women's suffrage in the United States
