= Timeline of women's suffrage in Rhode Island =

History of women's suffrage in Rhode Island

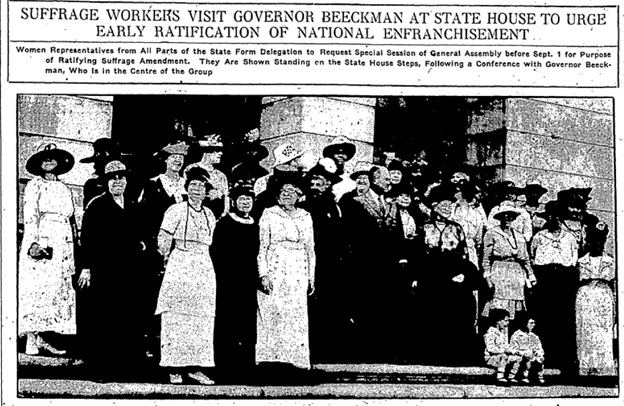
Suffrage workers visit the Rhode Island governor at state house to urge early ratification of 19th Amendment, July 15, 1919

This is a timeline of women's suffrage in Rhode Island. Women's suffrage in Rhode Island started with women's rights activities, such as convention planning and publications of women's rights journals. The first women's suffrage group in Rhode Island was founded in 1868. A women's suffrage amendment was decided by referendum on April 6, 1887, but it failed by a large amount. Finally, in 1917, Rhode Island women gained the right to vote in presidential elections. On January 6, 1920, Rhode Island became the twenty-fourth state to ratify the Nineteenth Amendment.

== 19th century ==
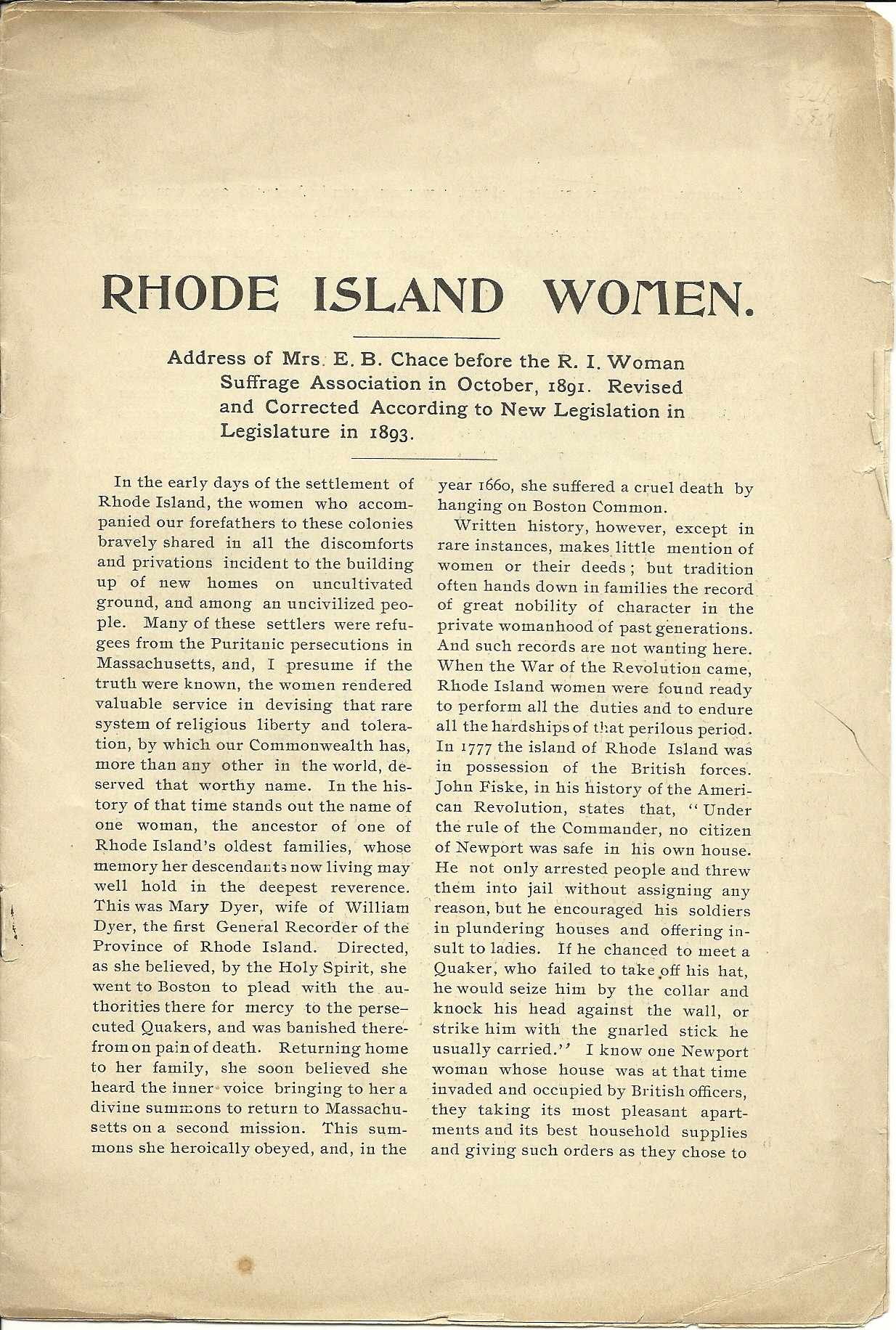
Rhode Island Women Address of Elizabeth Buffum Chace Before the Rhode Island Woman Suffrage Association in October 1891

=== 1850s ===
1850

- Paulina Wright Davis is the chair of the National Women's Rights Convention in Worcester, Massachusetts.

1852

- Anna W. Spencer publishes The Pioneer and Woman's Advocate.

1853

- Davis publishes The Una.

=== 1860s ===
1868

- October 23: Elizabeth Buffum Chace and Paulina Wright Davis attend the founding meeting of the New England Women's Suffrage Association.
- December 11: The Rhode Island Woman Suffrage Association (RIWSA) is formed by Chace and Davis.

1869

- RIWSA petitions the Rhode Island General Assembly for a women's suffrage amendment.

=== 1870s ===
1873

- Three women run unsuccessfully for school committee office: Elizabeth Churchill, Sarah Doyle, and Rhoda Peckham.

1874

- Three women are elected to the Providence School Committee: Anna E. Aldrich, Elizabeth C. Hicks and Abby D. Slocum.

=== 1880s ===
1884

- RIWSA held their annual meeting at the Old Statehouse with Susan B. Anthony and Frederick Douglass in attendance.

1885

- A women's suffrage amendment bill is introduced by Representative Edward L. Freeman in the General Assembly.

1886

- The women's suffrage amendment passes both houses of the General Assembly. It has to pass one more time to be valid.

1887

- The women's suffrage amendment again passes both houses and will now go out for a voter referendum.
- April 6: The election for the amendment is held, but it fails.
- August 11: The New England Woman Suffrage Association (NEWSA) held a conference in the Casino Theatre in Newport.

=== 1890s ===
1892

- A "special appeal" goes before the general assembly for women in Rhode Island to vote in presidential elections.

1895

- Jeanette S. French speaks at a hearing in the senate of the general assembly.

1897

- A commission to revise the state constitution is appointed by the governor.
- May 11: Suffragists present their objections to the Constitutional Committee.

== 20th century ==
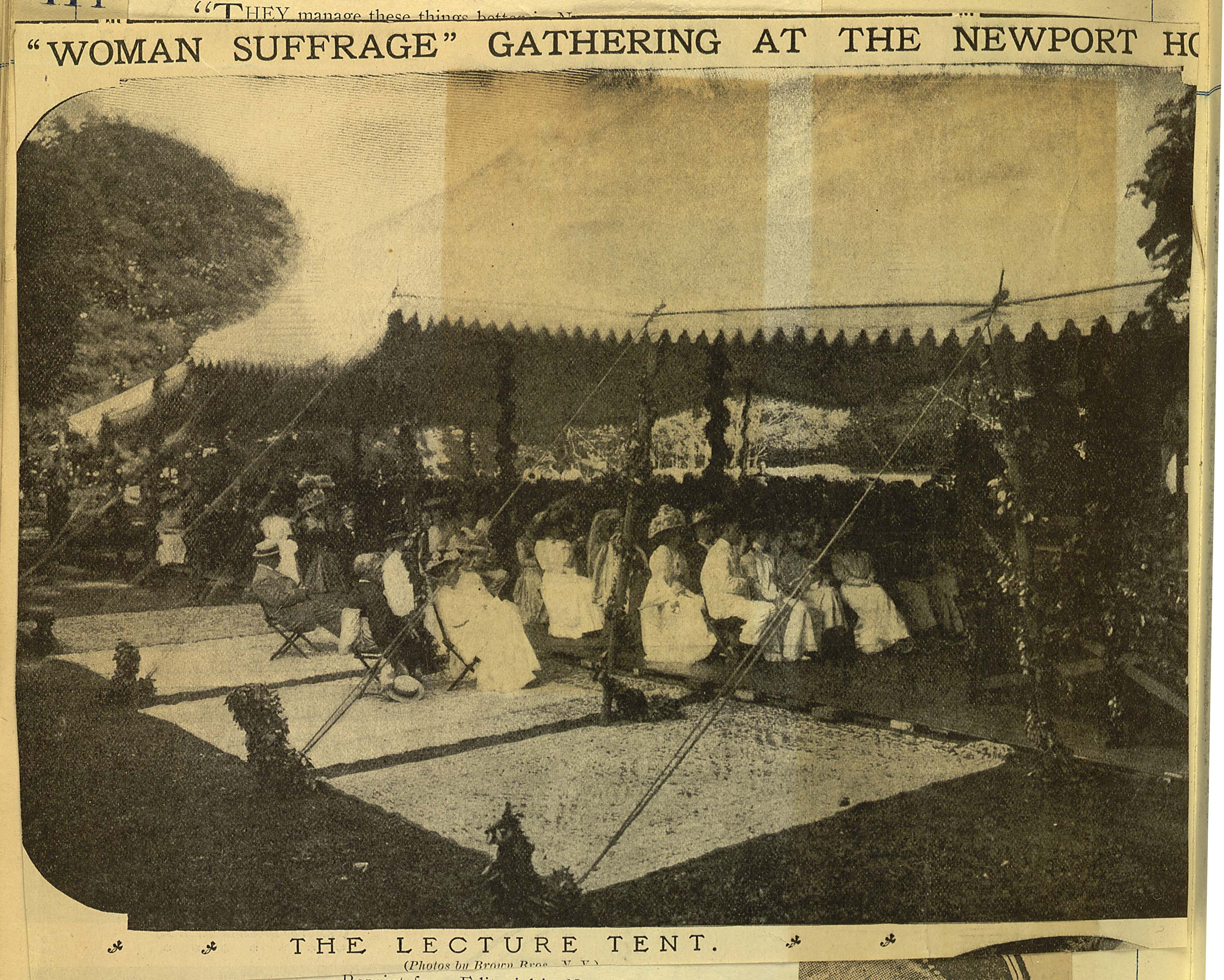
Woman suffrage gathering at the Newport Marble House of Alva Belmont on September 12, 1909

=== 1900s ===
1902

- Suffragists in Rhode Island get the endorsement of the State Central Trades and Labor Unions.

1903

- Providence Mayor, Daniel L. D. Granger, endorses women's suffrage.
- Mary H. Dickerson founds the Rhode Island Union of Colored Women's Clubs.

1907

- December: The Rhode Island College Equal Suffrage League is formed.

1908

- Cora Mitchell forms the Newport County Woman Suffrage League.

1909

- Alva Belmont hosts a series of women's suffrage lectures at the Marble Palace.

=== 1910s ===
1912

- A branch of the Rhode Island Association in Opposition to Woman Suffrage is formed in Newport.

1913

- The Rhode Island Women's Suffrage Party is created.
- Bertha G. Higgins convinces the Rhode Island Union of Colored Women's Clubs to endorse women's suffrage.

1914

- Alva Belmont holds the Conference of Great Women at the Marble House.

1915

- The Rhode Island Women's Suffrage Party, RIWSA, and the Rhode Island College Equal Suffrage League merge to form the Rhode Island Equal Suffrage Association.
- September 15: Rhode Island suffragists, Ingeborg Kindstedt and Maria Kindberg, accompany Sara Bard Field on a cross country trip by car.

1914

- Wife of Governor Charles Warren Lippitt, Margaret Farnum Lippitt, testifies against women's presidential suffrage at the Senate General Assembly.

1916

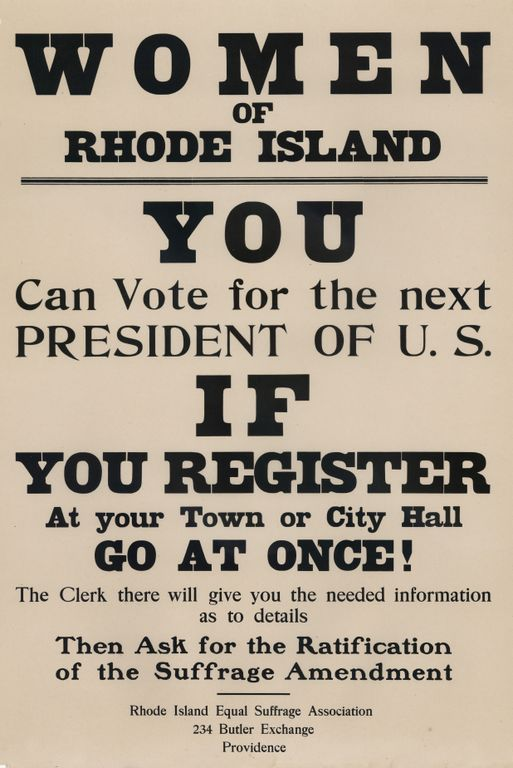
"Women of Rhode Island You Can Vote for the Next President" 1917 broadside

- February 17: A luncheon at the Naragansett Hotel is held in honor of Carrie Chapman Catt.
- March 6: The Congressional Union of Providence, Rhode Island is formed.
- The Rhode Island Union of Colored Women's Clubs endorses a federal suffrage amendment.

1917

- February 8: Another presidential suffrage bill is introduced.
- April 11: The presidential bill passes the general assembly Senate.
- April 17: The presidential suffrage bill passes both houses.
- April 18: Governor Robert Livingston Beeckman signs the presidential suffrage bill.

=== 1920s ===
1920

- January 6: Rhode Island ratifies the Nineteenth Amendment.
- October 8: The League of Women Voters of Rhode Island is created.

1928

- Rhode Island abolishes the requirement of property-owning being tied to suffrage.

== See also ==
- List of Rhode Island suffragists
- New England Woman Suffrage Association
- Women's suffrage in Rhode Island
- Women's suffrage in the United States
