= Women's suffrage in Rhode Island =

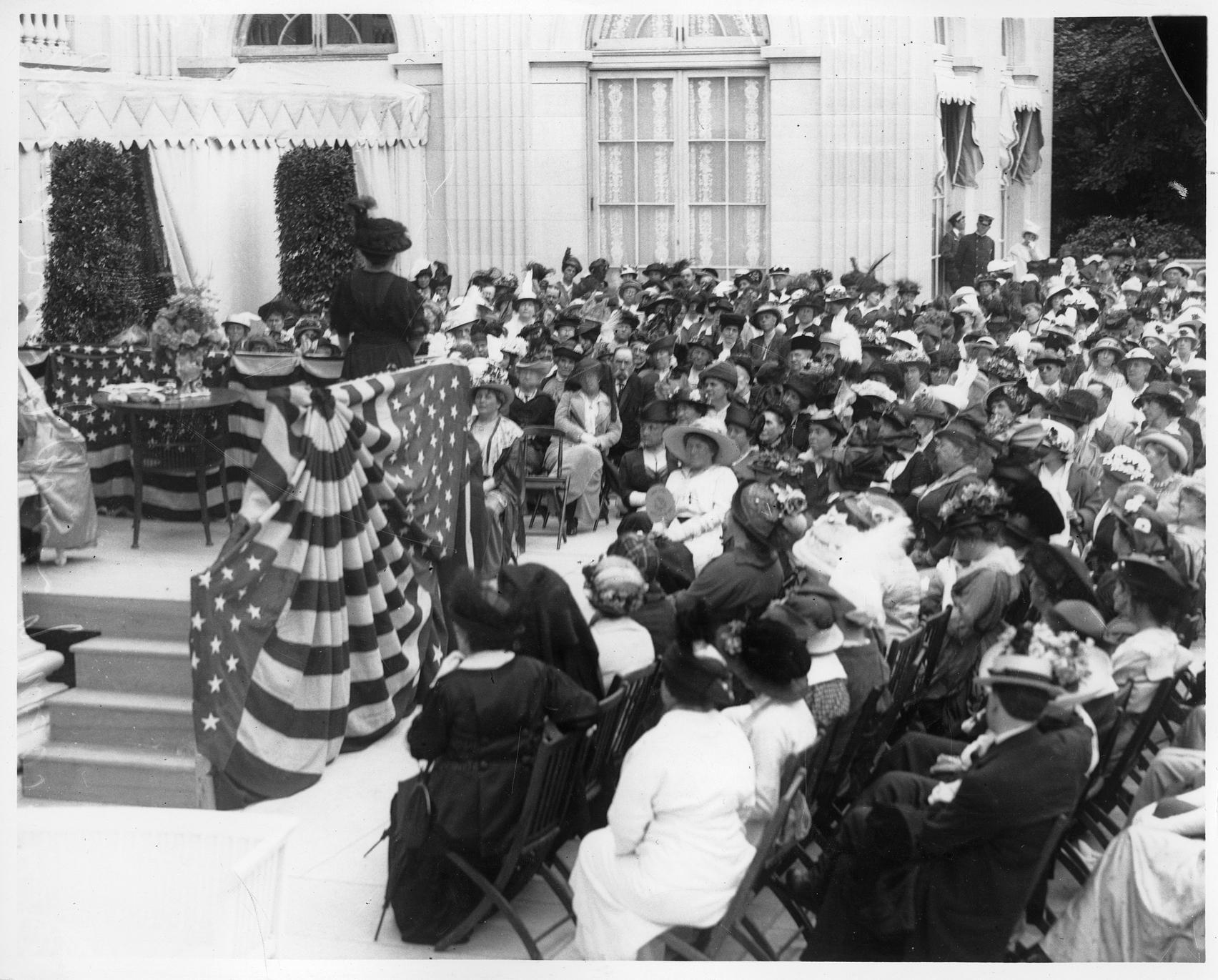
Suffrage meeting at Alva Belmont's Marble House in Newport.

Even before women's suffrage efforts took off in Rhode Island, women were fighting for equal male suffrage during the Dorr Rebellion. Women raised money for the Dorrite cause, took political action and kept members of the rebellion in exile informed. An abolitionist, Paulina Wright Davis, chaired and attended women's rights conferences in New England and later, along with Elizabeth Buffum Chace, founded the Rhode Island Women's Suffrage Association (RIWSA) in 1868. This group petitioned the Rhode Island General Assembly for an amendment to the state constitution to provide women's suffrage. For many years, RIWSA was the major group providing women's suffrage action in Rhode Island. In 1887, a women's suffrage amendment to the state constitution came up for a voter referendum. The vote, on April 6, 1887, was decisively against women's suffrage.

Women's suffrage efforts in Rhode Island continued to fight on, despite setbacks. The suffrage movement gained more publicity from Alva Belmont, who hosted a well-attended series of lectures at her Marble House mansion in 1909. Belmont, who also funded the work of Alice Paul, helped initiate a 1915 cross-country trip to deliver a petition to President Woodrow Wilson and Congress. Driving and working as the mechanic on that trip were two Swedish-American suffragists from Rhode Island. In 1913, the Rhode Island Union of Colored Women's Clubs, at the urging of Bertha G. Higgins, became the largest women's group to endorse women's suffrage in the state. In 1915, pro-suffrage governor, Robert Livingston Beeckman, helped initiate the efforts to pass a presidential suffrage bill. The bill passed in 1917, allowing women to be able to vote for the first time in Rhode Island, even if it was on a limited basis. On January 6, 1920, Rhode Island became the twenty-fourth state to ratify the Nineteenth Amendment.

== Early efforts ==
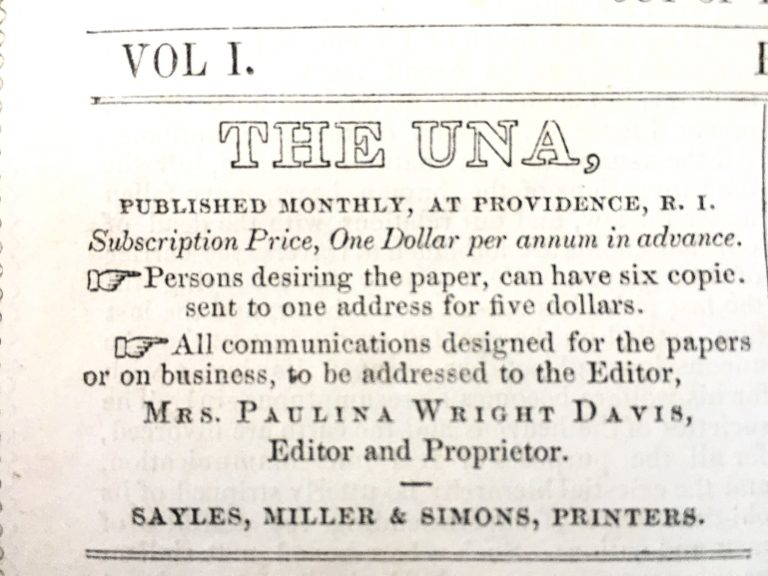
Excerpt from The Una, women's rights publication in Rhode Island.

Women in Rhode Island were involved in fighting for suffrage for men during the Dorr Rebellion. Even though the rebellion was a call for equal suffrage for men, women were very involved in "political agitation on behalf of disenfranchised males." Women founded "Dorrite societies" to promote reforms to male suffrage in the state. They also made up half of the public suffrage meetings held for the cause. Several women had significant roles both during and after the rebellion, including Francis Harriet Whipple Green, Almira Howard, Abby Lord, Ann Parlin, and Catherine Williams. Parlin asserted the right of women to criticize the government. Williams corresponded with Thomas Dorr and provided him with information. Women also served as contact points between the exiled Dorrite men.

Women were also leaders and active participants in Rhode Island politics through the abolitionist movement. Paulina Wright Davis was an abolitionist who moved to Providence. In 1850 Davis was the chair of the National Women's Rights Convention in Worcester, Massachusetts. Davis gave the opening address of the convention. She also began to publish The Una, a newspaper supporting women's rights in 1853.

During the Civil War, women throughout Rhode Island became involved with organizations to aid the war effort. One group involved in the war effort was the Providence Ladies Volunteer Relief Association. This organization, along with other similar groups in the city, organized volunteers working to support the war effort and ensured that soldiers and hospitals were adequately supplied.

On October 23, 1868, suffragists, Elizabeth Buffum Chace and Davis, attended the organizational meeting of the New England Woman's Suffrage Association (NEWSA). The women came back from the meeting inspired to create the Rhode Island Women's Suffrage Association (RIWSA), which formed on December 11, 1868. RIWSA was affiliated with NEWSA. Members of RIWSA immediately began work on petitioning the Rhode Island General Assembly for a women's suffrage amendment to the state constitution. Clubwomen and members of the Rhode Island Women's Christian Temperance Union worked together to help influence laws to protect women in the state. In 1884, the Rhode Island General Assembly voted to allow RIWSA to hold a women's suffrage convention in the Old State House. At the convention, Chace urged suffragists to keep pushing forward. Speakers, such as Susan B. Anthony and Frederick Douglass also attended.

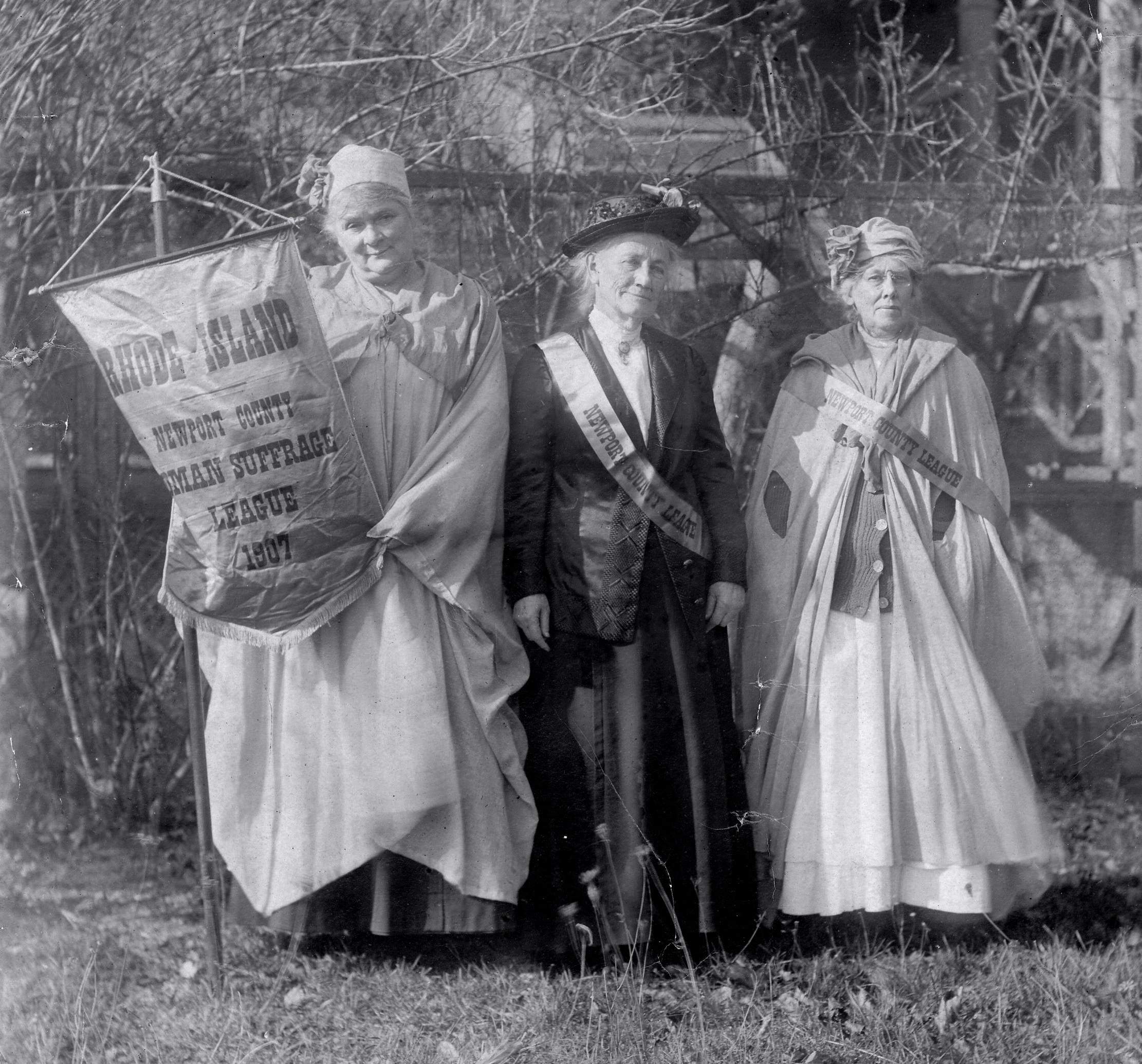
Suffragists Letitia Lawton, Cora Mitchel, and Emeline Eldredge in 1907.

Women's suffrage amendments were brought before the General Assembly for several years. In 1885, Representative Edward L. Freeman was influential in getting a bill through the Assembly. Another amendment bill passed the Assembly in 1886 and again 1887. At this point, it would go before the voters for a referendum. The suffragists only had twenty-nine days to campaign for a win. A headquarters, providing information and open twelve hours a day, was opened in Providence. Over ninety-two meetings were held during this time with well-known speakers from around the state and country. Suffragists campaigned around the state. Lillie B. Chace Wyman began to publish The Amendment to promote the amendment and women's suffrage. The vote took place on April 6, 1887, but the amendment failed by a vote of 6,889 for and 21,957 against. After the defeat of the amendment, Henry B. Blackwell suggested that suffragists in Rhode Island lobby for suffrage in presidential elections.

Before women could vote in Rhode Island, they started running for office. Due to wording in the state constitution, women were only eligible to run for school committeewoman. Elizabeth Churchill, Sarah Doyle, and Rhoda Peckham all ran in 1873, though were not successful in winning office. In 1874, Anna E. Aldrich, Elizabeth C. Hicks and Abby D. Slocum were all successful in running for seats on the Providence School Committee.

The first time the idea of presidential suffrage was brought before the General Assembly was in 1892 and it did not have much support. Blackwell brought up the idea again in 1902 and by 1903, a petition led to a bill for presidential suffrage in the Senate of the General Assembly. This bill did not leave the committee, however. Several more attempts were made to secure presidential suffrage in 1904 and 1905. In 1905, each lawmaker in the general assembly received a copy of The Woman Citizen on their desks. In 1906, the bill came before the General Assembly Senate and Senator Walter R. Stiness spoke out strongly in support of women's suffrage but it was held up in the House. Anti-suffragists testified against the presidential suffrage bill in 1907. Blackwell testified for the bill for the last time in 1909.

== More visibility ==
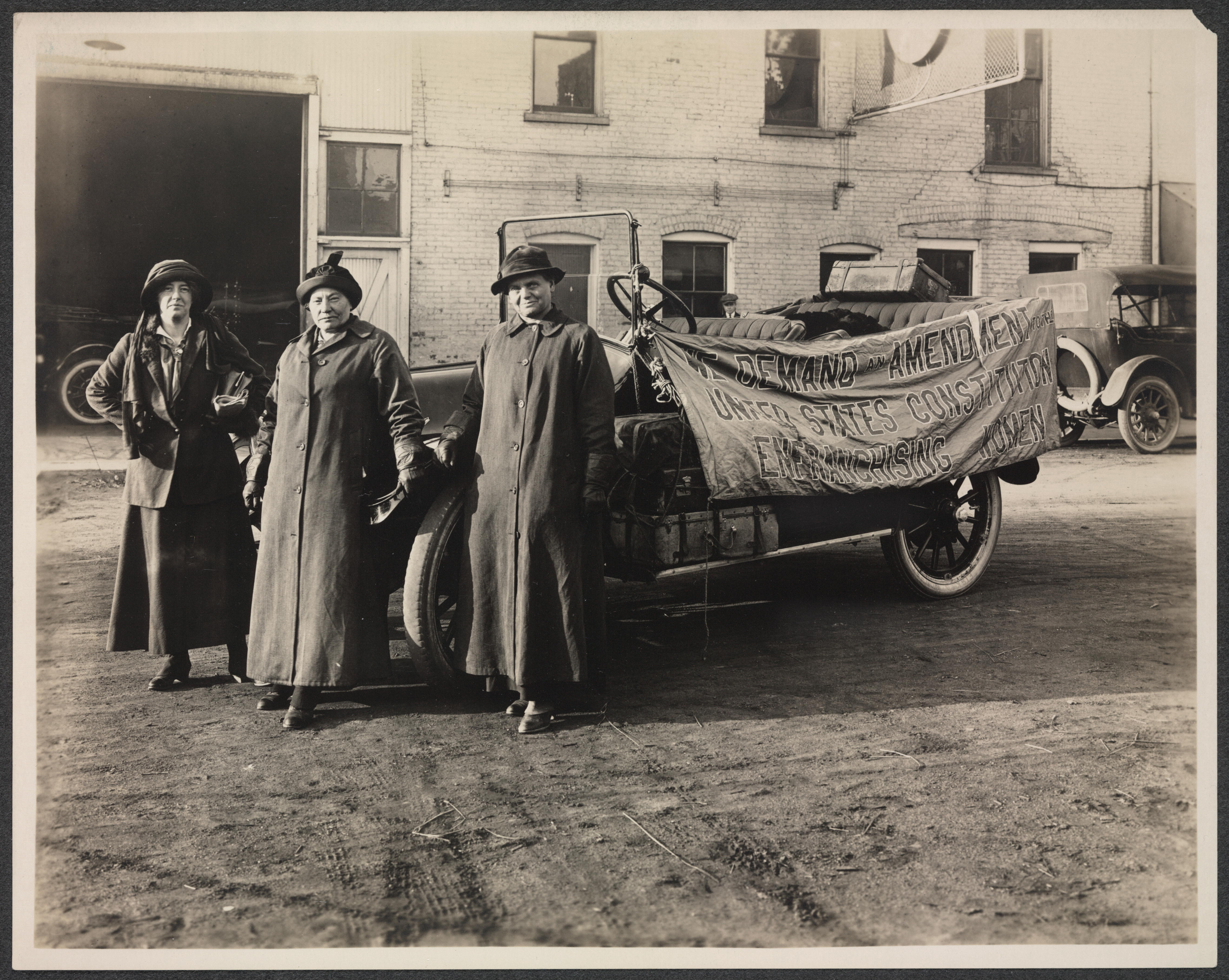
Suffrage envoy Sara Bard Field with Ingeborg Kindstedt and Maria Kindberg from Rhode Island.

Alva Belmont began to host suffrage events at her mansion, the Marble House. Around 1,000 people attended the lectures in August 1909. The speakers included Anna Howard Shaw and a ninety-year old Julia Ward Howe. It was covered "extensively" in the press. Ida Husted Harper believed that Belmont's suffrage meetings helped promote the cause of women's suffrage. The fact that the press "accounts were dignified and accurate" was important because it differed from the usual ridicule that suffragists often received.

Suffrage organizer, Louise Hall, was brought into Providence in January 1912 to work at the headquarters of the College League and State suffrage association. In 1913, Bertha G. Higgins persuaded the Rhode Island Union of Colored Women's Clubs to endorse women's suffrage after her speech at their 11th annual conference. A white suffragist, Sara Algeo, who founded the Rhode Island Woman Suffrage Party in the same year said the Union's endorsement of women's suffrage was the "only endorsement received from any large body of women in the State before ratification took place." African American women were welcome to join the Woman Suffrage Party in Rhode Island. In the fall of 1915, Algeo continued to reach out to Black women in the state through a reorganized Woman Suffrage Party group.

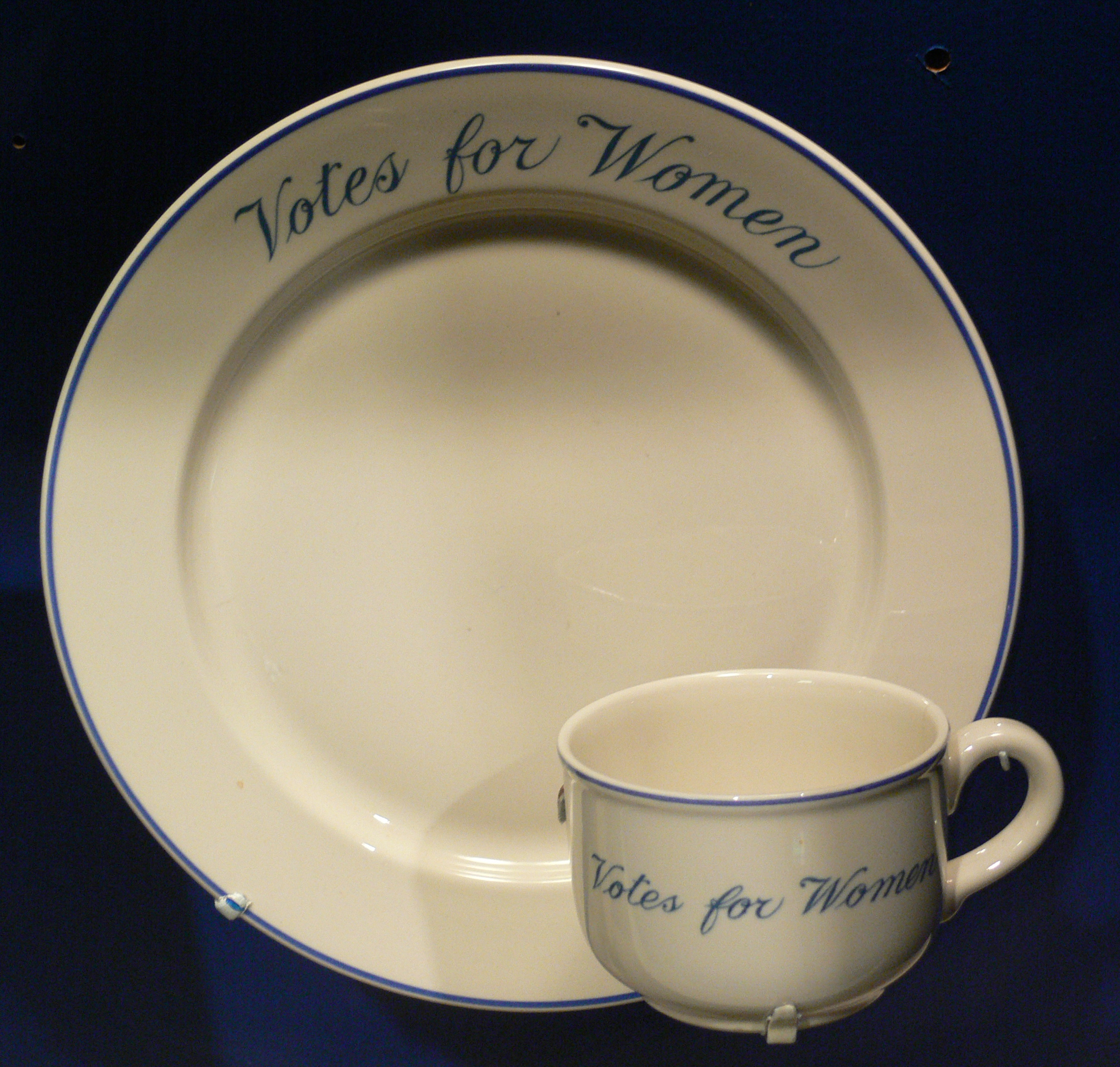
"Votes for Women" cup and plate.

Belmont held more women's suffrage speeches in 1914, this time called the Conference of Great Women. For the event, she served guests using "Votes for Women" dinnerware commissioned from John Maddock and Sons. Consuelo Vanderbilt, her daughter, spoke at the conference and people turned out to listen to her. The event helped to raise money for women's suffrage efforts.

Alva Belmont was the "primary benefactor" of Alice Paul. In 1915, Belmont, working with the Congressional Union (CU), helped Paul get a 50,000 name petition from California to the United States Congress and the President. Belmont was in contact with two Swedish-American suffragists, Ingeborg Kindstedt and Maria Kindberg who were already in San Francisco for the Women Voters Convention and were going to buy a car and drive back to Rhode Island. Kindberg purchased an Overland automobile and drove, and Kindstedt worked as the mechanic for the trip. Sara Bard Field was the CU representative and did the press events as they traveled across the country, starting out on September 15. They drove across eighteen states in all kinds of weather and delivered the petition in time by December 6. When the petition was presented to President Woodrow Wilson, he was impressed by the number of signatures gathered.

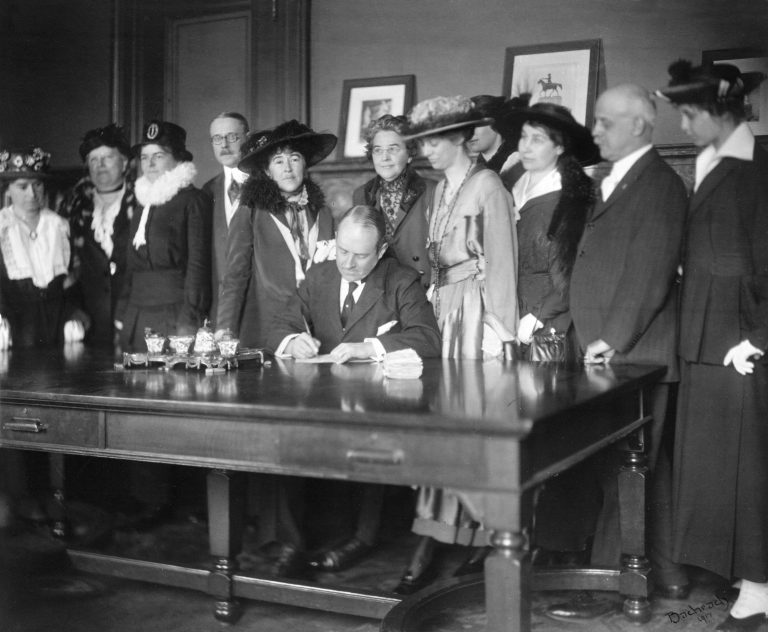
Signing women's suffrage act in Rhode Island, April 18, 1917

Governor Robert Livingston Beeckman suggested the presidential suffrage bill again in 1915. Suffragists in Rhode Island fought for the bill, bringing in legislators from states where women already had the vote to testify in front of the assembly. It was not successful, however. On February 8, 1917, the presidential suffrage bill was reintroduced in the General Assembly's Senate. Finally, the bill passed on April 17 and was signed the next day by the governor. In February and March 1917, Elizabeth Upham Yates was teaching suffrage schools at the RIESA headquarters to prepare the new women voters. In August 1917, Carrie Chapman Catt and James Henry Darlington spoke at a women's suffrage event in Newport. At the event, attended by both Black and white people, Catt and Darlington urged both men and women to continue fighting for women's suffrage.

During World War I, suffragists in Rhode Island worked to support the war effort. The war work that suffragists did helped improve their standing in the eye of the public.

Rhode Island ratified the Nineteenth Amendment on January 6, 1920. The ratification resolution was passed by a good majority in both the House and Senate of the General Assembly. Rhode Island was the twenty-fourth state to ratify the amendment. After getting the vote, places like Jamestown almost doubled their tallied votes.

== Anti-suffragism in Rhode Island ==
In October 1912, a branch of the Rhode Island Association in Opposition to Woman suffrage was formed in Newport. At the meeting, speakers emphasized that it was important to stop women's suffrage now, because it was difficult to disenfranchise women later.

The wife of Governor Charles W. Lippitt, Margaret Farnum Lippitt, was an antisuffragist. In 1914 she testified against women's suffrage at the Rhode Island General Assembly's Senate Judiciary Committee. Another member of the family, Mary Lippitt Steedman, was also opposed to women's suffrage; but later voted, became active in politics and supported the Equal Rights Amendment.

== See also ==
- List of Rhode Island suffragists
- New England Woman Suffrage Association
- Timeline of women's suffrage in Rhode Island
- Women's suffrage in the United States
