= Mary Dickerson =

Mary Dickerson may refer to:

- Mary Augusta Dickerson (also known as Mary Dickerson Donahey; 1876–1962), American author of children's books and cookbooks.
- Mary Cynthia Dickerson (1866–1923), American herpetologist
- Mary Evelyn Parker (born Mary Evelyn Dickerson; 1920–2015), Louisiana politician
- Mary H. Dickerson (1830–1914), African American businesswoman and clubwoman
- Mary Lou Dickerson (born 1946), member of the Washington House of Representatives

== See also ==
- Mary Dickinson (disambiguation)
