= Chesta Dillard Dean =

American pharmacist

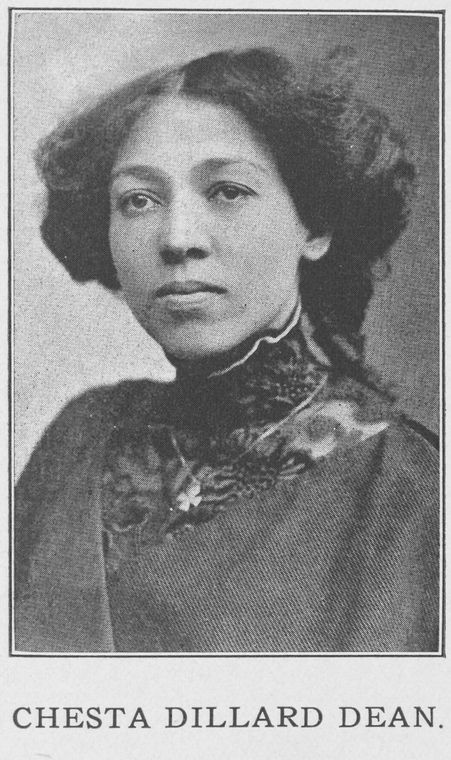
- Chesta Dean in 1912
- Born: February 12, 1885; Danville, Virginia
- Died: Unknown
- Education: Temple College, 1911
- Occupation: Pharmacist
- Relatives: Bertha G. Higgins (sister)

Chesta Dillard Dean (born February 12, 1885) was a pharmacist in Philadelphia, Pennsylvania. She was the first Black woman to open and operate a pharmacy in Philadelphia.

== Early life and education ==
Chesta Dillard was born outside of Danville, Virginia, the tenth child of Barbara Stone Dillard and Horace Dillard. After her father died, she was sent to live with an older sister, Bertha G. Higgins in Jersey City, New Jersey. She also lived with her older sister in Providence, Rhode Island, and attended a high school in Lawrenceville, Virginia.

After receiving training at St. Paul's School (Lawrenceville, Virginia), Dean attended Brown University for two years and graduated from Temple College with a Pharmacy degree in 1911.

== Career ==
Dean could not get enough hours of practice to become a registered pharmacist. Instead, she purchased a pharmacy in Philadelphia in 1911. She not only became one of only three practising Black pharmacists in Philadelphia at the time, but also became the first and only woman of colour to own and operate a pharmacy at that time. Dean's accomplishments were reported in the black "Who's Who in Philadelphia", published in 1912.
