= Northeastern Federation of Colored Women's Clubs =

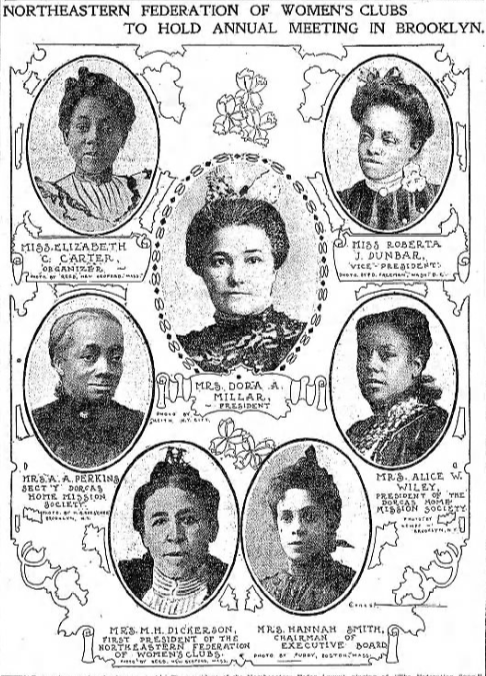
Women involved in the Northeastern Federation of Colored Women's Clubs, 1902

The Northeastern Federation of Colored Women's Clubs (NFCWC) is an umbrella organization representing black women's clubs in the northeastern United States. The organization was affiliated with the National Association of Colored Women's Clubs (NACWC). It was the first umbrella organization for black women's clubs in the United States, predating the NACWC by a month. The motto of the club is "For God and Humanity".

== About ==
Mary H. Dickerson founded an organization on June 3, 1896, under the name "New England Federation of Women's Clubs". The organization was inspired by the National Association of Colored Women's Clubs (NACWC). Two years later, the name was changed to the Northeastern Federation of Colored Women's Clubs (NFCWC) and Dickerson served as the first president. In 1899, the NFCWC withdrew their membership from the NACWC over differences in choices of officers for the group, which NFCWC felt did not best represent them. However, later, they did re-affiliate, become one of four regional groups of the NACWC.

NFCWC met annually, sending delegates who represented their local areas in New England. It comprised 55 clubs in from the northeastern part of the United States in the early 1900s.

In 1904, the NFCWC petitioned President Theodore Roosevelt to urge him to take steps against lynching. On August 12, 1904, after their annual convention, the group protested lynching and other forms of discrimination against African Americans. NFCWC also appealed to President Woodrow Wilson in 1919 to stop race riots in Chicago.

The organization was formally incorporated in New York on June 15, 1927. Headquarters for the group were set up in Newport, Rhode Island, in a building donated by Louise M. Fayerweather on September 22, 1927.
