= Mary Dickinson =

Mary Dickinson may refer to:

- Mary-Anne Dickinson, pen name of Jennifer Rowe (born 1948), Australian author
- Mary Lowe Dickinson (1839–1914), American writer and activist
- Mary Norris Dickinson (1740–1803), American land and estate owner and manager

== See also ==
- Mary Dickerson (disambiguation)
