= Caroline Healey Dall =

American feminist writer, transcendentalist, and reformer

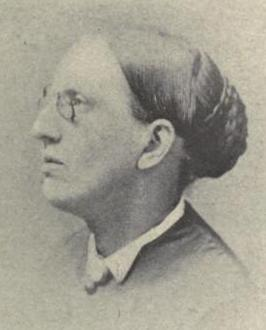
- Portrait of Caroline Healey Dall, ca.1872
- Born: Caroline Wells Healey; June 22, 1822; Boston, Massachusetts, U.S.
- Died: December 17, 1912 (aged 90); Washington D.C., U.S.
- Other name: Caroline Healey Dall
- Occupations: Writer and Reformer
- Known for: Participation in the Women's Rights Movement and Transcendentalism
- Spouse: Charles Henry Appleton Dall (m. 1844)
- Children: 2

Caroline Wells Dall (née Healey; June 22, 1822 – December 17, 1912) was an American feminist writer, transcendentalist, and reformer. She was affiliated with the National Women's Rights Convention, the New England Women's Club, and the American Social Science Association. Her associates included Elizabeth Peabody and Margaret Fuller, as well as members of the Transcendentalist movement in Boston.

== Biography ==
=== Early life and education ===
Caroline Wells Healey was born and raised in Boston, Massachusetts, daughter of Mark Healey, a merchant and investor, and his wife, Caroline (née Foster) Healey. She lived there off and on during her life. As a young woman, she received a comprehensive education, encouraged by her father to write novels and essays, and to engage in debates about religion, philosophy and politics. In addition to private tutoring, she attended a private school for girls run by educator Joseph Hale Abbot, until the age of fifteen.

In the fall of 1842, Healey taught at Lydia S. English's Female Seminary (later known as the Georgetown Female Seminary). Over Christmas 1842, a Unitarian minister from Baltimore, Charles Henry Appleton Dall, came to fill an open pulpit in Georgetown. Healey initially found Dall unappealing and she was shocked when he proposed to her by letter months later. But after a few weeks of correspondence, she accepted his proposal, resigned her teaching position, and moved to Baltimore.

She married Dall in 1844. The two lived in Toronto during the early 1850s, and returned to Boston in 1855. Her children included William Healey Dall, in whose Washington D.C. home she lived her later years.

=== Work for women's rights ===
Although she continued to write through the early years of her marriage and child-rearing, after her husband moved to Calcutta, India to perform missionary work, Dall became an active participant in the Boston Women's Rights movement. She was soon an active lecturer and writer on the topic, and organized the New England Women's Rights Convention, along with suffragist Paulina Wright Davis. Also with Davis, she founded The Una, a journal devoted to woman's rights, and the pioneer publication of its kind.

After deciding that she did not like working with groups, Dall turned to writing as her principal means of addressing women's equality. her most prominent works from this time included Historical Pictures Retouched: a Volume of Miscellanies (1861), which highlighted previously ignored women in history, and a collection of lectures entitled The College, the Market, and the Court; or Woman's Relation to Education, Labor, and Law (1867) in which she argued that the modern woman was no longer content to be in the domestic sphere and should be allowed to participate in public life. The New York Evening Post called this collection "the most eloquent and forcible statement of the Woman's Question which has been made." Dall was a founder of the Social Science Association (1865).

Dall was seen as too conservative by Parker Pillsbury who dismissed her 1860 effort to form a new women's rights faction in Boston with discussion "limited to the subjects of Education, Vocation and Civil Position" rather than more challenging topics such as divorce. Pillsbury said the meeting was "parlor theatricals" and "harmless". Susan B. Anthony wrote, "Cautious, careful people, always casting about to preserve their reputation and social standing, never can bring about a reform."

=== Later life ===
In the late 1860s, Dall retired from the Women's Rights movement and turned her writing attention to such diverse topics as Egypt (Egypt's Place in History 1868) and the Civil War (Patty Gray's Journey, three volumes for children, 1869–70). During this time, she also moved to Washington, D.C., where she became a friend of the current first lady Frances Cleveland.

Much of her later work was about the American Renaissance to which she was witness as a young woman. Works from this period include Margaret and Her Friends: Ten Conversations with Margaret Fuller (1895) and Transcendentalism in New England: a Lecture (1897), given to the Society of Philosophical Inquiry at the age of 73. During this time, she also gave the occasional sermon in the Unitarian church, one of the earliest women to do so. In the last years of her life, she suffered greatly from arthritis, though she remained active until her death at the age of 90 on December 17, 1912.

== Works ==
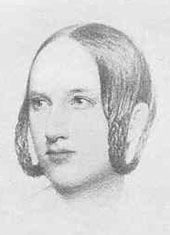
Portrait of Caroline Wells Healey Dall, by Alvan Clark, ca.1836

- Essays and Sketches, Boston: S.G. Simpkins, 1849
- Woman's Right to Labor, or, Low Wages and Hard Work: In Three Lectures, delivered in Boston, November, 1859, Boston: Walker, Wise, and Co., 1860, ISBN 9781425516628
- Woman's Rights Under the Law: in Three Lectures, Delivered in Boston, January, 1861, Boston: Walker, Wise and Company, 1861
- The College, the Market, and the Court: or, Woman's Relation to Education, Labor, and Law. [1867] Boston: Rumford Pres, 1914.
- The Life of Dr. Anandabai Joshee: A Kinswoman of the Pundita Ramabai. Boston: Roberts Brothers, 1888.
- Transcendentalism in New England, Boston: Roberts Brothers, 1897
- Selected Journals of Caroline Healey Dall. Helen R. Deese (ed.)
  - Volume 1: 1838–1855. Boston: Massachusetts Historical Society, 2006.
  - Volume 2: 1855–1866. Boston: Massachusetts Historical Society, 2013.
