= Martha H. Mowry =

American physician (1818–1899)

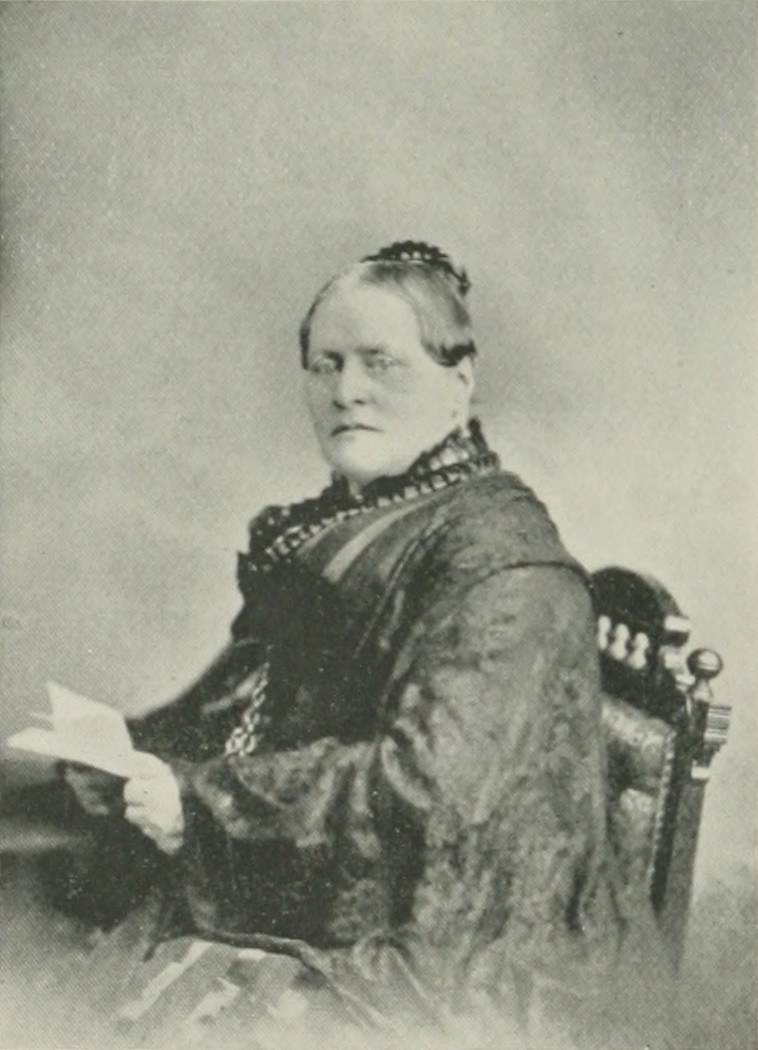
- Portrait of Mowry from "A Woman of the Century" (1893)
- Born: June 7, 1818; Providence, Rhode Island; United States of America
- Died: August 29, 1899 (aged 81); Providence, Rhode Island
- Education: Female Medical College of Pennsylvania; Doctor of Medicine 1853
- Occupations: physician, activist
- Organization: Association for the Advancement of Women
- Known for: First woman physician in Rhode Island

Martha H. Mowry (June 7, 1818 – August 29, 1899) was an American physician and the first woman physician in the U.S. state of Rhode Island. She was also an advocate for women's suffrage and human welfare reform.

== Early life and education ==
=== Early life ===
Martha Harris Mowry was born in Providence, Rhode Island, on June 7, 1818. Her parents were Thomas (died June 1872) and Martha Harris Mowry (died August 1818). Her mother died when Martha was eight weeks old. Her father was a merchant in Providence. Mowry was raised by her paternal aunt, Amey Mowry, who reportedly inspired in her niece a fondness for literature, science and academic study.

Mowry attended the schools of Miss Sterry and Miss Chace in Providence, and in 1825, she was sent to an academy in care of a Mrs. Walker, the widow of a Methodist minister. In 1827, she became a student in the Friends' Yearly Meeting Boarding School in Providence, where she remained until 1831. She next went to Miss Latham's select boarding-school, and later to Miss Winsor's young ladies' boarding-school. While in that school, she was reportedly prostrated by fright and overexertion after being pursued by strange men so that she and two other girls were obliged to run a distance of a mile and a quarter to reach the school. Heart debility, aggravated by this, retarded her progress four years. During those years, she studied mathematics, Latin, Greek and Hebrew. She also read extensively, especially the works of the ancient philosophers.

After leaving the school, Mowry kept up her studies, with increasing interest in languages and Asian literature. Later, she was a student in the Green Street Select School in Providence while Margaret Fuller was a teacher there. After leaving school, she continued her studies outside of a formal setting while overseeing her father's household.

=== Medical education ===
In 1844, heeding suggestions of physicians who, had noticed her interest in anatomy and physiology and cognate branches, Mowry began to study medicine. In the mid-nineteenth century, institutional sexism barred many women from entering professional medical practice, and there is little evidence suggesting Mowry had formed the intention of publicly practicing medicine at this time. Mowry was encouraged in her study by several physicians, including Doctors Briggs, Fabyan, Fowler and Mauran, and had access to their medical libraries. She then studied under the direction of Doctor De Bonneville and his wife, who were professors in magnetism, and he in homeopathy, and when they moved away from Providence in 1849, they gave her a testimonial expressing their confidence in her ability to treat diseases.

In the winter of 1849-50, Mowry was requested to take charge of a medical college for women in Boston, Massachusetts. She spent some months in close study, to fit herself for work, and under the instruction of able and experienced physicians, such as Dr. Cornell, Dr. Page, Dr. Gregory and others, she soon became proficient.

== Career ==
About 1850, Mowry spent six months in close study in Boston, under the supervision of Doctor Cornell. About that time, Doctor Paige came to Providence as a lecturer and instructor in electropathy, and formed a class for instruction. She joined that class, also took private lessons, and eventually earned a diploma for faithful study and attainment. By special requests of her friends, she subsequently gave many lectures before physiological societies and in different villages. In recognition of such services, she received a silver cup from the Providence Physiological Society, and later mementoes from other societies.

In 1853, Mowry was visited by a committee from the Female Medical College of Pennsylvania in Philadelphia, which had been founded in 1850. Among the committee were Lydia Maria Child and Lucretia Mott. Without making the purpose of their visit known to Mowry, and in the course of an informal interview with her, investigated her knowledge of allopathic medical subjects until they were satisfied of her knowledge. On their return to Philadelphia, they sent Mowry a diploma conferring upon her the degree of M.D., with signatures of the college faculty. This was followed, a week later, by an offer for a professorship of obstetrics and diseases of women and children at the Female Medical College. With reluctance, her father consented to Mowry accepting the position, and she did so, in 1853-4.

Mowry reportedly found work at the college was pleasant and successful, but she returned to Providence at the desire of her father. Her father presented her with a horse and chaise, and thereafter, for nearly 40 years, she constantly kept one or two horses in use in her visits to patients.

In 1880, Mowry partially retired from medical practice, but in 1882, she consented to resume work under limitations absolving her from going out at night except in extreme cases. She was especially interested in educating mothers.

Mowry supported women's suffrage, and appeared at a convention held in Worcester, Massachusetts, where she was introduced by Lucretia Mott. She was a trustee of the Woman's Educational and Industrial Union of Providence, a member of the Rhode Island Woman's Club, and vice-president for her State of the Association for the Advancement of Women.

== Death ==
Mowry died in Providence from apoplexy, August 29, 1899 at the age of 81.
