= The Una =

19th century feminist periodical

- "Out of great heart of nature seek we truth"
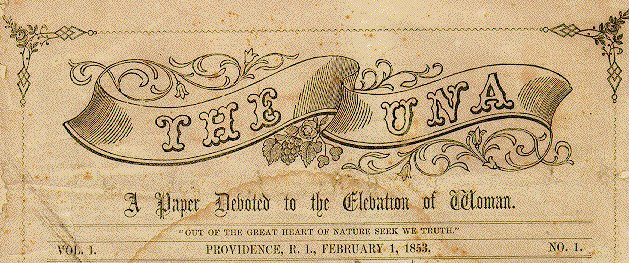
- Type: reform journal
- Founder: Paulina Wright Davis
- Associate editor: Caroline Healey Dall
- Founded: February 1, 1853
- Ceased publication: October 1855
- Language: English
- Headquarters: Providence, Rhode Island
- City: Boston, Massachusetts
- Country: US

The Una was a newspaper in the United States, recognized as one of the first feminist periodicals owned, written, and edited entirely by women. Launched in Providence, Rhode Island by Paulina Wright Davis in February 1853, it eventually relocated to Boston. "Out of great heart of nature seek we truth" was the quote in volume 1 number 1.

== History ==
In 1853, The Una, a paper devoted to the enfranchisement of woman, owned and edited by Paulina Wright Davis, was first published in Providence, Rhode Island. The Una was the first paper focused on woman suffrage, and the first distinctively woman's rights journal ever published. Its mystical name signified "truth", to be used as a constant suggestion of fidelity to all. The Una had many notable correspondents such as William H. Channing, Elizabeth Peabody, Thomas Wentworth Higginson, Rev. A. D. Mayo, Dr. William Elder, Ednah D. Cheney, Caroline H. Dall, Fanny Fern, Elizabeth Oakes Smith, Frances D. Gage, Hannah Tracy Cutler, Abby H. Price, Marion Finch, of Liverpool, Hon. John Neal, of Portland, Lucy Stone, and Elizabeth Cady Stanton. For nearly three years Davis continued The Una, doing so entirely at her own expense. It took the broadest ground claimed of that day: individual freedom in the State, the Church, and the home; woman's equality and suffrage as a natural right.

After the paper removed to the Boston publisher S. C. Hewitt, Caroline Healey Dall became associate editor, and for some time, assisted in the editorial department, where it continued to be published until October 1855. Davis viewed The Una as a reform journal, while Dall wanted to advance it as a literary journal. Its counterparts were Genius of Liberty and The Lily.

== See also ==
- Die Deutsche Frauen-Zeitung
- The Lily
- List of feminist periodicals in the United States
- List of suffragists and suffragettes
- Timeline of women's suffrage
- Women's suffrage in Rhode Island
- Women's suffrage in the United States
- Women's suffrage organizations and publications
