= Marble House =

Historic house in Rhode Island, United States

- U.S. National Register of Historic Places
- U.S. National Historic Landmark
- U.S. National Historic Landmark District – Contributing property
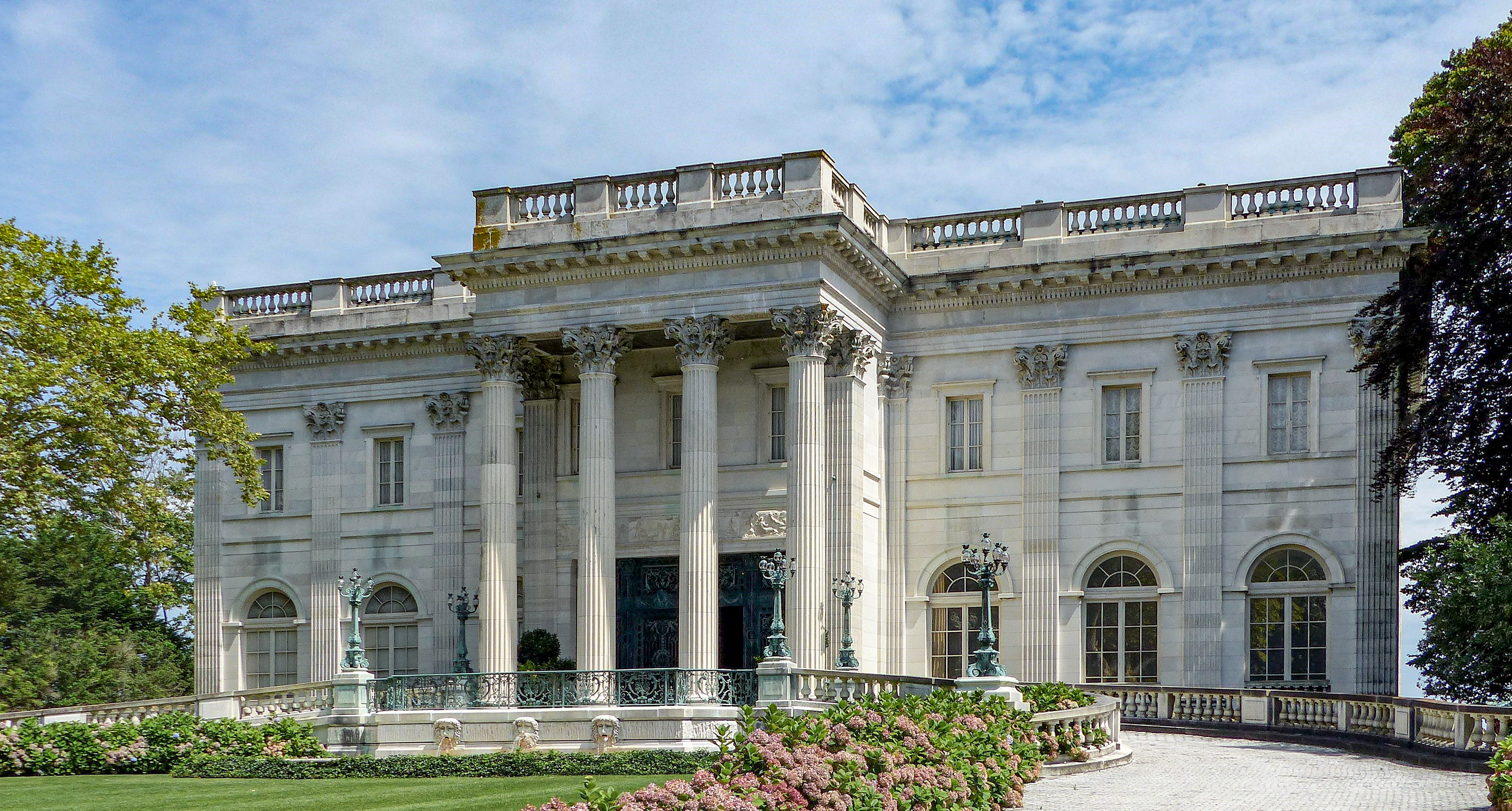
- The western facade, facing Bellevue Avenue
- Interactive map of Marble House
- Location: 596 Bellevue Avenue; Newport, Rhode Island
- Coordinates: 41°27′43″N 71°18′20″W
- Built: 1888–92
- Architect: Richard Morris Hunt
- Architectural style: Beaux Arts
- Part of: Bellevue Avenue Historic District (ID72000023)
- NRHP reference No.: 71000025

Significant dates
- Added to NRHP: September 10, 1971
- Designated NHL: February 17, 2006
- Designated NHLDCP: December 8, 1972

Marble House is a Gilded Age mansion located at 596 Bellevue Avenue in Newport, Rhode Island, United States. It was built from 1888 to 1892 as a summer cottage for Alva and William Kissam Vanderbilt and was designed by Richard Morris Hunt in the Beaux Arts style. It was unparalleled in opulence for an American house when it was completed in 1892. Its temple-front portico has been compared to that of the White House.

The house was added to the National Register of Historic Places in 1971 and was designated a National Historic Landmark in 2006. It is now open to the public as a museum run by the Newport Preservation Society.

== History ==
The mansion was built as a summer "cottage" between 1888 and 1892 for Alva and William Kissam Vanderbilt. It was a social landmark that helped spark the transformation of Newport from a relatively relaxed summer colony of wooden houses to its current image as a resort of opulent stone palaces. The fifty-room mansion required a staff of 36 servants, including butlers, maids, coachmen, and footmen. The mansion cost $11 million (equivalent to $394 million in 2025); $660 million in gold-dollar equivalence (1890 $20 double eagle gold coin) of which $7 million was spent on 500,000 cubic feet (14,000 m^{3}) of marble. Vanderbilt's older brother Cornelius Vanderbilt II subsequently built the largest of the Newport cottages, The Breakers, between 1893 and 1895.

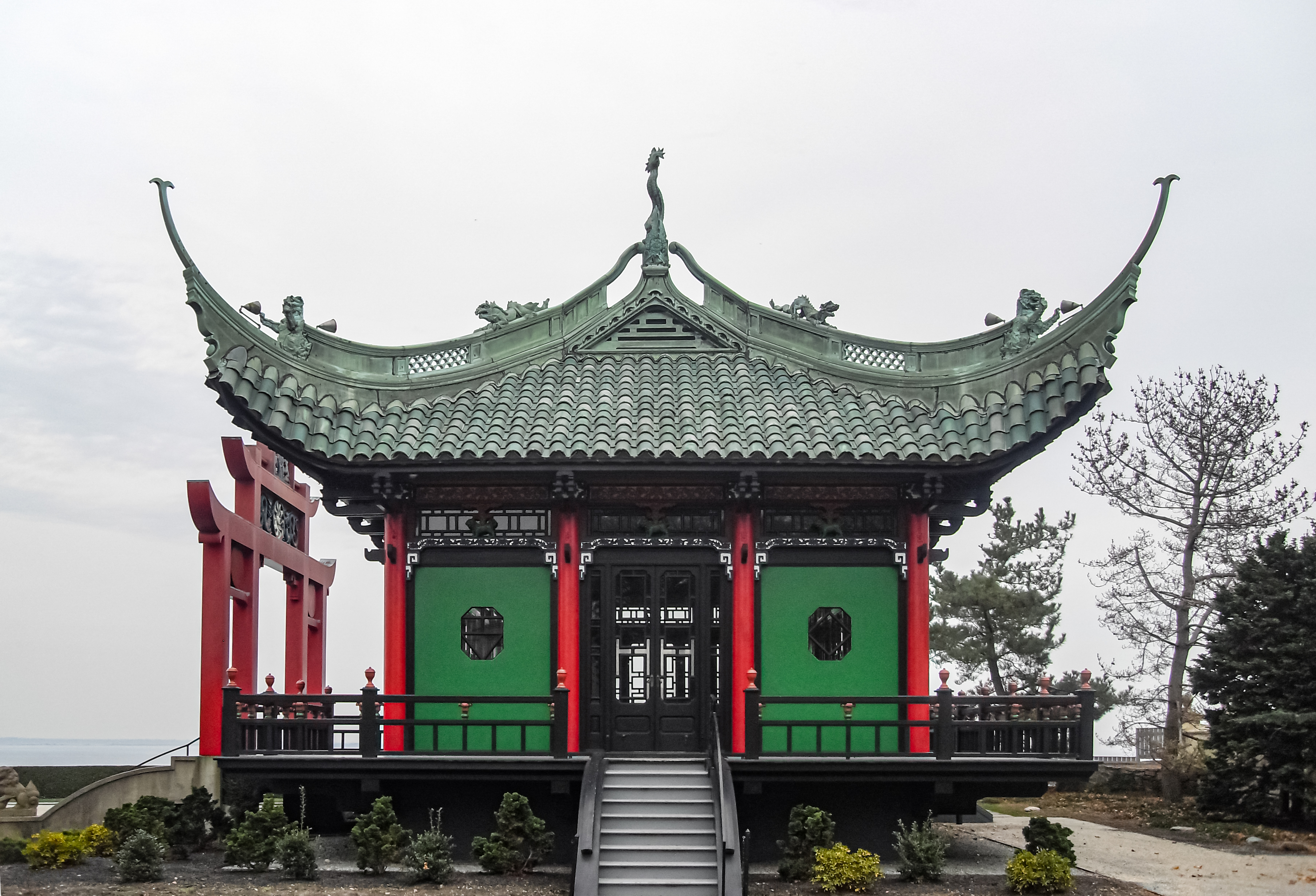
The Chinese Tea House, modeled on 12th-century Song dynasty temples

When Alva Vanderbilt divorced William in 1895, she already owned Marble House outright, having received it as her 39th birthday present. Upon her remarriage in 1896 to Oliver Hazard Perry Belmont, she relocated down the street to Belmont's mansion, Belcourt. After his death, she reopened Marble House and added the Chinese Tea House on the seaside cliff, where she hosted rallies for women's suffrage.

Alva Belmont closed the mansion permanently in 1919, when she relocated to France to be closer to her daughter, Consuelo Balsan. There she divided her time between a Paris townhouse, a villa on the Riviera, and the Château d'Augerville, which she restored. She sold the house to Frederick H. Prince in 1932, less than a year before her death. For more than 30 years, the Prince family carefully occupied the house during Newport's summer season, taking special efforts to leave the vast majority of the interior intact as the Vanderbilts had originally intended. One notable event that occurred in the Marble House during the Prince family's residency was the famed Tiffany Ball in July 1957, sponsored by Tiffany & Company and held to benefit the relatively new Preservation Society of Newport County. Continuing late into the early morning hours, the ball welcomed internationally known guests including then Senator John F. Kennedy and his wife, Jacqueline Bouvier Kennedy; Mr. and Mrs. E. Sheldon Whitehouse; the Astors; and Count Anthony and Countess Sylvia Szapary of the Vanderbilt family. During their summer occupancies, to help preserve the integrity of Marble House's famed interiors, the Princes primarily resided in smaller quarters in the building's third floor, which had formerly been used for servant housing during the Vanderbilts' time. In 1963, the Preservation Society of Newport County purchased the house from the Prince Trust, with funding provided by Harold Stirling Vanderbilt, the Vanderbilt couple's youngest son. Through the Prince Trust, the Prince family donated virtually all original furniture for the house directly to the Preservation Society.

The mansion was added to the National Register of Historic Places on September 10, 1971. The Department of the Interior designated it as a National Historic Landmark on February 17, 2006. The Bellevue Avenue Historic District, which includes Marble House and many other historic Newport mansions, was added to the Register on December 8, 1972, and subsequently designated as a National Historic Landmark District on May 11, 1976.

The mansion still stands in great visible condition and is used for many things such as guided and non-guided tours, as well as hosting various special events, parties, and weddings. The Marble House is one of the more popular tourist destinations in Newport, RI. In keeping with custom of the time, the Vanderbilts also commissioned a sizeable carriage house to be built for Marble House diagonally across Bellevue Avenue, on what is now known as Rovensky Avenue. The Carriage House abuts Rovensky Park, which is maintained by The Preservation Society of Newport County. The Carriage House property is currently privately owned and has been converted for residential use.

== Design ==
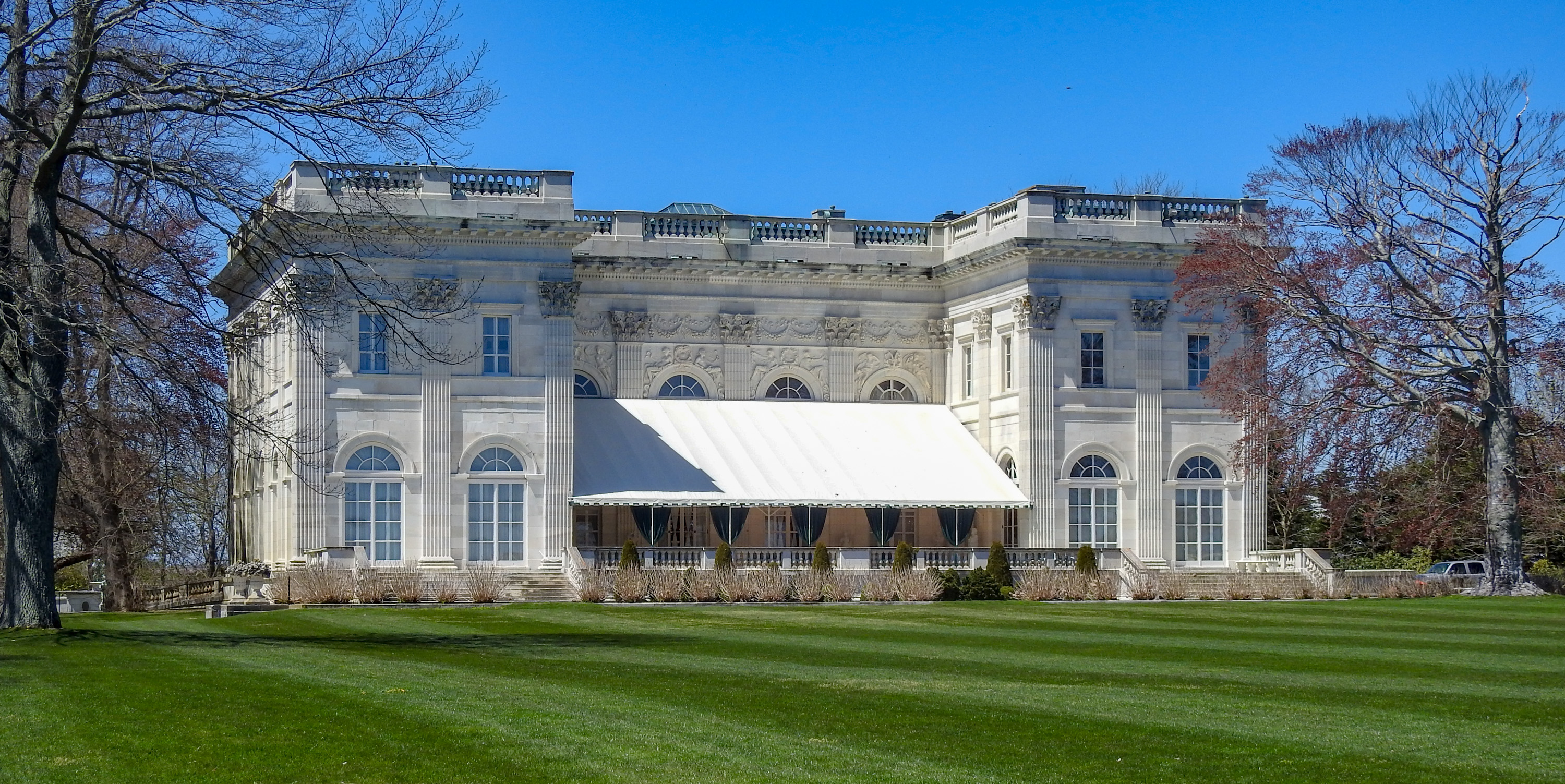
The rear facade faces towards the ocean

Marble House, one of the earliest examples of Beaux-Arts architecture in the United States, is loosely inspired by the Petit Trianon at the Palace of Versailles. Jules Allard and Sons of Paris, first hired by the Vanderbilts to design some of the interiors for their Petit Chateau on Fifth Avenue in Manhattan, designed the French-inspired interiors of Marble House. The grounds were designed by landscape architect Ernest W. Bowditch.

The mansion is U-shaped and, while it appears to be two stories, it actually has four levels: the kitchen and other service areas are located in the basement; reception rooms are on the ground floor; bedrooms are on the second floor; and servant quarters are on the concealed third floor. Load-bearing walls are brick, with their exterior sides faced in white Westchester marble, which Hunt detailed in the manner of French neoclassical architecture of the seventeenth and eighteenth centuries.

The facade of the mansion features bays that are defined by two-story Corinthian pilasters. These frame arched windows on the ground floor and rectangular ones on the second occupy most of the facade. A curved marble carriage ramp, fronted by a semi-circular fountain with grotesque masks, spans the entire western facade. The masks serve as waterspouts. The center of this facade, facing Bellevue Avenue, features a monumental tetrastyle Corinthian portico. The north and south facades match the western in basic design. The eastern facade, facing the Atlantic Ocean, is divided into a wing on each side. These wings semi-enclose a marble terrace and are surrounded by a marble balustrade on the ground floor level. The inset central portion of this facade differs from the others, with four bays of ground floor doors topped by second floor arched windows.

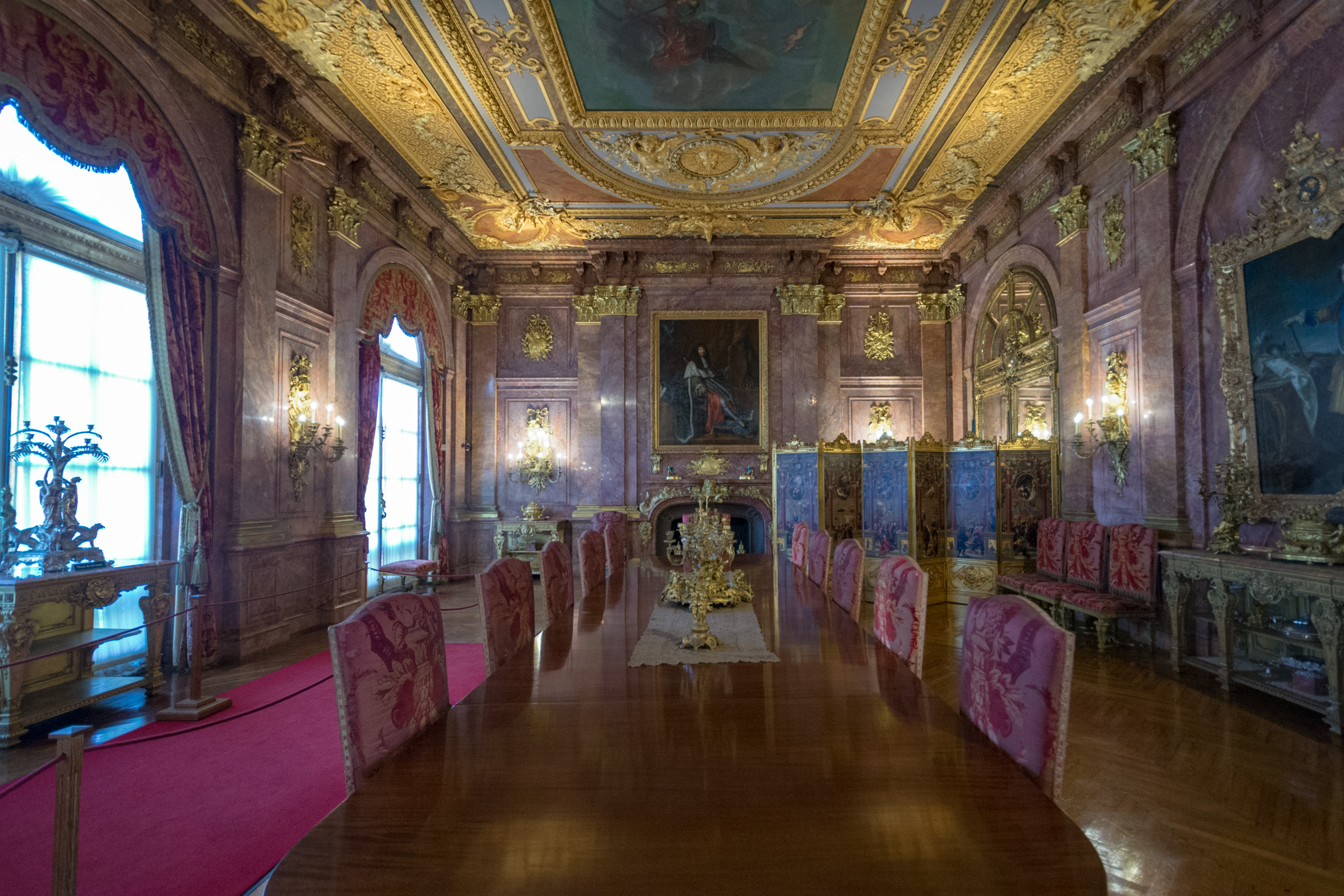
The dining room, featuring pink Numidian marble and gilt bronze capitals and trophies

The interior features a number of notable rooms. Entrance into the mansion is through one of two French Baroque-style doors, each weighing a ton and a half. Both are embellished by the monogram "WV" set into an oval medallion. They were made at the John Williams Bronze Foundry in New York. The Stair Hall is a two-story room that features walls and a grand staircase of yellow Siena marble, with a wrought iron and gilt bronze staircase railing. The railing is based on models at Versailles. An 18th-century Venetian ceiling painting featuring gods and goddesses adorns the ceiling.

Architect Richard Morris Hunt hired Giuseppe Moretti to produce the interior's marble friezes and statuary, including work on bas-reliefs of Hunt and Jules Hardouin Mansart, the master architect for Louis XIV during the construction of Palace of Versailles; and which stood side by side on the mezzanine level of the staircase. The Grand Salon, designed by Allard and Sons, served as a ballroom and reception room. Designed in the Louis XIV style, it features green silk cut velvet upholstery and draperies. The originals were made by Prelle. The walls are carved wood and gold gilt panels representing scenes from classical mythology, inspired by the panels and trophies adorning the Galerie d'Apollon at the Louvre. The ceiling features an 18th-century French painting in the manner of Pietro da Cortona depicting Minerva, with a surround adapted from the ceiling of the Queen's Bedroom at Versailles.

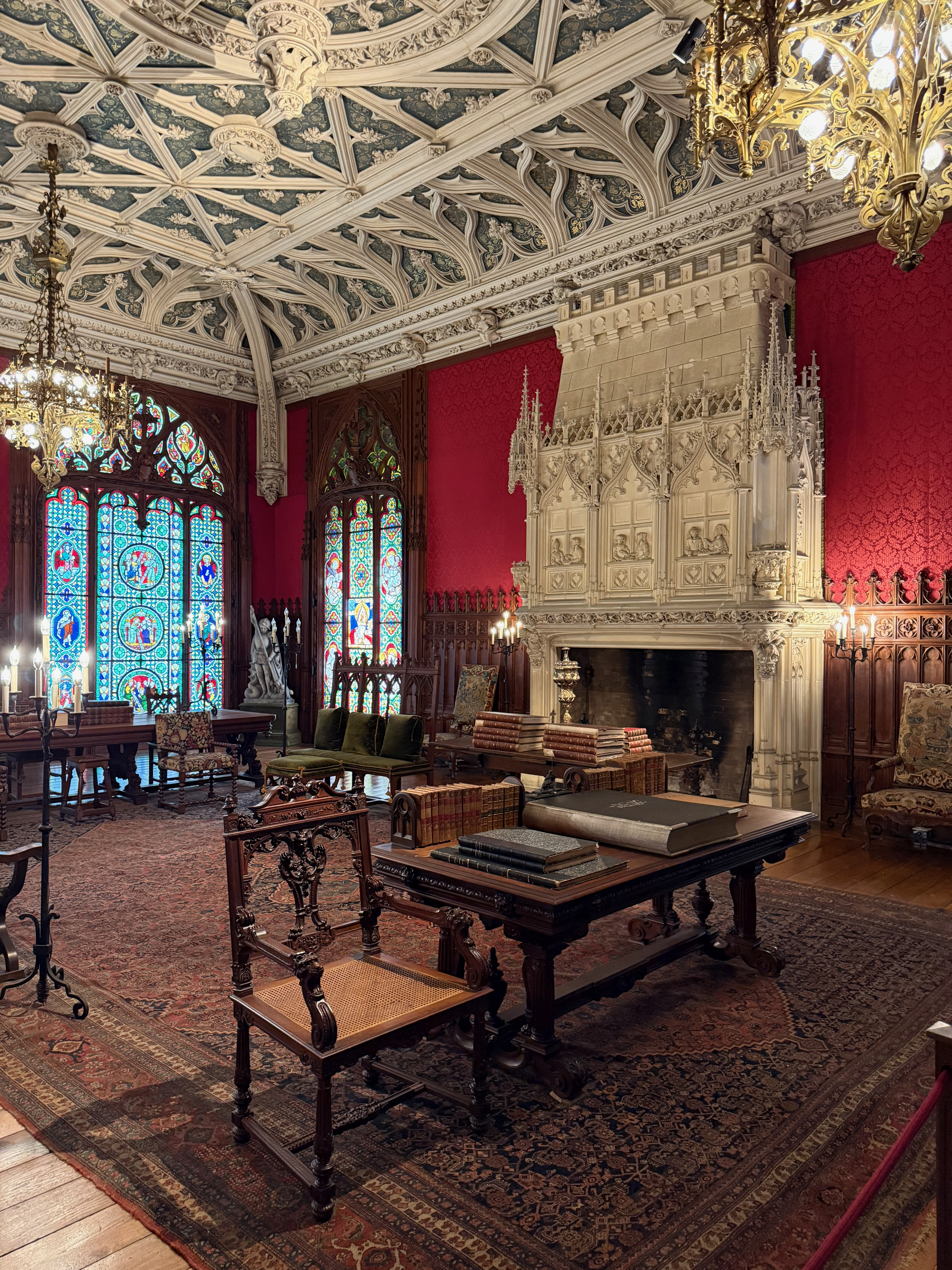
The Gothic Room in 2025

The Gothic Room, in the Gothic Revival-style, was designed to display Alva Vanderbilt's collection of Medieval and Renaissance decorative objects. The stone fireplace in the room was copied by Allard and Sons from one in the Jacques Cœur House in Bourges. The furniture was by Gilbert Cuel. The Library is in the Rococo-style. It served as both a morning room and library. The doors and bookcases, in carved walnut, were a collaboration between Allard and Cuel. The Dining Room features pink Numidian marble and gilt bronze capitals and trophies. The fireplace is a replica of the one in the Salon d'Hercule at Versailles. The ceiling is decorated painted with a hunting and fishing motif, with an 18th-century French ceiling in the center. Mrs. Vanderbilt's Bedroom, on the second floor, is in the Louis XIV style. The ceiling in this room is adorned with a circular ceiling painting of Athena, painted circa 1721 by Giovanni Antonio Pellegrini. It was originally in the library of the Palazzo Pisani Moretta in Venice.

== Filming location ==
The interiors of the mansion have appeared in several films or television series. Scenes appearing in the 1972–73 television series, America, the 1974 film, The Great Gatsby, the 1995 miniseries The Buccaneers, the 1997 film Amistad, and the 2008 film 27 Dresses were shot here. More recently, Victoria's Secret filmed one of their 2012 holiday commercials here.

== Gallery ==
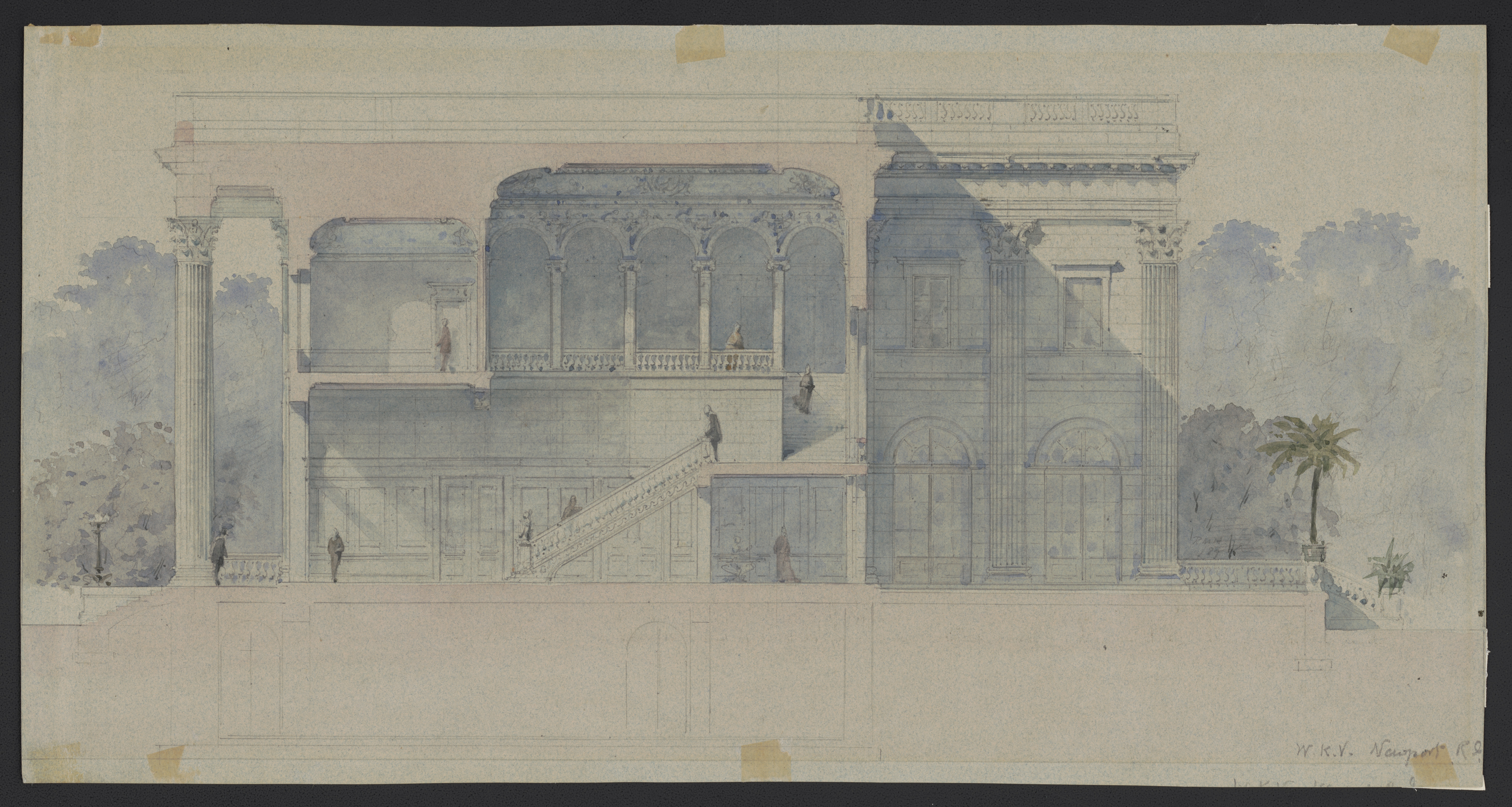
A rendered section of the building drawn by Richard Morris Hunt

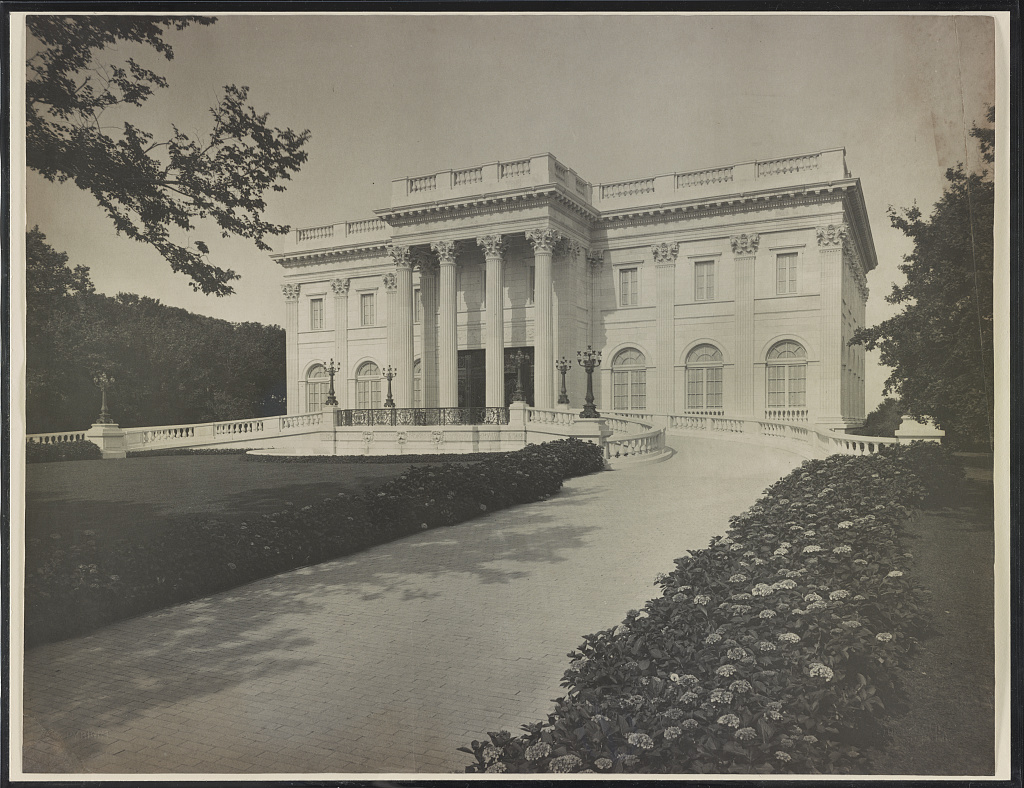
Marble House in 1895

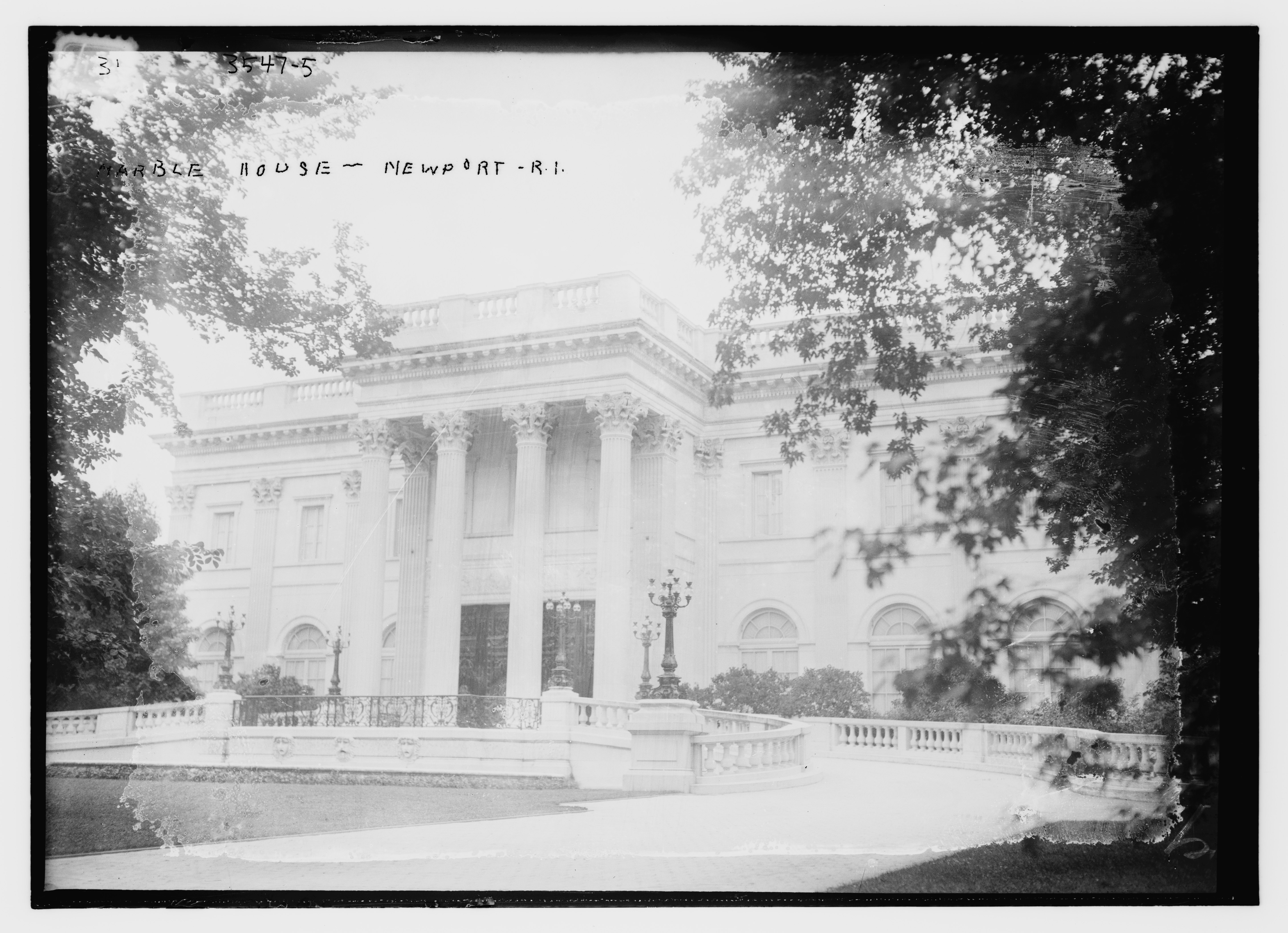
Marble House in 1910

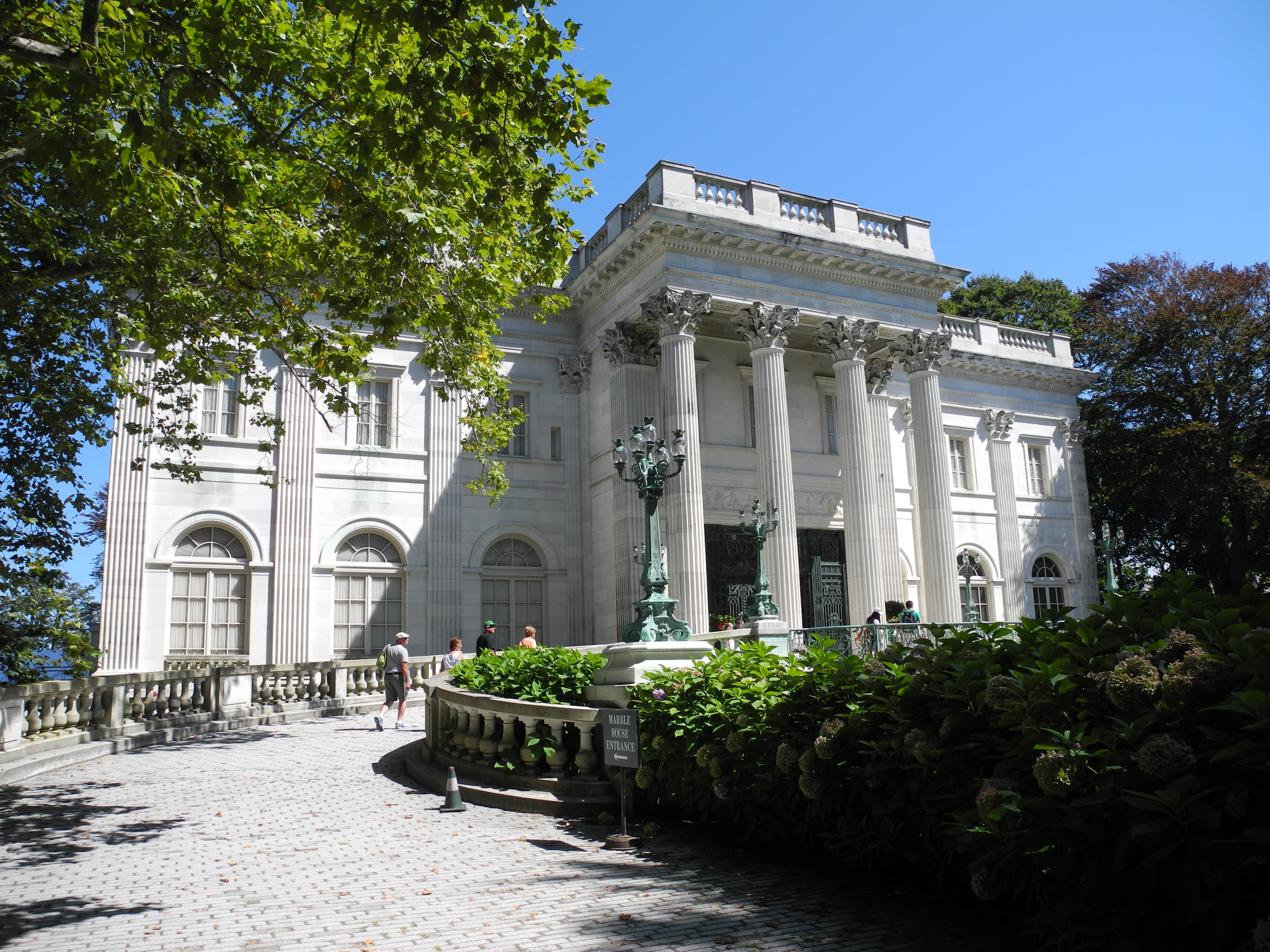
The building's front facade

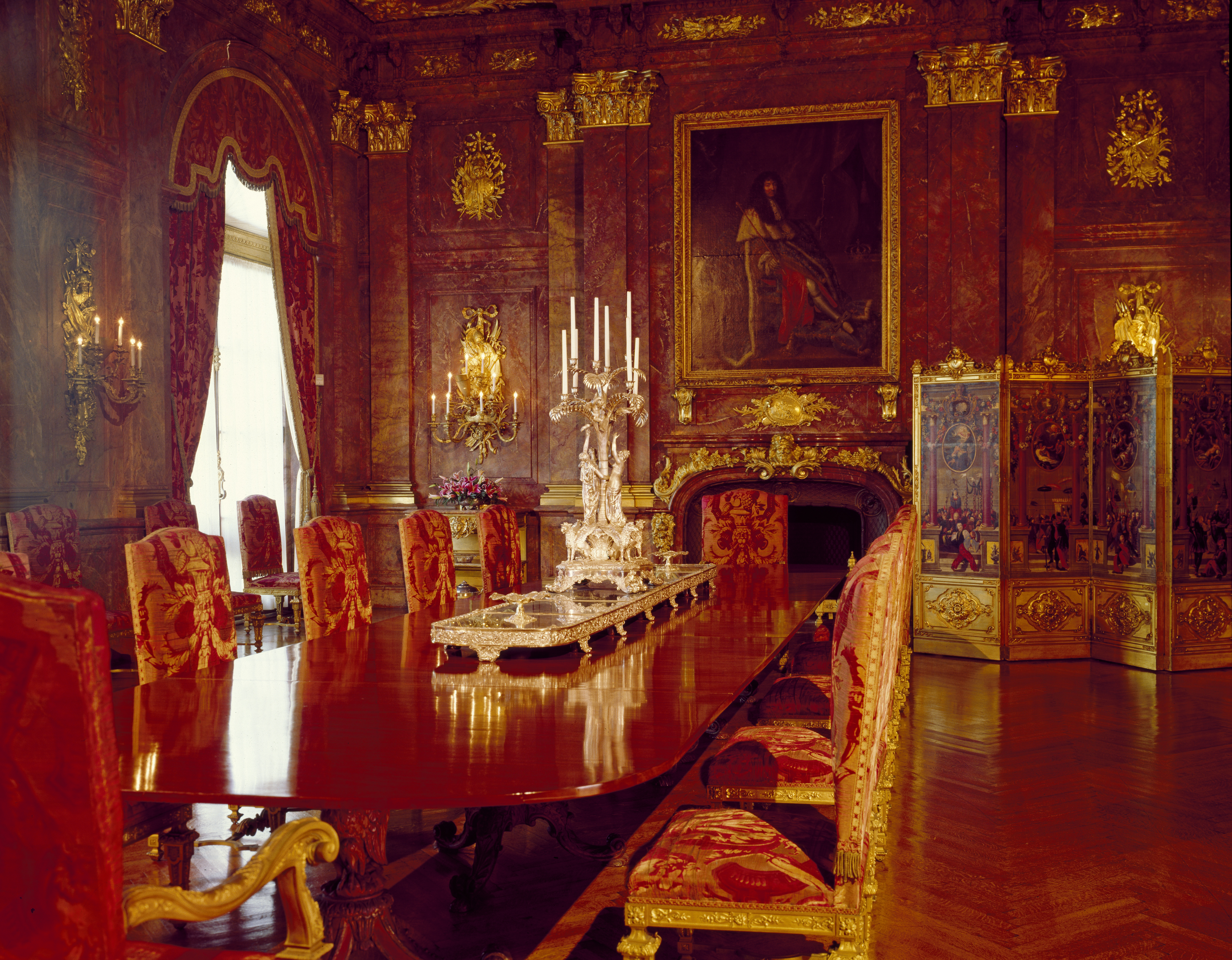
Dining Room

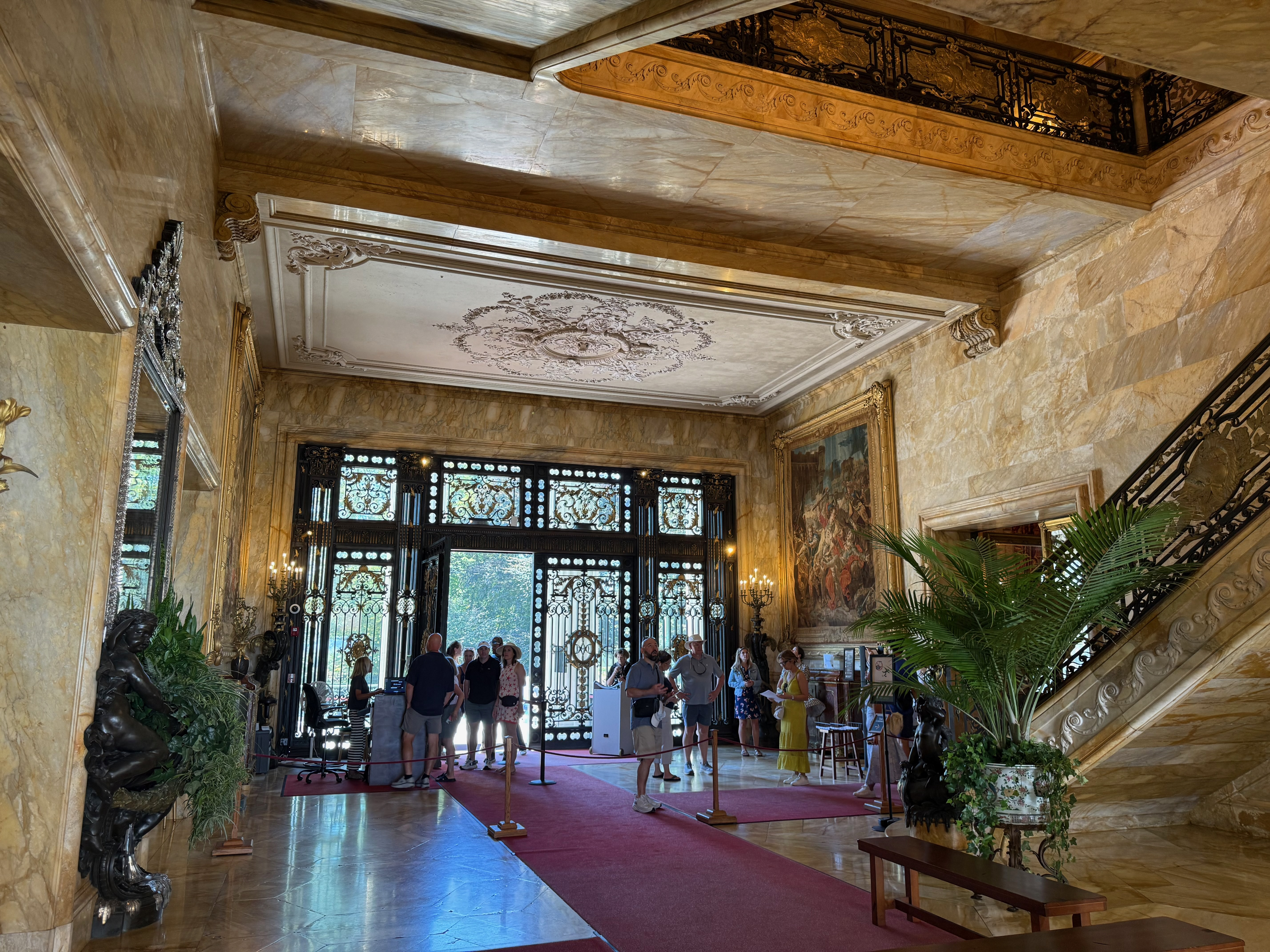
Entry hall

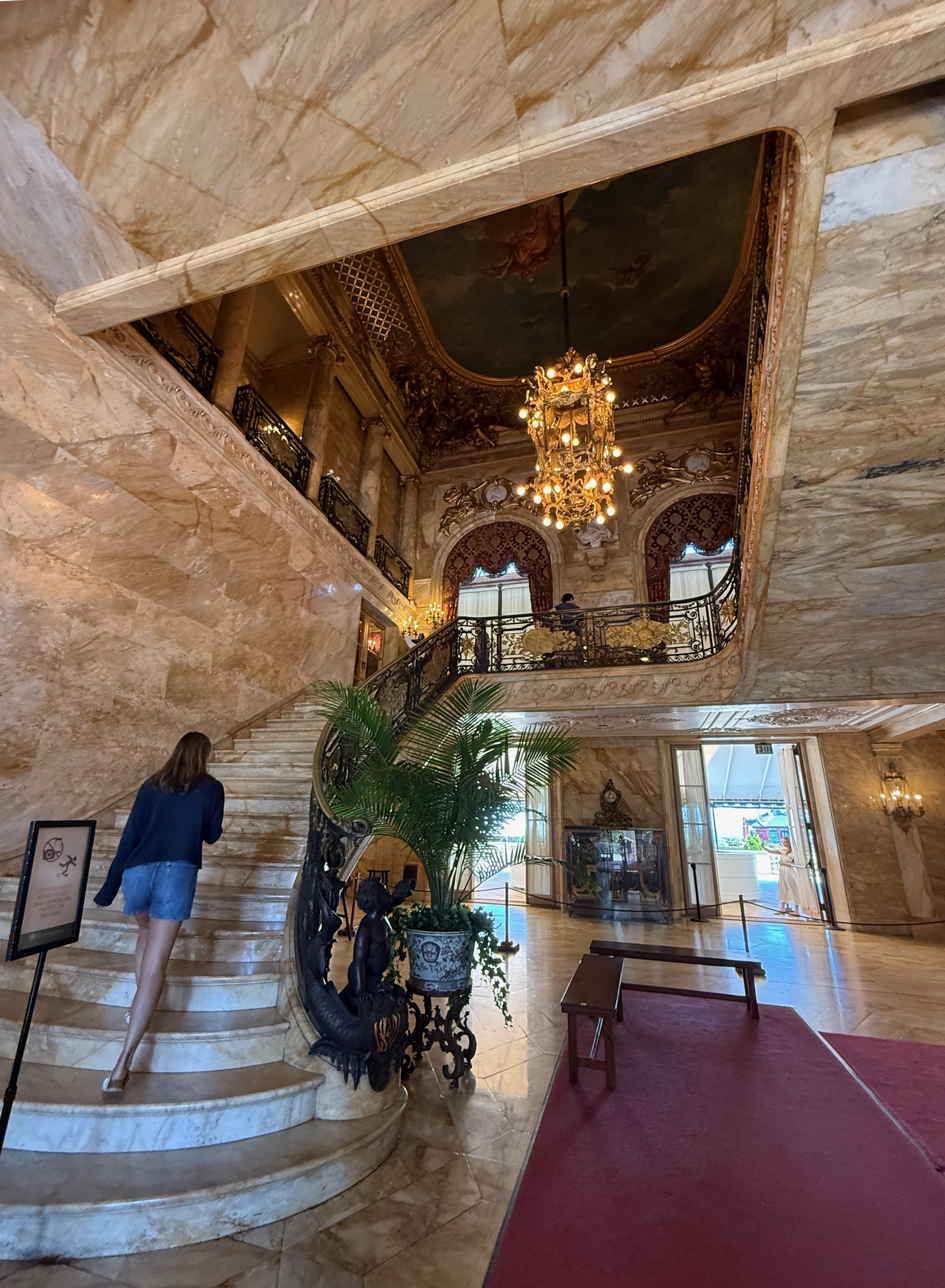
Main stair

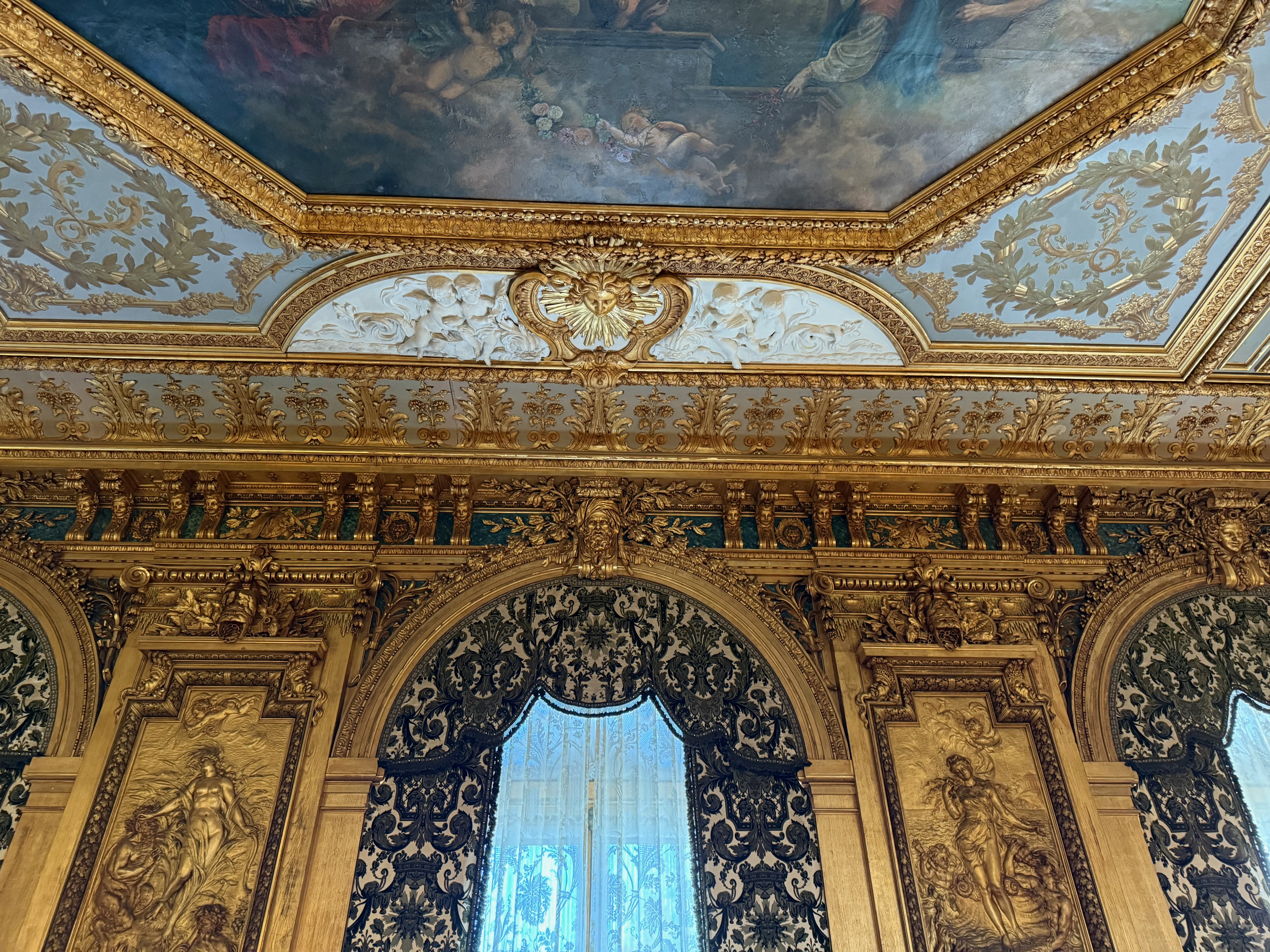
Ballroom wall and ceiling detail

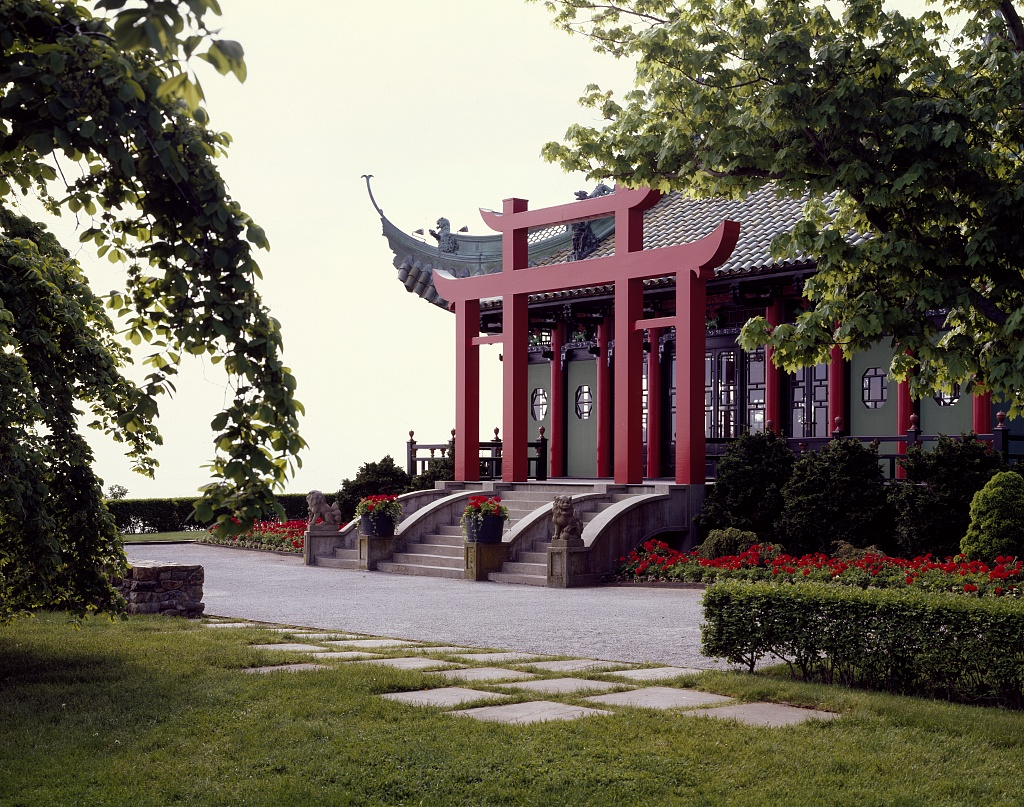
Tea House

== See also ==
- List of Gilded Age mansions
- List of National Historic Landmarks in Rhode Island
- Beacon Towers, Long Island
- Mrs. O. H. P. Belmont House, Manhattan
- National Register of Historic Places listings in Newport County, Rhode Island
