= Bertha G. Higgins =

American suffragist and civil rights activist

Bertha Grant Higgins (born Dillard; November 18, 1872 – December 30, 1944) was an American suffragist, civil rights activist and clubwoman. She was involved in supporting women's suffrage in Rhode Island. She strongly supported the Dyer Anti-Lynching bill and worked towards equal rights for African Americans.

== Biography ==
Higgins was born as Bertha Grant Dillard on November 18, 1872, in Danville, Virginia. Before she was married, she studied fashion design in London and Paris. She married her first husband, Walker C. Thomas in 1887 and the couple moved to Jersey City, New Jersey. She was widowed in 1897 and the next year, married Dr. William H. Higgins. They moved to Manhattan where Higgins finished his residency and Bertha Higgins worked as a seamstress. In 1903, the couple moved to Providence, Rhode Island. Higgins had one daughter, Prudence, in 1913. She also helped to raise her younger sister, Chesta Dillard, who became a pharmacist and businesswoman in Philadelphia. During this time, Higgins worked as a homemaker and was involved in community organizations. She worked with a group of black women in 1907 to petition the mayor and the school to hire a black teacher.

Higgins became involved in the fight for woman's suffrage in 1913. Higgins believed that having voting rights would benefit black people as a whole. She became involved with the Woman Suffrage Party of Rhode Island. Suffragists in Rhode Island were more welcoming to black members than other groups in the country. At the 1913 Conference of the Rhode Island Union of Colored Women's Clubs, she discussed and debated women's suffrage which led to the group endorsing her view. She wrote letters to elected officials. In 1916, she helped raise money for the suffrage effort by staging a suffrage variety show with the patronage of the Twentieth Century Art and Literary Club. During World War I, she led activities to support soldiers in the war.

After women in Rhode Island gained the right to vote (first in 1917 at presidential elections and finally in 1920 after the ratification of the 19th Amendment), she continued to encourage voting. Higgins was one of the founding members of the Rhode Island League of Women Voters. In 1920, Higgins founded the Julia Ward Howe Republican Women's Club in order to help recruit black women into the Republican Party and support Republican candidates. She was dedicated to the election of Warren Harding as President of the United States and was even invited to his inauguration. She became the vice president of the National Republican's Women Auxiliary, Colored, Eastern District by 1925 and worked with Mary Church Terrell.

Higgins put pressure on her representative, Clark Burdick and Senator LeBaron Colt to support the Dyer Anti-Lynching bill. Burdick supported the bill, though Colt did not. Higgins blamed the Republican senators for the defeat of the bill.

In 1932, Higgins created the Colored Independent Political Association of Rhode Island. She started the group after becoming disillusioned with the Republican party. Higgins was also critical of the lack of support for civil rights issues from her local Republican politicians. Higgins eventually backed the Democratic Party in the 1932 presidential election. Her Julia Ward Howe club eventually became the Julia Ward Howe Democratic Women's Club.

Higgins also lobbied and worked to see black people obtain "gainful employment" and was successful in seeing her daughter become the first black social worker at the Rhode Island Department of Public Welfare.

In 1938, Higgins lost her husband to a possible suicide. For a year and a half, she left politics and activism, only returning on a limited basis in the 1940s. During World War II, she worked to support soldiers and to help reintegrate returning black soldiers. She spoke at the 1942 Rhode Island Democratic Party Convention.

Higgins had been suffering from heart disease and recovering from a stroke. On December 30, 1944, Higgins died in her home in Providence.
