= Mary H. Dickerson =

African American businesswoman and clubwoman (1830–1914)

Mary H. Dickerson (October 22, 1830 - July 1, 1914) was an African American businesswoman and clubwoman. Dickerson founded several women's groups in the New England area and in Newport, Rhode Island. Her dress shop catered to prominent clients in Newport and she was the first Black woman to open a shop on her block on Bellevue Avenue.

== Biography ==
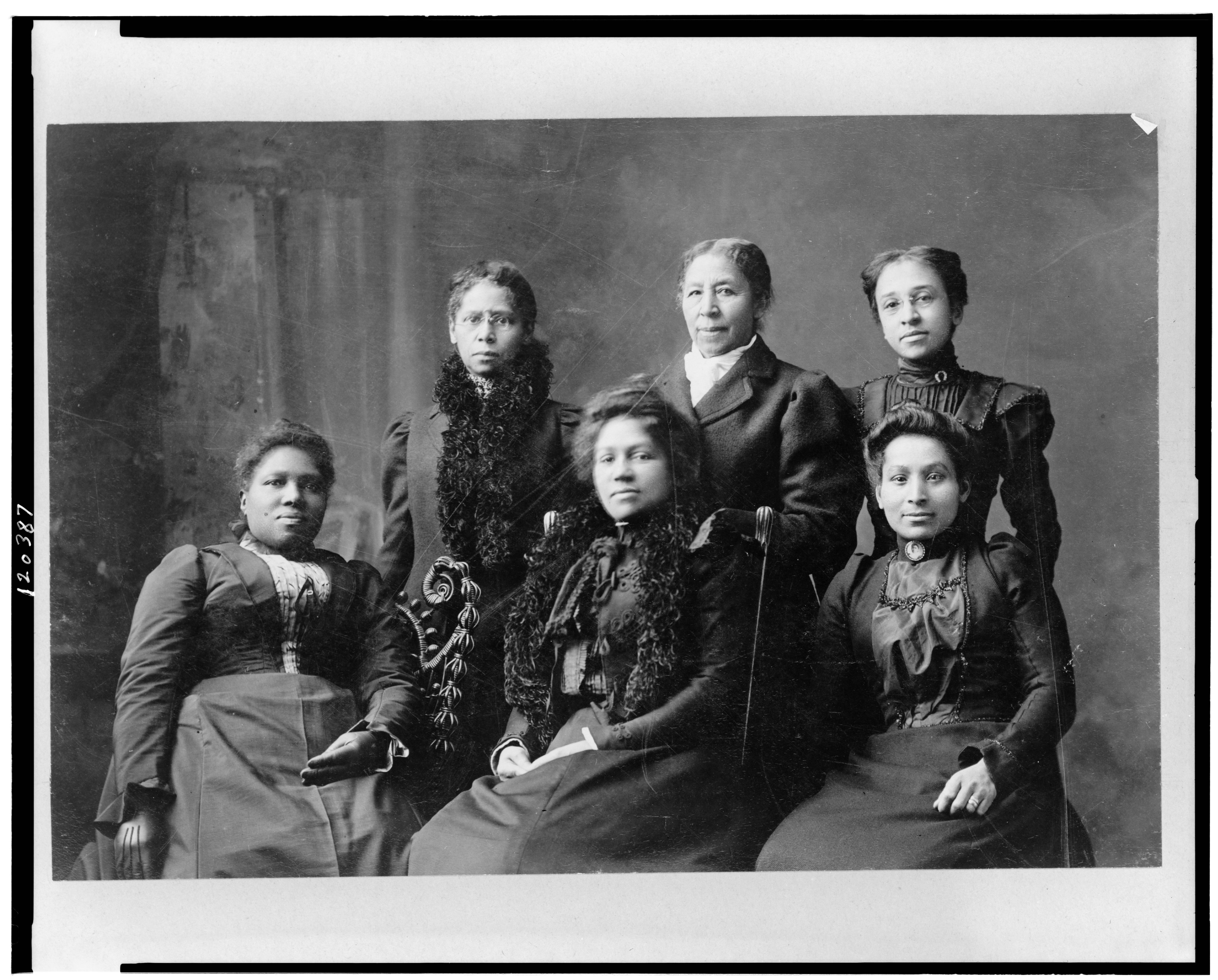
Executive board of Women's League, Newport, Rhode Island.

Dickerson was born on October 22, 1830, in Haddam, Connecticut. She grew up in New Haven, Connecticut. Dickerson and her husband, Silas, moved to Newport, Rhode Island, sometime around 1865. She opened a dressmaking shop in the early 1870s. She was the first Black woman to open a store in that location on Bellevue Avenue and her clients were "prominent people in the city" of Newport.

In 1895, Dickerson founded the Women's Newport League. On June 3, 1896, she and Josephine St. Pierre Ruffin created the Northeastern Federation of Women's Clubs. In 1900, Dickerson provided photos of African American clubs, organizations and individuals from Newport to be included in the "negro exhibit" for the Paris Exposition. In 1903, she founded the Rhode Island Union of Colored Women's Clubs. Dickerson was the honorary president of the New England Federation of Women's Clubs in 1904.

Dickerson's husband died at home after suffering a long illness on September 28, 1898. She and her husband had one son, Frederick C. Dickerson who did business in New Bedford, Massachusetts, and Boston. Dickerson died in Newport on July 1, 1914. She was buried in New Haven, Connecticut.
