= New England Woman Suffrage Association =

The New England Woman Suffrage Association (NEWSA) was established in November 1868 to campaign for the right of women to vote in the U.S. Its principal leaders were Julia Ward Howe, its first president, and Lucy Stone, who later became president. It was active until 1920, when suffrage for women was secured by the Nineteenth Amendment to the U.S. Constitution.

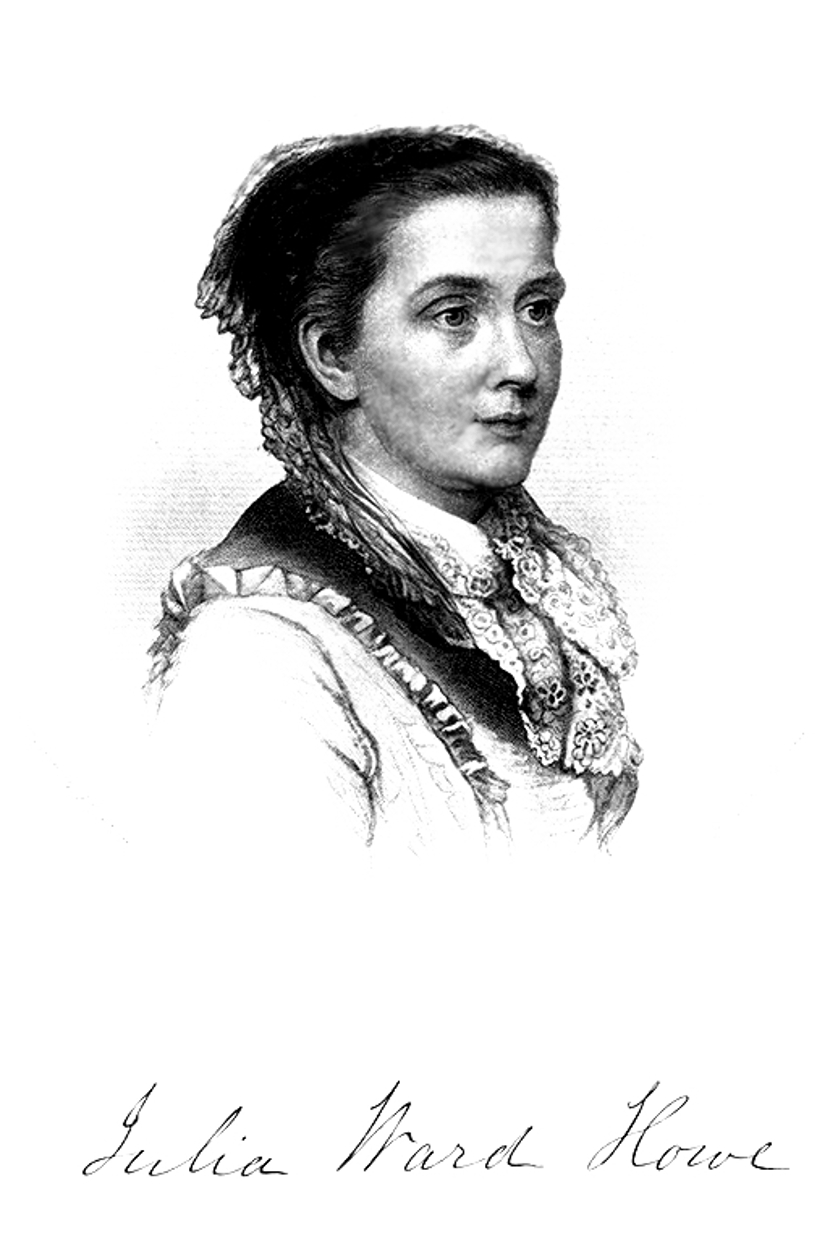
Julia Ward Howe, first president of the New England Woman Suffrage Association

The NEWSA was formed during a period when a split was developing within the women's rights movement and also between one wing of that movement and the abolitionist movement. Disagreement was especially sharp over the proposal to enfranchise African American men before enfranchising women. The NEWSA, which accepted that approach, was organized partly to counter the activities of Susan B. Anthony and Elizabeth Cady Stanton, who opposed it, insisting that women and black men should be enfranchised at the same time. The NEWSA also maintained close ties with the abolitionist movement and the Republican Party whereas Stanton and Anthony were working toward an independent women's movement.

The NEWSA was the first major political organization with women's suffrage as its goal. It was formed on a regional basis several months before the establishment of two national women's suffrage organizations, the National Woman Suffrage Association and the American Woman Suffrage Association. The NEWSA played a key role in the formation of the latter and had overlapping leadership with it.

== Background ==
The New England Woman Suffrage Association (NEWSA) was formed during a period when a split was developing within the women's rights movement and also between one wing of that movement and the abolitionist movement. Disagreements had already weakened the American Equal Rights Association, which was formed in 1866 by women's rights advocates and abolitionists to campaign for equal rights, including suffrage, for all citizens regardless of race or sex. Priority had become an issue: should universal suffrage be the immediate goal, or should African American men be enfranchised first? After slavery was abolished in the U.S. in 1865, the American Anti-Slavery Society declared that its work would not be finished until African Americans were also guaranteed political equality. By the time of the NEWSA's founding, hope for fulfillment of that goal was embodied in a proposed Fifteenth Amendment to the U.S. Constitution that would prohibit the denial of suffrage because of race. Because it would not also prohibit the denial of suffrage because of sex, however, it became a focal point for discord within the women's movement.

Some members of the women's movement, such as Abby Kelley Foster, supported the amendment because they believed that suffrage for African American males was a more pressing need than suffrage for women. Others, such as Susan B. Anthony and Elizabeth Cady Stanton, opposed any amendment that would in effect enfranchise all men while excluding all women, believing it would create an "aristocracy of sex" by giving constitutional authority to the idea that men were superior to women. Lucy Stone, who played a leading role in the NEWSA, argued that suffrage for women was more important than suffrage for black men but also supported the Fifteenth Amendment.

The split also involved different assessments of the ruling Republican Party. Many leading women's suffragists had been introduced to social activism through the anti-slavery movement and felt loyalty to both that movement and to the Republican Party, which had provided political leadership for the abolition of slavery in the U.S. and was still in the difficult process of consolidating that victory. After the uncomfortably close elections of 1868, Republican leaders recognized the importance of enfranchising African American men, most of whom were recently freed slaves, as a way of helping to preserve the victory over slaveholders during the American Civil War (1861–1865). They and their abolitionist allies increasingly viewed women's suffrage as an objective that, even if successful, would not produce comparable political benefits, and they considered the campaign for it to be a drain on resources that were needed elsewhere.

Women's rights activists generally had been strong supporters of the abolitionist movement and had also depended heavily on its resources. Those who distanced themselves from abolitionist and Republican leadership during this period, however, found themselves increasingly cut off from abolitionist resources and sometimes the target of outright hostility from Republicans. Stanton, Anthony and their allies felt betrayed and began to criticize the Republican Party and some of the abolitionist leadership. Olympia Brown, an ally who played a role in the NEWSA's creation, criticized abolitionist leaders by name and said, "We must look for our support to new men". Stanton and Anthony greatly inflamed feelings by accepting help from George Francis Train, a supporter of women's rights who was also a wealthy Democrat and an outspoken racist. Other women's suffrage activists, however, continued to support the abolitionist leadership and the Republican Party to varying degrees.

== History ==
=== Planning committee ===
Olympia Brown, who had recently become one of the first ordained woman ministers, initiated the proposal for a New England women's suffrage organization. She hoped to create an association that would limit its activity to a campaign for women's suffrage, believing that campaigning for suffrage for both women and African Americans, as the American Equal Rights Association had done, would cause women's suffrage to be overshadowed. She sought to create an organization that would, in her own words, campaign on a "clear-cut, separate and single question."

On the advice of Abby Kelley Foster, she announced a meeting in Boston in May 1868 to discuss her proposal and succeeded in gathering a hall full of people. The meeting established a planning committee chaired by Caroline Severance. Brown found herself and her single-issue approach sidelined by the planners of the new organization. Seeking to counter the initiatives of Susan B. Anthony and Elizabeth Cady Stanton, the committee launched an organization that supported suffrage for both blacks and women and was willing for black men to achieve suffrage first.

In addition to Brown and Severance, key figures in the planning for the new organization included John Neal, Abby Kelley Foster, her husband Stephen Symonds Foster, and Thomas Wentworth Higginson, many of whom had been important figures in the abolitionist movement. Lucy Stone, a pioneering worker for women's rights who later became a leading figure in the new organization, had not yet moved to Boston from New Jersey and was not deeply involved in its planning. She attended the founding convention, however and was elected to the new organization's executive committee.

=== Founding convention ===
The New England Woman Suffrage Association (NEWSA) was formed on November 19, 1868, during the second and last day of a regional women's rights convention in Boston, Massachusetts, where the new organization was to be headquartered. Instead of distancing itself from the Republican Party, as Anthony and Stanton were doing, the planners for the NEWSA convention worked to attract Republican support and seated leading Republican politicians, including a U.S. senator, on the speaker's platform.

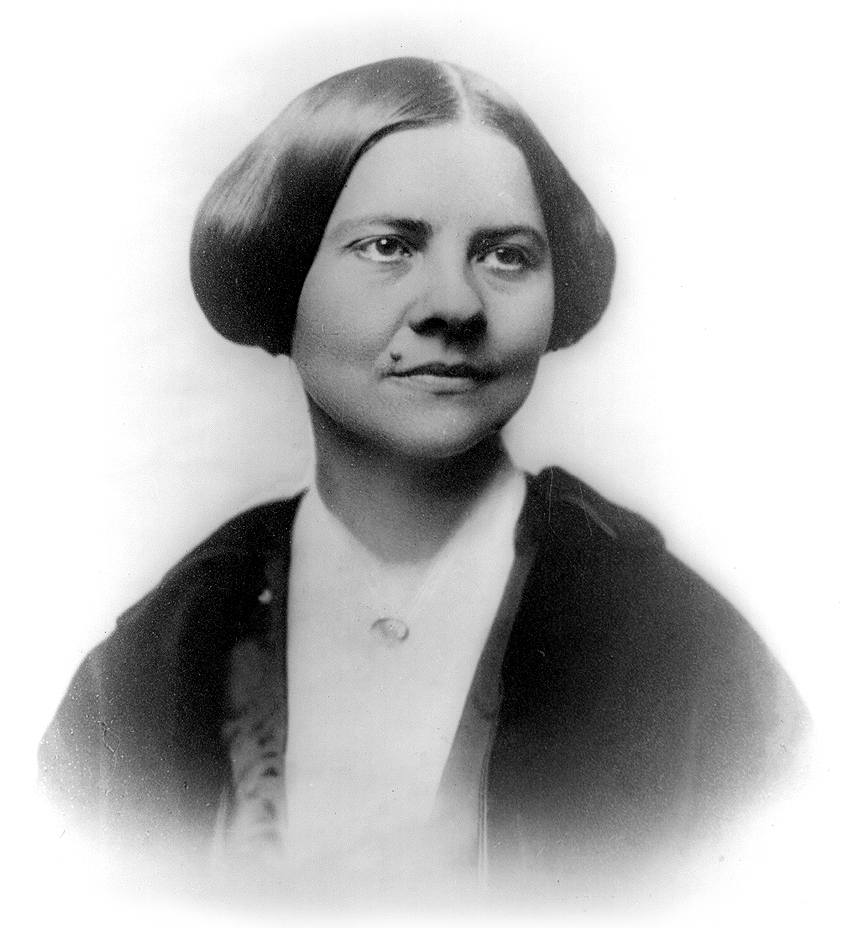
Lucy Stone

At the time of the NEWSA convention, Congress was considering the proposed Fifteenth Amendment, which would prohibit the denial of suffrage because of race but would not, as many women suffragists had hoped, also prohibit the denial of suffrage because of sex. (The amendment was approved by Congress in February 1869 and ratified by the states in 1870.) At the convention, Francis Bird, one of the most powerful politicians in Massachusetts, said, "Negro suffrage, being a paramount question, would have to be settled before woman suffrage could receive the attention it deserved."

Amid increasing confidence that the Fifteenth Amendment was assured of passage, Lucy Stone, a future president of the NEWSA, showed her preference for enfranchising both women and black men by unexpectedly introducing a resolution calling for the Republican Party to "drop its watchword of 'Manhood Suffrage'" and support universal suffrage instead. Despite opposition by Frederick Douglass, William Lloyd Garrison and Frances Harper, Stone convinced the meeting to approve the resolution. Two months later, however, when the Fifteenth Amendment was in danger of becoming stalled in Congress, Stone backed away from that position and declared that "Woman must wait for the Negro."

The NEWSA supported the Fifteenth Amendment, believing that achieving suffrage for all men would be a step toward suffrage for women. The wing of the women's movement associated with the NEWSA expected the Republican Party to push for women's suffrage after the Fifteenth Amendment was ratified (an expectation that was not realized).

Julia Ward Howe, author of "The Battle Hymn of the Republic," was elected as the NEWSA's first president. A member of a prominent family, she had recently been convinced to join the women's suffrage movement by Higginson and Stone. During the convention, Howe said she would not demand suffrage for women until it was achieved for blacks.

=== Activities ===
State affiliates of the NEWSA were formed in most New England states. In January 1869, supporters of the NEWSA began publishing a newspaper called the Woman's Advocate from the office of the American Anti-Slavery Society.

Although the NEWSA waited until suffrage for blacks was assured before it began campaigning for women's suffrage at the national level, it pressed at an early stage for laws that would enfranchise women in the District of Columbia and the federal territories. Another of its early initiatives was the collection of 8000 signatures on petitions to the Massachusetts legislature in 1869 in support of women's suffrage in that state, which led to the practice of annual public hearings on that question in the state legislature. The NEWSA's work in subsequent years included fund-raising bazaars, lectures, petitions and legislative hearings.

The split in the women's movement was formalized in May 1869 when Susan B. Anthony and Elizabeth Cady Stanton created the National Woman Suffrage Association to represent their wing. The executive committee of the NEWSA responded by laying the groundwork for a rival organization called the American Woman Suffrage Association (AWSA), which was founded in November 1869. Henry Ward Beecher, a prominent minister, agreed to become the first president of the AWSA, but NEWSA leaders Lucy Stone and Julia Ward Howe played key roles both in the formation of the AWSA and in its leadership in subsequent years.

Julia Ward Howe served as president of the NEWSA until 1877. Lucy Stone was elected president that year and served until her death in 1893. Howe was again elected president in 1893 and served until her death in 1910. Alice Stone Blackwell, Lucy Stone's daughter, was president from 1911 until the organization ceased to exist in 1920. When the Nineteenth Amendment, which secured suffrage for women, was ratified in 1920, the NEWSA simply ceased to function rather than formally dissolving.

== See also ==
- Women's suffrage in the United States
- List of major women's suffrage organizations
- List of American suffragists
- List of women's rights organizations
- Timeline of women's suffrage
- Voting rights in the United States
