= Brookholt School of Agriculture for Women =

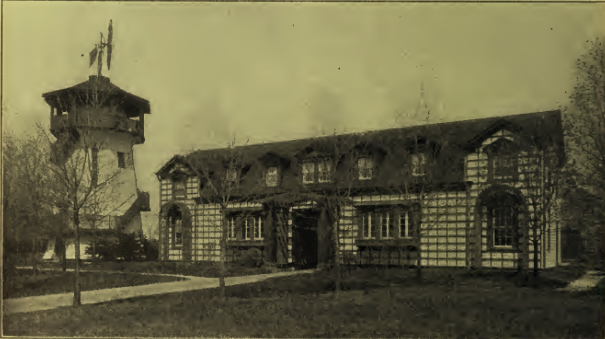
- Girls' dormitory
- Brookholt estate, East Meadow hamlet, Hempstead, Long Island, New York, U.S.

Information
- Other name: Belmont's farm school for girls
- Type: vocational school
- Established: 1911
- Founder: Alva Belmont
- Gender: women

The Brookholt School of Agriculture for Women (also known as Belmont's Farm School for Girls) was an experimental American farm vocational school for women. Established on April 1, 1911, by Alva Belmont on her Brookholt estate, located in the hamlet of East Meadow, 3 miles (4.8 km) from Hempstead, Long Island, New York, it was believed to be the first institution of its kind for the exclusive benefit of women.

In Belmont's view, much of the gardening in Europe was done by women, but it was not the custom in the U.S. and she aimed to change that. In 1912, when it became evident to Belmont that the students were not suited to farm life, she ended the experiment.

== History ==
Alva Vanderbilt married Oliver Belmont on January 11, 1896, following her divorce from William Kissam Vanderbilt the previous year. The Belmonts desired an estate on Long Island and Brookholt, a Gilded Age mansion on a 400 acres (160 ha) estate, was the result. It was reported in 1904 that wherever she went, Mrs. Belmont proclaimed her intention to settle down as a farmer's wife. But after Oliver died in 1908, she put the estate up for sale the following year.

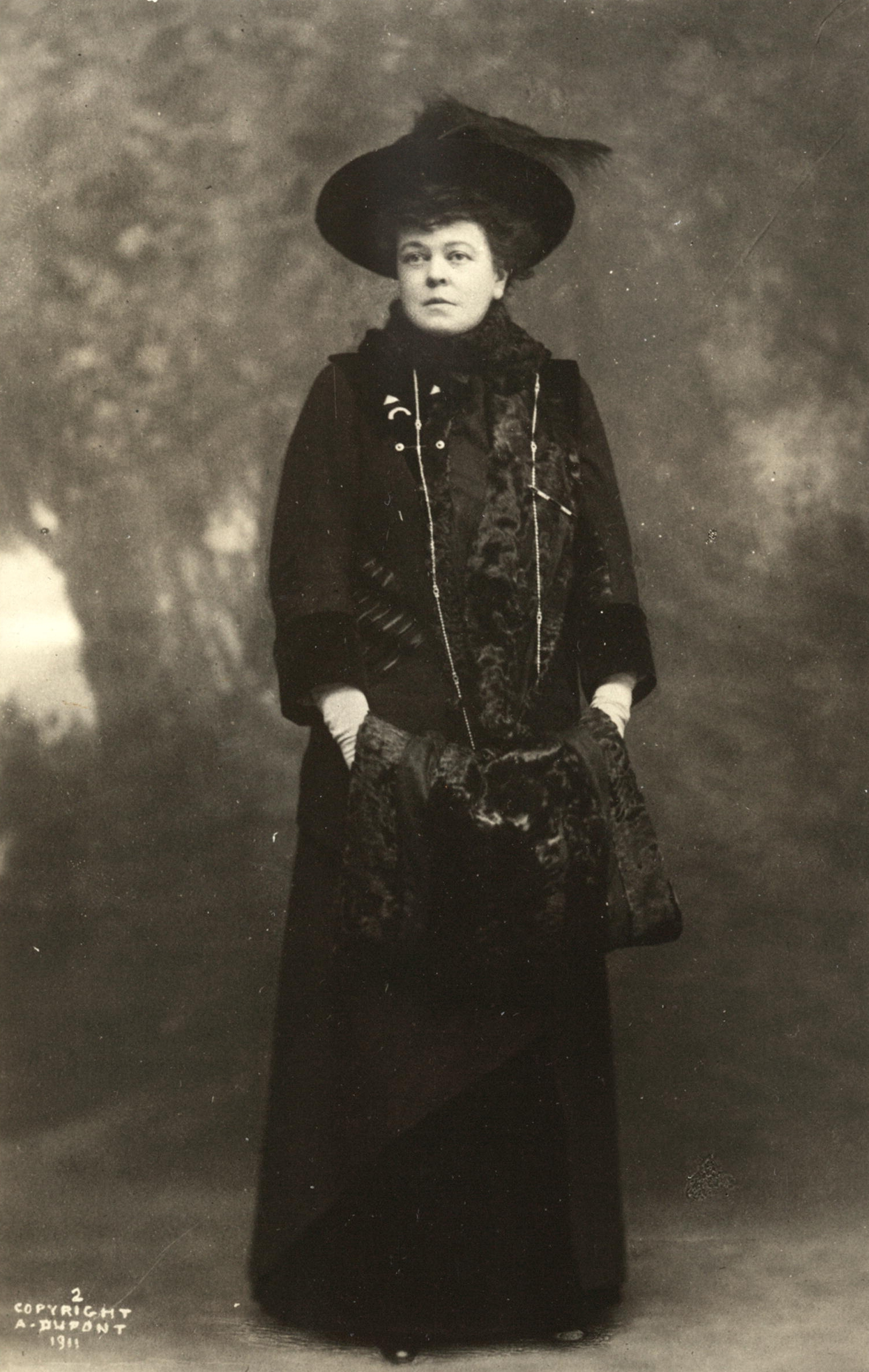
Alva Belmont, 1911

For 25 years, Belmont had been devoted to landscape gardening, from the cultivation of flowers and fruit to the management of a farm, finding in these each year complete renewal of all that had been lost in a winter's season of social events. It was natural, therefore, that in thinking over plans for improving the conditions of women and her property at Brookholt, Belmont evolved this scheme -an experiment- for showing women the charm and value of farm life.

At the time, Brookholt was a fertile and highly improved tract of 240 acres (97 ha) lying within the "hold" of two arms or branches of the Meadowbrook, where it divides in its course to the ocean 3 miles (4.8 km) to the south. Beyond the main house, past the orchards and the long garage, thru an avenue of maples, sat the Belmont farmhouse, its fame increased by the advent of the farmers of the future, nicknamed "farmerettes". This school was the expression of Belmont who had been devoting practically all of her time and a considerable part of her large income to the advancement of women. Belmont believed that the very foundation of this was economic independence, and that women must not be simply able to earn a bare subsistence, but must be trained for a permanent occupation which would give them a chance to make more than a mere living and to become more than a lifelong employee of somebody else.

Belmont looked upon agriculture, horticulture and landscape gardening as ideal employments for women, offering permanent, healthful work that could be followed into advanced age. They were not overcrowded, they would always afford fair pay. Instructors would be more and more in demand at good salaries. All owners of large places were harassed at the time with the unreliability of the men whom they had to employ, due largely to their habits. There were so many things which trained women could do well—in the gardens, the greenhouses, the orchards, the dairies —that they could be sure of employment.

Should the experiment prove successful, Belmont's intention was to make the institution permanent, to direct it during her lifetime and to endow it at her death. However, within a year, it became evident to Belmont that the students were not suited to farm life, which influenced her to end the experiment in 1912. She sold the Brookholt estate in 1915 to Alexander Smith Cochran.

== Enrollment ==
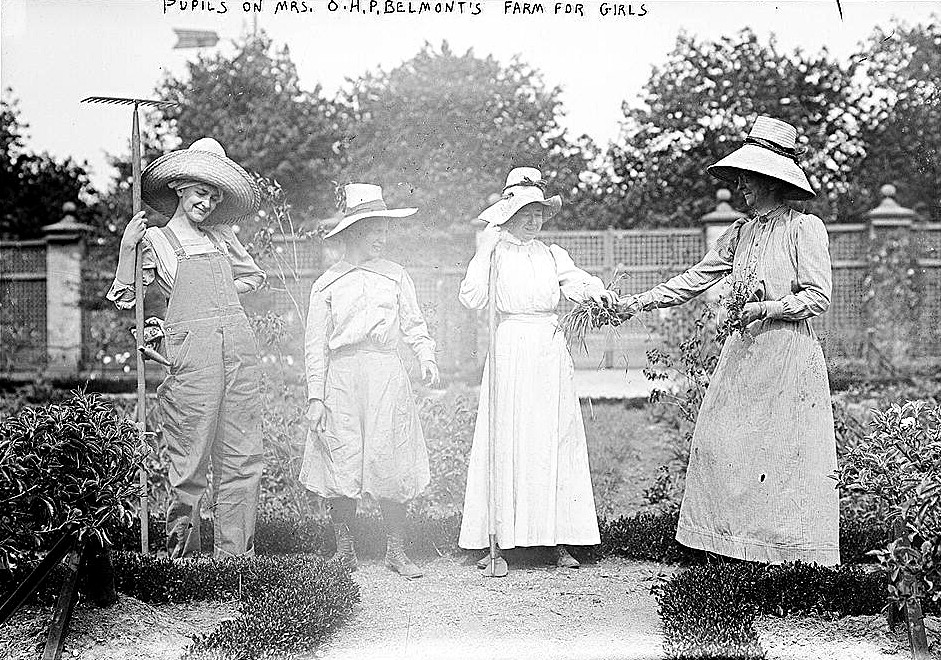

In March 1911, immediately after the announcement appeared in newspapers that Belmont was opening a school on her Long Island estate, letters, telephone message, and personal inquiries began to come to the headquarters of the Political Equality Association she founded, located on Manhattan's Fifth Avenue. During the first three days of the application period, 210 women applied for admission. Applications were received from a number of Western States and from Canada and from different social classes. The school was originally designed for shop girls, girls whose lives were supposedly difficult, but it developed that the girls of the shops did not care to leave the city, the farm holding no lure for them. There were many applicants from among typewriters and stenographers, bookkeppers and other office girls of higher grades. The results was that the standard of education among the students was surprisingly high. No questions were asked as to class or creed, but every applicant for the school had to answer the requirements as to health and character.

The first class of 20 students were from New Jersey, Connecticut, but mostly from Greater New York, including 14 from Manhattan. Student ages ranged from 18 to 24. There were two students who had grown anemic over unproductive easels, glad to exchange art for nature. There were girls from the shirt waist and cloak factories, from the sweat shops where artificial flowers were made. One English girl and her sister put away their savings to invest in a few acres for themselves as soon as they learned kitchen gardening.

== Architecture and fittings ==
When the farmhouse was built some years before the school opened, Belmont gave it the attention that she bestowed on the family mansion. The architecture was English, but the interior was Dutch, with low, beamed ceilings, oak presses built in the walls, and the entrance hall done in blue tiles painted from Belmont's own sketches. She combined sanitation with artistic merit, as evidenced by a large, light, well-appointed kitchen and the designs of horse trough, seats for resting, and fencing around the barnyard court. The other two sides of the large yard were enclosed by the wagon houses, barns and dairy, where the girls learned the care of milk and butter making, while the hives of Italian bees were sheltered from the wind.

Dormitory rooms included beds fitted with thick mattresses laid on box-springs and dressing tables. There were porcelain bath tubs and enough hot water; fresh toilet and soft slippers; a supper served on white tablecloth, with linen napkins. Two bicycles were part of the equipment along with sewing machines and several typewriters.

The recreation hall included a library, a piano, some fine pictures, and easy chairs. Here, lectures would be given not only on subjects connected with the school but also on the question of women's suffrage.

== Staff ==
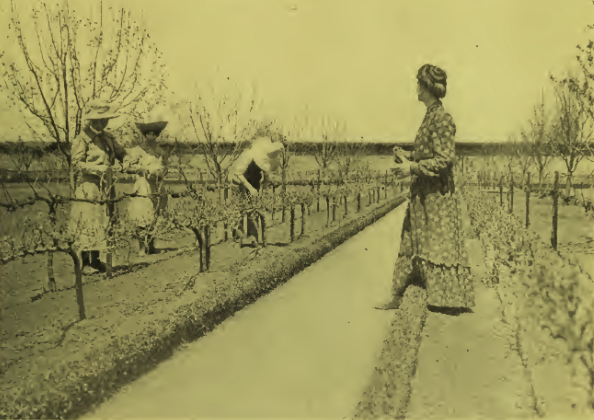
Training dwarf fruit trees on a trellis.

No one at the school had any theoretical knowledge or training. The director of the school was Mrs. Laura Dutton Williams, a Quaker by birth. Belmont being practical above all else, she chose an experienced woman farmer and found her in Williams, who had for years owned and managed a farm near Philadelphia. Later, she came into that city and took charge of the school garden work of an industrial home, so she was prepared to work with the students in the evening and help them make up their day's record of work, character of the soil, fertilizers used, and kind of planting with dates for later reference. She could teach them the care of cows to the care of bees, and how to harness and drive a horse.

Instruction in the domestic arts of cooking and housekeeping occurred in the winter months. Students learned to sew, knit, and crochet things, which could be sold at Belmont's suffrage headquarters. Mrs. Jacobina Levy, the household superintendent, was fitted to teach the domestic arts, having been trained to do so in Germany. For a number of years, she was matron of the Sheltering and Guardian Society in New York.

There was one trained nurse on staff.

A boy was hired to wash the dishes —the girls being considered too valuable for that commonplace work— and several pairs of overalls were purchased for him.

== Student life ==
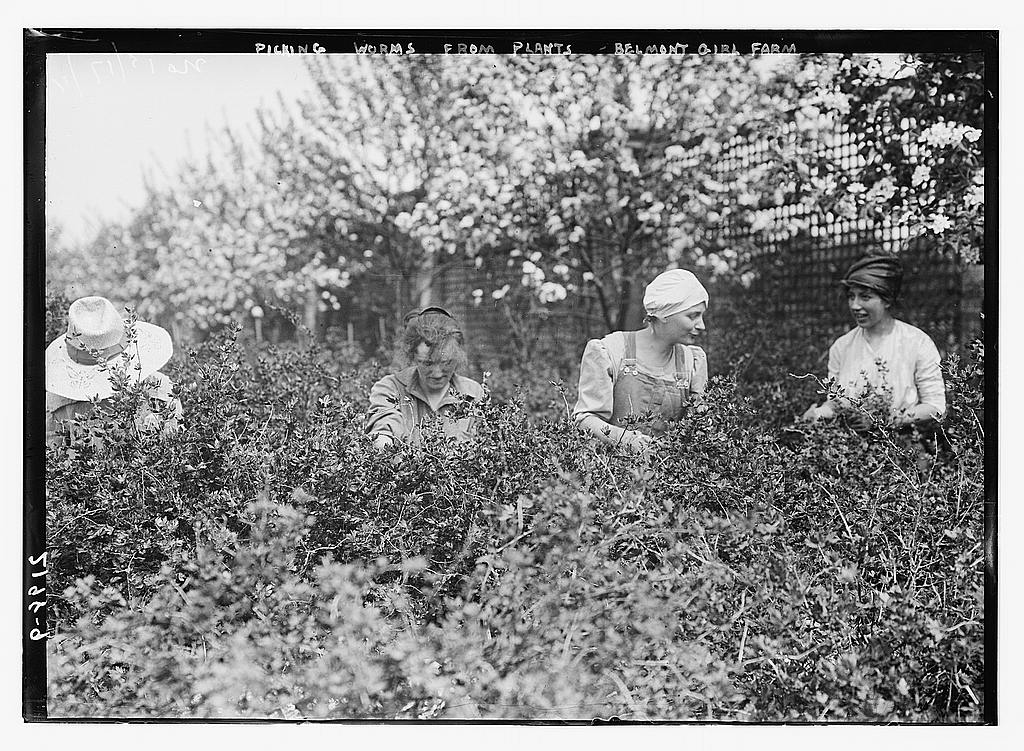
Picking worms from plants.

Belmont designed the students' uniforms. Each wore a slouch hat and a blue blouse. The skirts or bloomers came just to the tips of the high boys' shoes that adorned their uniforms. A suggestion that the students get rid of the care and inconvenience of long hair was unanimously vetoed.

The girls were up at 6:00 AM, putting their rooms in order and getting ready for a hearty breakfast.

At 7:30, they repaired to the fields and began the daily outdoor tasks. First of all, flowers, vegetables and fruit were gathered, first for Belmont, who was responsible for the enterprise, and who paid the girls their weekly wage, and then for the public market. All of the parts of the farm that were not consumed by the student colony itself and by Belmont were sold to regular dealers at regular market prices. The flowers and fruit trees were trimmed, the vegetable patches were weeded, the fields were tilled. They worked the fields if corn or potatoes were to be planted. They applied the phosphate fertilizer and put in 12 acres (4.9 ha) of corn one week. At nightfall, when at six o'clock, the milking began.

They liked best to work in the French garden, laid out years earlier by an imported professional gardener. It included grapevines, pears, peaches, plums and apricots trained on low trellises. Vegetables of all kinds were put in this rich soil, and they could see the results so much more quickly than from the grains. The flowers had a still a greater attraction, but for almost everyone, there was a fascination simply in working in the ground. Besides gardening, the curriculum included dairying, poultry-raising, and bee-keeping. The school grounds included hay fields, corn fields, and enormous potato patches. By way of live stock, the school was provided with eight cows, several horses, and many pigs.

Cold, rainy days, they stayed in the house and prepared the 35 bushels of potatoes to be planted by machine.

After supper, the girls were free to do as they pleased. Mostly, they gathered in the common room of the dormitory and wrote or read, played, sang or sewed until bedtime.

Students had Sundays free and could go to the city by permission. They could leave the school at any time if they did not like it. They could be dismissed at any time if they were not deemed worthy to remain.

== See also ==
- Vocational education in the United States
