= EMJC =

EMJC may refer to:

- East Meadow Beth-El Jewish Center, a Conservative synagogue in East Meadow, New York
- East Midwood Jewish Center, a Conservative synagogue in Midwood, Brooklyn, New York
