= Senator Speno Memorial Park =

Park in East Meadow, Nassau County, New York, United States

Edward J. Speno Memorial Park
- Interactive map of Edward J. Speno Memorial Park
- Type: Active
- Location: East Meadow, New York
- Coordinates: 40°42′27″N 73°32′54″W
- Area: 18.2 acres (7.4 ha)
- Owner: Town of Hempstead
- Operator: Town of Hempstead Department of Parks and Recreation
- Website: Senator Speno Memorial Park – Town of Hempstead

Senator Speno Memorial Park (also known as Edward J. Speno Memorial Park, or simply Speno Park) is a park located off East Meadow Avenue within the hamlet and Census-designated Place (CDP) of East Meadow, in the Town of Hempstead, in Nassau County, New York, United States.

== Description ==
Senator Speno Memorial Park is situated on 18.2 acres (7.4 ha) land in East Meadow, adjacent to the Nassau County Bird Sanctuary and a stormwater retention pond. It consists of an administration and community building, a playground, shuffleboard facilities, tennis courts, basketball courts, and multiple ballfields. The park also has a parking lot.

Owned and operated by the Town of Hempstead, the park serves as a memorial to New York State Senator Edward J. Speno, who lived in East Meadow at the time of his death in 1971.

== History ==
What is now Speno Park had been used throughout the early and mid-20th century as a sand mine. This 38-acre (15 ha) mine had closed in the early 1960s, after controversies between it and the Town of Hempstead resulted in the United States Supreme Court ruling against the mine in the 1962 case, Goldblatt v. Town of Hempstead. The Town of Hempstead then acquired the southern 18 acres (7.3 ha) of the former mine through eminent domain in 1963, for conversion into the park and for drainage purposes, while the remaining 20 acres (8.1 ha) to its north were acquired by Nassau County, which turned the mine's lake into a stormwater retention pond, which would later also serve as the site of the East Meadow Bird Sanctuary.

In October 1971, groundbreaking on the new park began, with Speno's widow, Audrey, among the more than 100 guests and public officials at the ceremony. Temporary park facilities opened to the public in 1977 and 1978, while the permanent facilities and remainder of the park were constructed.

In 1984, additional construction work was announced in order to rectify drainage issues at some of the new facilities, raising construction costs. Construction of the park was completed in October 1989 after 12 years of planning, and it was formally opened on October 21 of that year – although the facility had been opened to the public prior.

== See also ==
- Eisenhower Park
- Mitchel Athletic Complex
