= Brookholt =

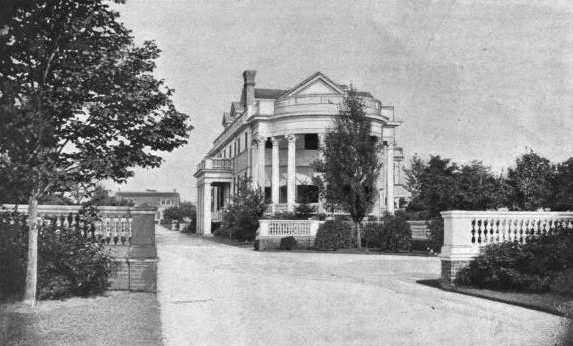
- The main house at Brookholt in 1902.

- Location within New York
- 40.71239°N 73.57647°W
- Location: East Meadow, New York

History
- Built: 1897

Site notes
- Architectural style: Colonial Revival

Brookholt was a Gilded Age mansion on Front Street in East Meadow, Long Island, New York. It was built for Oliver and Alva Belmont in 1897. Designed by Richard Howland Hunt, the house was built in the Colonial Revival-style, rendered in wood. John Russell Pope designed a Georgian-style farmhouse on the property in 1906 also.

== History ==
Alva Vanderbilt married Oliver Belmont on January 11, 1896, following her divorce from William Kissam Vanderbilt in March 1895. Alva had received a large settlement from the divorce, but the Long Island estate that she had helped design with Richard Morris Hunt, Idle Hour, was retained by William. Although the Belmonts already had two summerhouses in Newport, Rhode Island, Alva's Marble House and Oliver's Belcourt Castle, they desired a new estate on Long Island. Brookholt was the result.

Oliver Belmont died an early death at the estate in 1908, following an operation for appendicitis. Some scholars have alleged that Alva Belmont was superstitious about sleeping in a room where anyone had died. She did have a new master bedroom suite added to Brookholt following Oliver's death. After a mason also died in an accident during the new construction, she wrote: "It really does seem as though Fate had decided I am never to sleep peacefully at night."

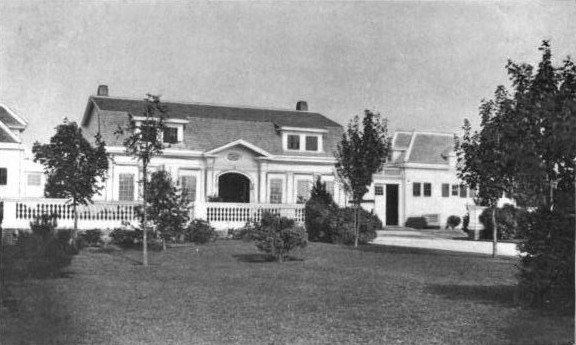
The stables in 1902.

Alva Belmont established the Brookholt School of Agriculture for Women on 200 acres (81 ha) of the estate in 1911, operating it as a training school for female farmers. The school did not work as Belmont had intended, so she terminated the experiment after its first year. After that Belmont focused all of her attention on the women's suffrage movement, holding many meetings and rallies at the estate.

Belmont began contemplating selling Brookholt as early as 1909. She finally sold it in 1915 to Alexander Smith Cochran. Cochran, in turn, sold the estate in late 1923 to the Coldstream Golf Club, which planned to turn the estate into a country club. The main house was ultimately destroyed by fire in 1934 and the rest of the estate buildings were later demolished. The site is now occupied by the Mitchel Manor development.
