= Alva Belmont =

American suffragist (1853–1933)

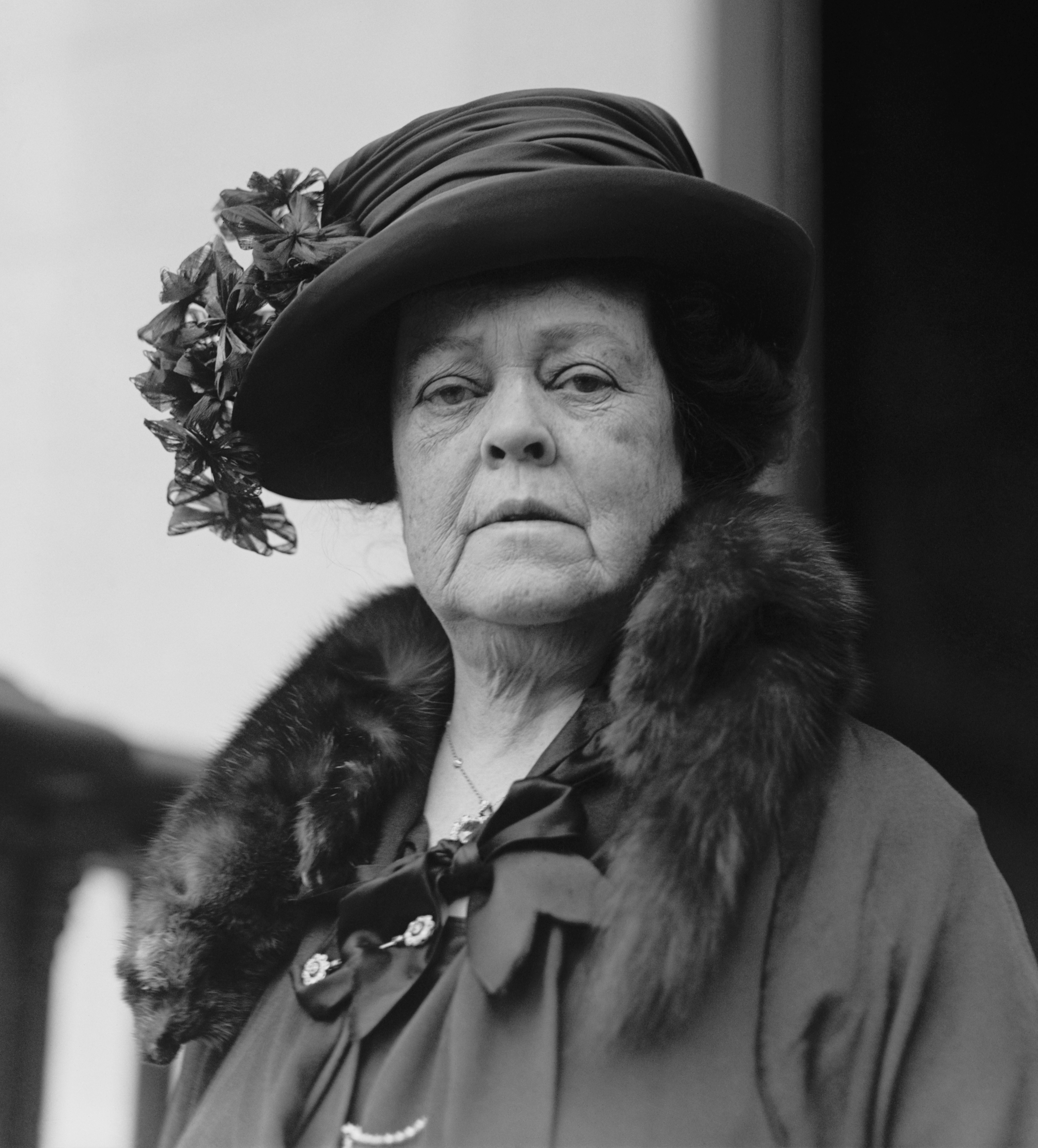
- Alva Belmont in 1922
- Born: Alva Erskine Smith; January 17, 1853; Mobile, Alabama, U.S.
- Died: January 26, 1933 (aged 80); Paris, France
- Resting place: Woodlawn Cemetery, Bronx, New York, U.S.
- Spouses: William Kissam Vanderbilt (m. 1875; div. 1895) Oliver Belmont (m. 1896; died 1908)
- Children: Consuelo Vanderbilt; William Kissam Vanderbilt II; Harold Stirling Vanderbilt
- Relatives: Robert Desha (grandfather)

Alva Erskine Belmont (née Smith; January 17, 1853 – January 26, 1933), known as Alva Vanderbilt from 1875 to 1896, was an American multi-millionaire socialite and women's suffrage activist. She was noted for her energy, intelligence, strong opinions, and willingness to challenge convention.

In 1909, she founded the Political Equality Association to get votes for suffrage-supporting New York State politicians, wrote articles for newspapers, and joined the National American Woman Suffrage Association (NAWSA). She later formed her own Political Equality Association to seek broad support for suffrage in neighborhoods throughout New York City, and, as its president, led its division of New York City's 1912 Women's Votes Parade. In 1916, she was one of the founders of the National Woman's Party (NWP) and organized the first picketing ever to take place before the White House, in January 1917. She was elected president of the NWP, an office she held until her death.

She was married twice, to socially prominent New York City millionaires William Kissam Vanderbilt, with whom she had three children, and Oliver Hazard Perry Belmont. Alva was known for her many building projects, including the Petit Chateau in New York; the Marble House in Newport, Rhode Island; the Belmont House in New York; Brookholt in Long Island; and Beacon Towers in Sands Point, New York.

On "Equal Pay Day," April 12, 2016, Belmont was honored when President Barack Obama established the Belmont-Paul Women's Equality National Monument in Washington, D.C., named for Alva Belmont and Alice Paul.

== Early life ==
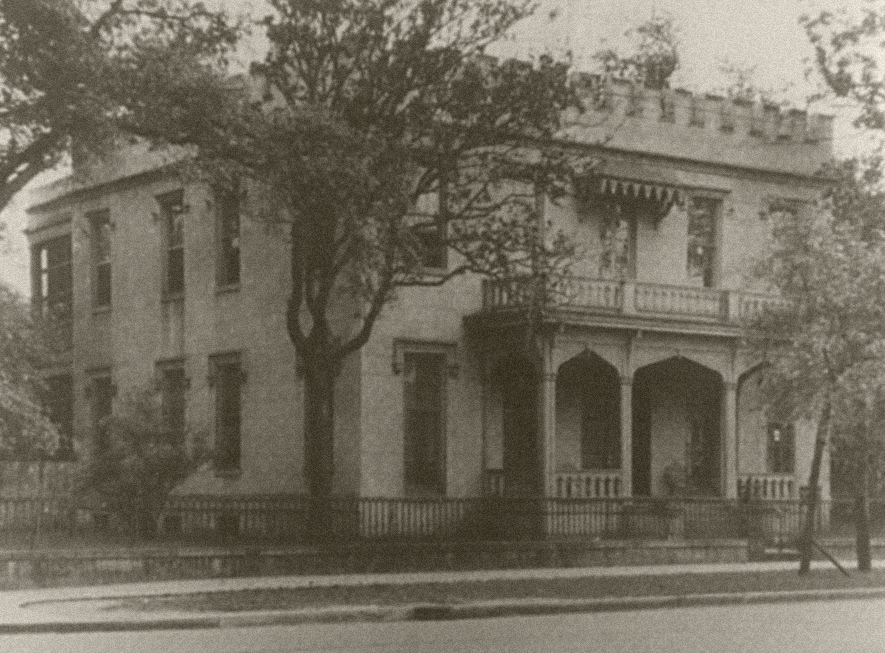
Her birthplace, the Murray Forbes Smith House at 201 Government Street in Mobile, Alabama

Alva Erskine Smith was born on January 17, 1853, at 201 Government Street in Mobile, Alabama, to Murray Forbes Smith, a commission merchant, and Phoebe Ann Desha. Smith was the son of George Smith and Delia Forbes of Dumfries, Virginia. Phoebe Desha was the daughter of US Representative Robert Desha and Eleanor Shelby, both originally from Sumner County, Tennessee. The Smith family were wealthy slaveholders.

Alva was one of seven children. Her sister Alice died as a child before she was born. Her brother, Murray Forbes Smith Jr. died in 1857 and was buried in Magnolia Cemetery in Mobile. Four other siblings, Desha Smith, Armide Vogel Smith, Julia Florence Smith, and Mary Virginia "Jennie" Smith, survived into adulthood. Jennie first married Fernando Yznaga, the brother of Alva's childhood best friend, Consuelo Yznaga, Duchess of Manchester. Following a divorce from Fernando in 1886, Jennie remarried, to William George Tiffany.

As a child, Alva summered with her parents in Newport, Rhode Island, and accompanied them on European vacations. In 1859, the Smiths left Mobile and relocated to New York City, where they briefly settled in Madison Square. When Murray went to Liverpool, England, to conduct his business, Alva's mother, Phoebe Smith, moved to Paris, where Alva attended a private boarding school in Neuilly-sur-Seine. Following the Civil War, the Smith family returned to New York, where Phoebe died in 1871. The family had financial trouble at this point, accentuated by the expectation that the four daughters needed to marry.

== Personal life ==
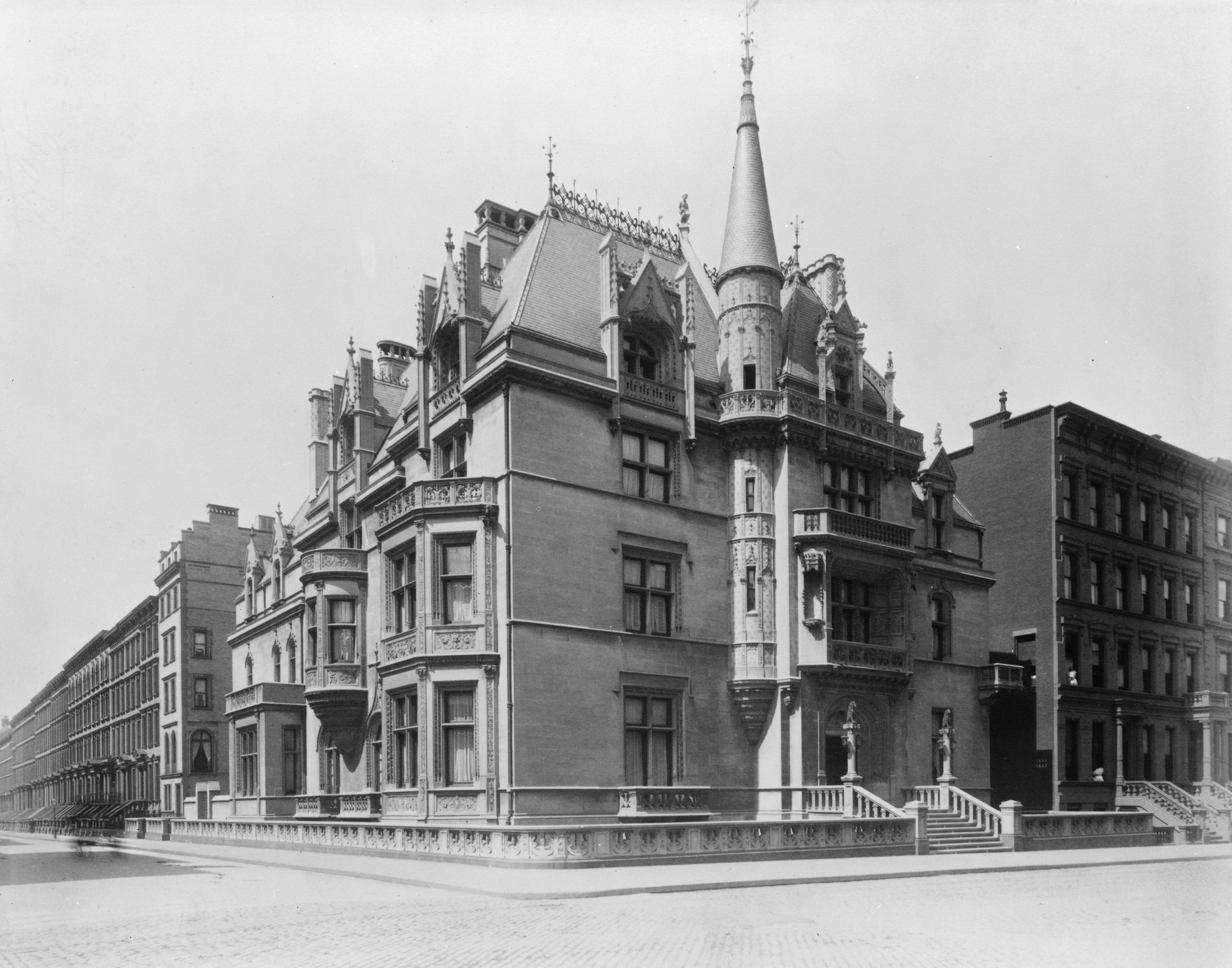
The Vanderbilts' Petit Chateau at 660 Fifth Avenue in Manhattan

At a party for one of William Henry Vanderbilt's daughters, Smith's best friend, Consuelo Yznaga introduced her to William Kissam Vanderbilt, grandson of Cornelius Vanderbilt. On April 20, 1875, William and Alva were married at Calvary Church in New York City. Alva married William for money: she described it as her attempt to help her family avoid bankruptcy, but others gossiped that she did it for her own wealth and status.

The couple had three children:

- Consuelo Vanderbilt (March 2, 1877 – December 6, 1964)
- William Kissam Vanderbilt II (October 26, 1878 – January 8, 1944)
- Harold Stirling Vanderbilt (July 6, 1884 – July 4, 1970)

Alva maneuvered Consuelo into marrying Charles Spencer-Churchill, 9th Duke of Marlborough, on November 6, 1895. The marriage was annulled much later, at the Duke's request and with Consuelo's assent, in May 1921. The annulment was fully supported by Alva, who testified that she had forced Consuelo into the marriage. By this time, Consuelo and her mother enjoyed a closer, easier relationship. Consuelo then married Jacques Balsan, a French aeronautics pioneer. William Kissam II became president of the New York Central Railroad Company on his father's death in 1920. Harold Stirling graduated from Harvard Law School in 1910, then joined his father at the New York Central Railroad Company. He remained the only active representative of the Vanderbilt family in the New York Central Railroad after his brother's death, serving as a director and member of the executive committee until 1954.

=== Rise in society ===
==== Balls and dances, the Fifth Avenue chateau ====
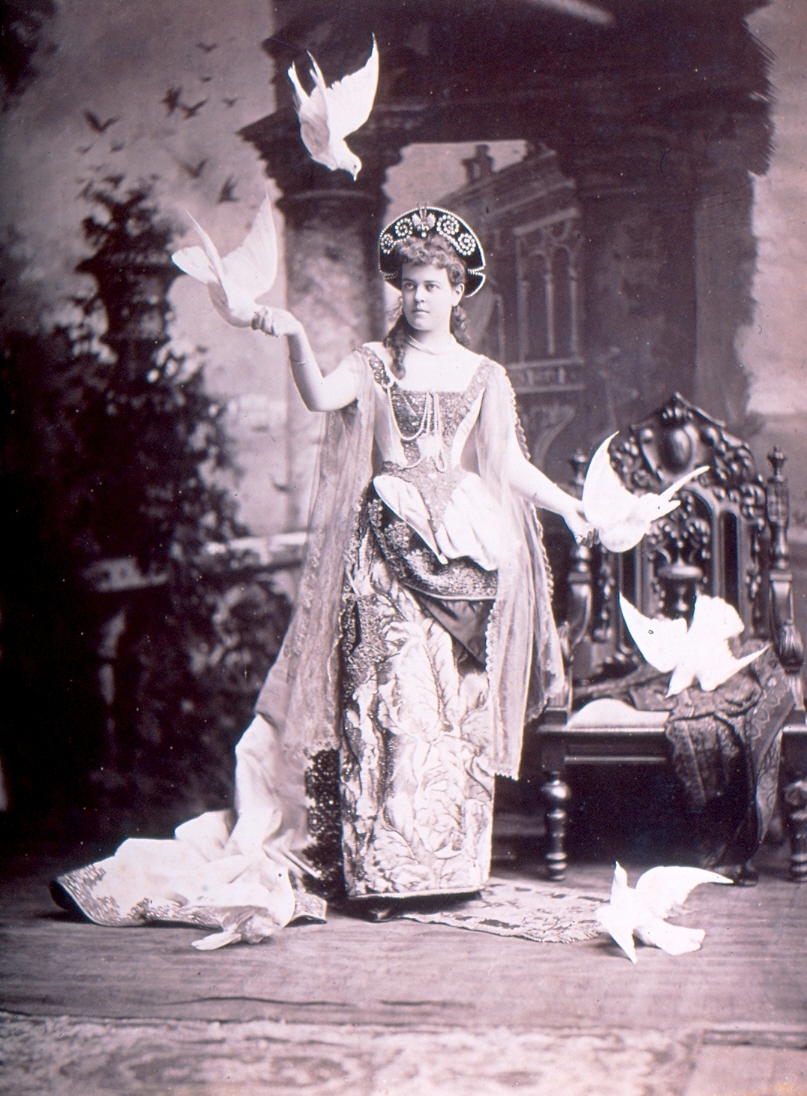
Alva Vanderbilt, costumed for her 1883 ball

Determined to bring the Vanderbilt family the social status that she felt it deserved, Vanderbilt christened the Fifth Avenue chateau–situated at the intersection of 5th Avenue and 57th through 58th Street, occupying an entire city block—in March 1883 with a costume ball for 1000 guests. "The New York World speculated that Alva's party cost [at least] more than a quarter of a million dollars, more than $5 million in today's dollars," wrote Roark et al. in 2020.

An oft-repeated story tells that Vanderbilt felt she had been snubbed by Caroline Astor, queen of "The 400" elite of New York society, so she purposely neglected to send an invitation to her housewarming ball, a dress ball of about 750 guests, to Astor's popular daughter, Carrie. Supposedly, this forced Astor to come calling, in order to secure an invitation to the ball for her daughter.

Astor did, in fact, pay a social call on Vanderbilt, and she and her daughter were guests at the ball, effectively bestowing on the Vanderbilt family society's official acceptance. Vanderbilt and Astor were observed at the ball in animated conversation. "We have no right to exclude those whom this great country has brought forward," Astor conceded, "The time has come for the Vanderbilts."

Triumphant, Alva dressed as a Venetian noble to the ball, but her sister-in-law Alice outdid her, in a costume highlighting a then brand-new invention: the electric light. Her white satin evening dress, since named the Electric Light dress, was wired for electric current, studded with glass beads in a lightning-bolt pattern, and caused a stir in the press.

The ball served as a catalyst to raise the bar on society entertainments in New York to heights of extravagance and expense that had not been previously seen.

==== Yachts, opera, "cottages" ====
Unable to get an opera box at the Academy of Music, whose directors were loath to admit members of newly wealthy families into their circle, she was among those people instrumental in 1883 in founding the Metropolitan Opera, then based at the Metropolitan Opera House. The Metropolitan Opera long outlasted the academy and continues to the present day.

In 1886, after her husband inherited $65 million from his father's estate, Alva set her sights on owning a yacht. William commissioned Harlan and Hollingsworth of Wilmington, Delaware to build the Alva at a cost of $500,000. While J.P. Morgan's yacht Corsair was 165 feet long, Mrs. Astor's Nourmahal (named after a Punjabi chateau famous at the time) measured 233 feet, and Alva's departed father-in-law's North Star was 270 feet, Alva and William's new yacht was the largest private yacht in the world at 285 feet long. The Vanderbilts subsequently toured the Caribbean and Europe on the Alva in the highest fashion.

This being done, Alva then wanted a "summer cottage" in fashionable Newport, Rhode Island. William commissioned Richard Morris Hunt again, and the elaborate Marble House was built next door to Mrs. Astor's Beechwood. In 1917 Alva commissioned Beacon Towers, which apparently was a source of inspiration to F. Scott Fitzgerald for his book The Great Gatsby. Alva's ostentatious displays of wealth helped to fuel American public interest in the lives of the rich and powerful, and, coupled with the opulent and decadent lifestyles by America's rich and their apparent disregard for the wellbeing of the working class, helped to also fuel fears that America had become a plutocracy.

=== Second marriage ===
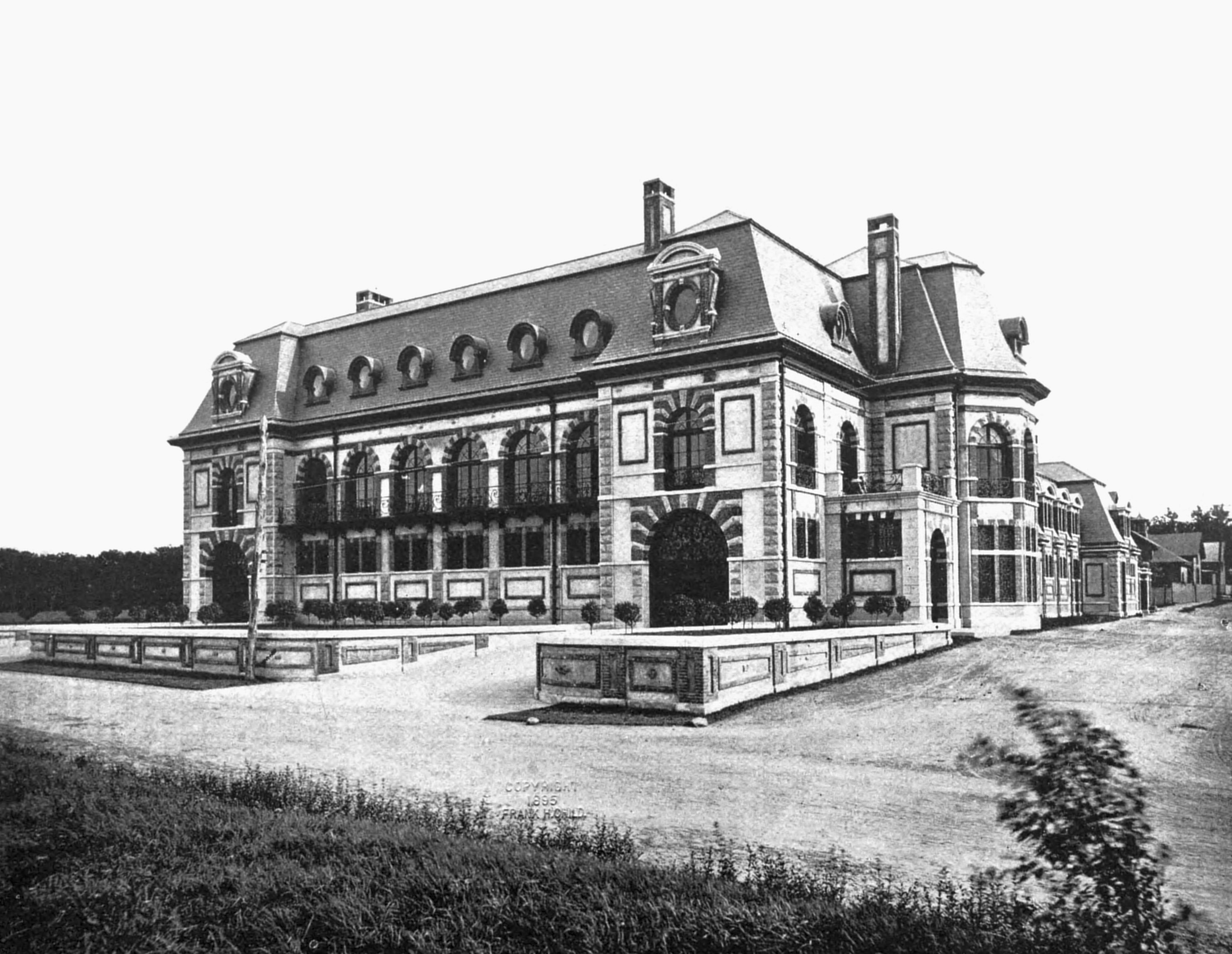
Belcourt Castle, the Belmont summerhouse in Newport, Rhode Island

Alva Vanderbilt shocked society in March 1895 when she divorced her husband who had long been unfaithful, at a time when divorce was rare among the elite, and received a large financial settlement said to be in excess of $10 million, in addition to several estates. She already owned Marble House outright. The grounds for divorce were allegations of William's adultery, although there were some who believed that William had hired a woman to pretend to be his mistress so that Alva would divorce him. Either way, Alva was unhappy in the marriage, angered by William's cheating, and now acutely aware of how precarious women's positions in marriages and workplaces were since the men with power over them did not really protect them.

Alva remarried on January 11, 1896, to Oliver Hazard Perry Belmont, one of her ex-husband's old friends. Oliver had been a friend of the Vanderbilts since the late 1880s and, like William, was a great fan of yachting and horse racing. He had accompanied them on at least two long voyages aboard their yacht, the Alva. Scholars have written that it seems to have been obvious to many that he and Alva were attracted to one another upon their return from one such voyage in 1889. He was the son of August Belmont, a successful Jewish investment banker for the Rothschild family, and Caroline Perry, the daughter of Commodore Matthew Calbraith Perry. Alva and Oliver were apparently happy in their relationship. They spent their time traveling, partying, and gardening. Alva and her friends hosted extravagant events when she was in Newport, from barn-themed costume parties to obstacle course car races. Upon Oliver's sudden death in 1908, Alva left for Europe while his estate was settled.

=== Women's suffrage ===
==== National American Woman Suffrage Association ====
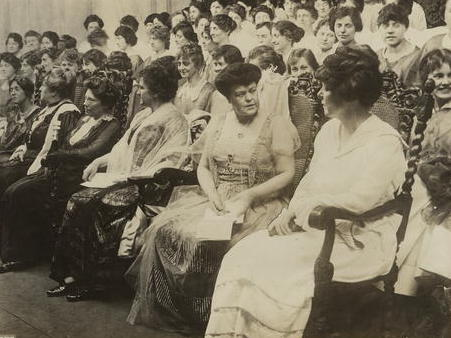
Alva Belmont (second from right) at the Women's Voter Convention in San Francisco; September 1915

After Belmont returned to the U.S. in 1909, she took on the new cause of the women's suffrage movement. Her close friend Katherine Duer Mackay had become heavily involved in the movement the year before, and Mackay invited Belmont to suffragist events. In Belmont's first meeting, she met many of the leaders of the National American Woman Suffrage Association (NAWSA), including Carrie Chapman Catt, Harriot Stanton Blatch, and Fanny Villard. Belmont attended lectures by suffragist Ida Husted Harper in 1909, and Belmont followed Harper to NAWSA meetings. Belmont later complained in her memoir that the NAWSA organizers were an old and rigid crowd who could not take action to secure rights for women. At the time, NAWSA headquarters were in Warren, Ohio, and NAWSA's longstanding strategy of winning suffrage at the state level had only resulted in victory in four states: Wyoming, Idaho, Utah, and Colorado.

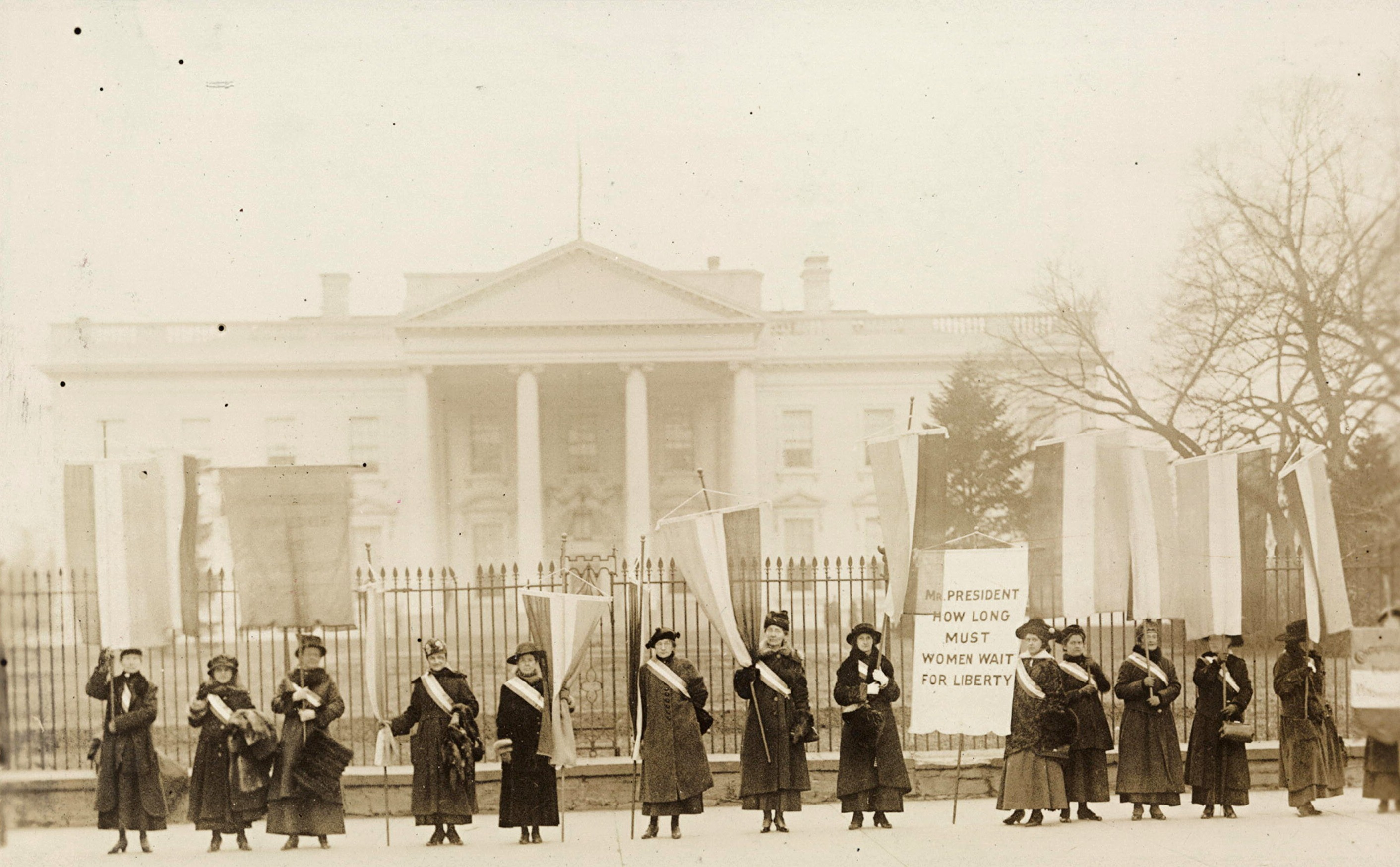
National Woman's Party members picket the White House in 1917.

Drawn further into the suffrage movement by NAWSA president Anna Shaw, Belmont soon shaped the organization through the use of her own celebrity and funds. Belmont joined NAWSA after dining with Shaw in March 1909, and Shaw sent her as an alternate delegate from New York to the International Women's Suffrage Association meeting in London in April. There Belmont observed the commitment of Emmeline Pankhurst and her followers, who adopted a militant, confrontational and protest-driven strategy of eliciting publicity for the suffragist movement. Pankhurst's organization, the Women's Social and Political Union (WSPU), had moved from working-class roots in Manchester to become a large and well-funded organization in London. By 1909, it started to be fashionable and profitable to support the suffragist cause there. Belmont felt more aligned with this style of activism than the respectable approach taken by other organizations, because she thought they attracted important publicity and inspired followers.

When Belmont returned from London, she sought to reshape the American suffragist movement in the publicity-grabbing style of the English suffragettes. In 1909, she built publicity by arranging suffragist lectures from her Newport mansion, constructing a suffragist lecture hall in her New York residence, and praising the "militant methods" of English suffragettes to reporters. Belmont paid for NAWSA to relocate to New York, covering moving fees and two years' rent for office space. She hired Ida Husted Haper and other writers to run NAWSA's new National Press Bureau from the same building. Belmont also rented offices there for her own newly-formed Political Equality Association (PEA). The PEA sought votes for suffrage-supporting New York State politicians and raised support for suffrage across New York City. Belmont's growing influence over NAWSA, against the backdrop of NAWSA's pivot towards wealthy donors, caused a series of public complaints from some NAWSA leaders. Women from the West and South resented NAWSA's move to New York and blamed Belmont. Harriet Taylor Upton and Laura Clay were especially critical of Belmont's requirements for the organization, and Upton and Rachel Foster Avery resigned in 1910 due to Belmont's changes.

==== Advocacy and foundations ====
Starting in 1909, Belmont wrote journal and newspaper articles in support of suffrage, and eventually wrote a column in the Chicago Tribune. In her writing, she linked labor protections to suffrage as two necessary tools of women's independence. During the New York shirtwaist strike from 1909 to 1910, Belmont raised strike funds with Anne Morgan, helped organize marches and a Hippodrome rally, and attended court cases for picketers who had been arrested. Belmont received mixed reviews for her actions, and the strike's labor leaders, often socialists, were concerned about Belmont's motives, while some NAWSA members worried about the connection to working-class women.

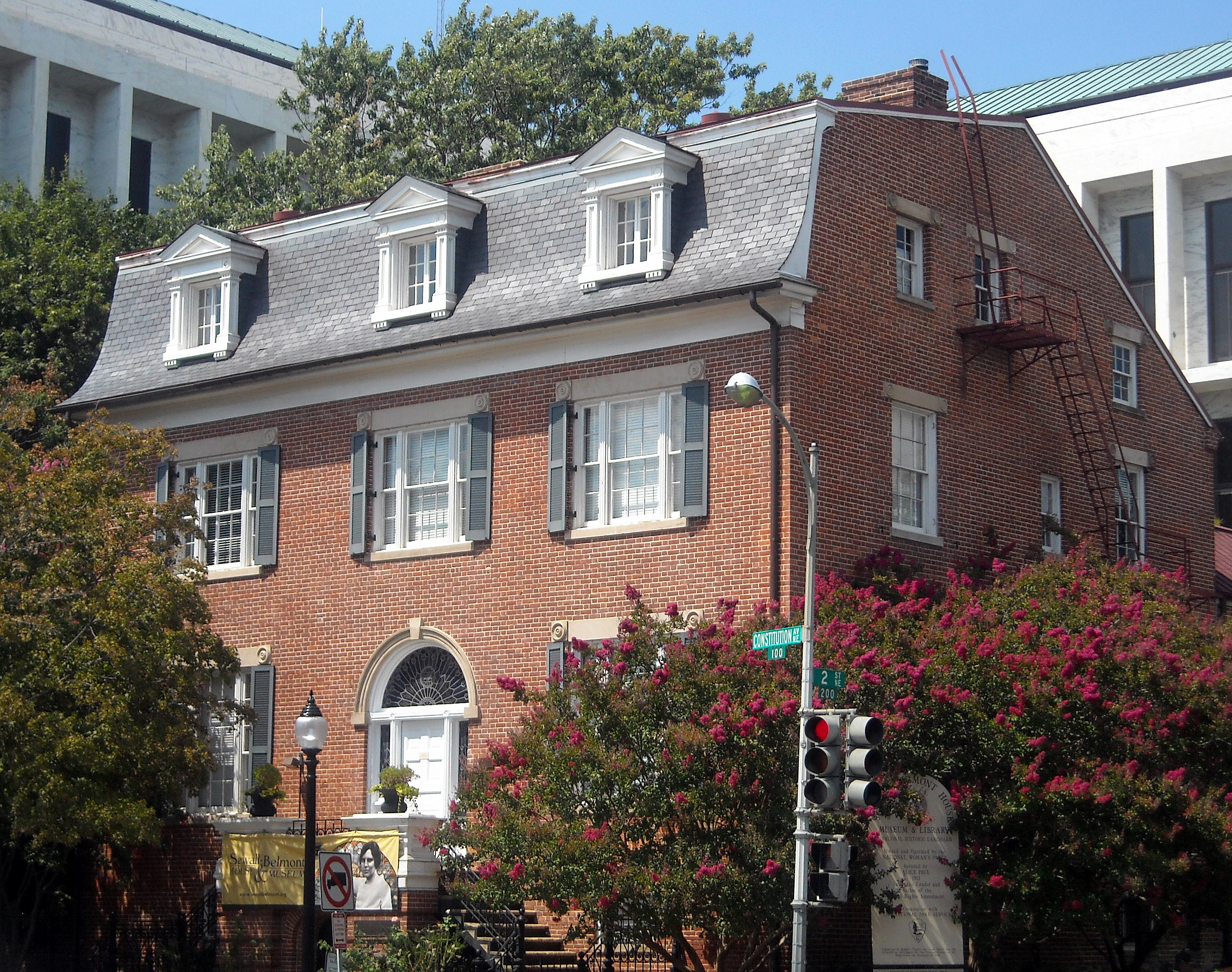
The Sewall–Belmont House in Washington, D.C.

By this time, organized suffrage activity was centered on educated, middle-class white women, who were often reluctant to accept immigrants, African Americans, and the working class into their ranks. Belmont's efforts only partially broke with this tradition. In 1910, Belmont initiated the first attempt to integrate the enfranchisement movement in New York. Working with leading clubwomen in the African American community, like Sarah J. S. Garnet, Frances Reynolds Keyser, Marie C. Lawton and Irene Moorman, she funded them in forming a Black branch of her PEA. Belmont attended two mass meetings with Black suffragists, speaking about racial equality and suffrage. She established the PEA's first "suffrage settlement house" in Harlem, and she included African American women and immigrants in weekend retreats at Beacon Towers, her estate in Sands Point. However, she also anonymously contributed $10,000 to the Southern States Woman Suffrage Conference, which refused to admit African Americans and worked against their enfranchisement.

Belmont established 11 suffrage settlements across the New York City area and a suffragist-run lunchroom providing cheap meals for working-class women. She attempted to create a farming school for urban women in 1910 with an initial class of twenty students, but the school shut down in 1912. Belmont consolidated her settlements in 1911, instead buying two Manhattan buildings to host the PEA. She also created the Department of Hygiene, a combined store and lecture hall, out of a desire to make suffragists "look their best" in the face of press stereotypes calling them ugly. As president of the PEA, Belmont led its division of New York City's 1912 Women's Votes Parade. She described the 50-block march as a physically "terrible ordeal," but reporter Marie Manning credited Belmont's presence at the parade as a turning point for political interest in the suffrage movement. That same year, Katherine McCormick began donating to NAWSA and diminishing Belmont's financial leverage over the organization.

In 1913, Belmont urged that women be given voting rights within the Episcopal Church. She attended another Hippodrome strike rally, and then contested newspaper coverage that blamed attendees for starting a riot. She also began advocating against prostitution, calling for the New York City Police Department to hire women to patrol streets and for the state to pass legislation against men involved in human trafficking. That year the WSPU escalated their protest acts in England, and while members were jailed and went on hunger strike, Belmont spoke in support of the protestors' acts of property destruction and against the jails' practice of force-feeding. She hosted Christabel Pankhurst that summer after she fled England and helped Emmeline Pankhurst when she was detained en route to the United States for a fundraising tour.

==== The Congressional Union and National Woman's Party ====
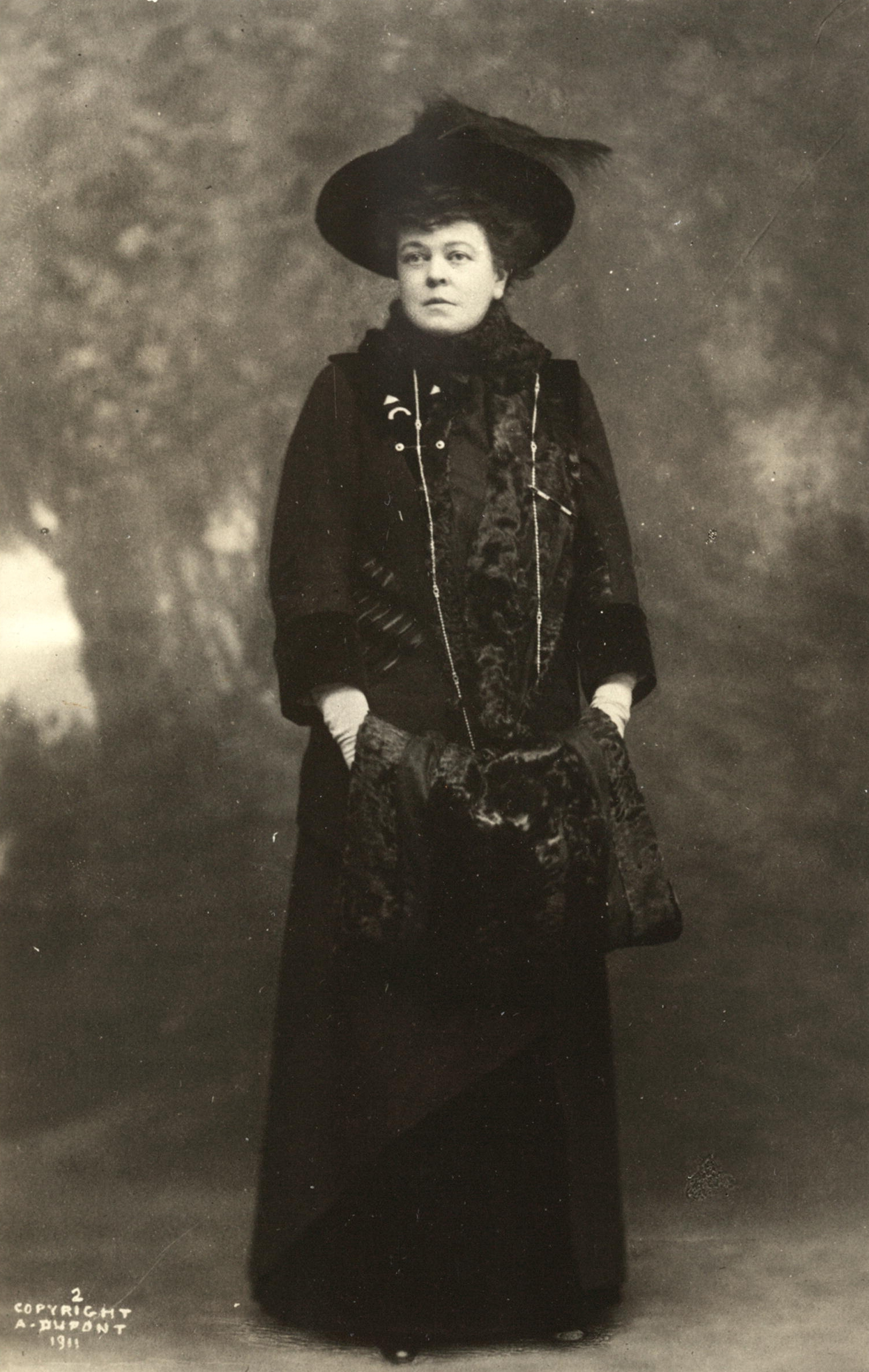
Alva E. Belmont in 1911

The Congressional Union for Woman Suffrage (CU), originally led by Alice Paul and Lucy Burns, separated from the NAWSA in 1913. At the same time, Belmont was funding Laura Clay's Southern States Woman's Suffrage Conference in Kentucky. Belmont then merged the PEA into the CU. Now committed to securing the passage of the 19th Amendment, she convened a "Conference of Great Women" at Marble House in the summer of 1914. Belmont's daughter Consuelo, who promoted suffrage and prison reform in England, addressed the gathering, which was followed by the CU's first national meeting. Belmont served on the executive committee of the CU from 1914 to 1916.

In 1915, Belmont chaired the women voters' convention at the Panama-Pacific International Exposition. The following year, she and Paul established the National Woman's Party from the membership of the CU and organized the first picketing ever to take place before the White House, in January 1917. She was elected president of the National Woman's Party, an office she held until her death. The National Woman's Party continued to lobby for new initiatives from the Washington, D.C., headquarters that Belmont had purchased in 1929 for the group, which became the Sewall–Belmont House and Museum. On April 12, 2016, President Barack Obama designated Sewall–Belmont House as the Belmont–Paul Women's Equality National Monument, named for Belmont and Alice Paul.

=== Later life and death ===
From the early 1920s onward, she lived in France most of the time to be near her daughter Consuelo. She restored the 16th century Chateau d'Augerville and used it as a residence. With Paul, she formed the International Advisory Council of the National Woman's Party and the Auxiliary of American Women abroad. She suffered a stroke in the spring of 1932 that left her partially paralyzed, and she died in Paris of bronchial and heart ailments on January 26, 1933. Her funeral at Saint Thomas Episcopal Church in New York City featured all female pallbearers and a large contingent of suffragists. She is interred with Oliver Belmont in the Belmont Mausoleum at Woodlawn Cemetery in The Bronx, New York, for which artist Helen Maitland Armstrong designed a set of Renaissance-inspired painted glass windows.

== Building programs ==
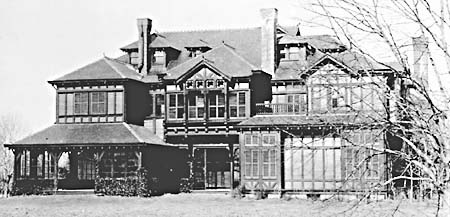
Idle Hour in 1894

During Alva Belmont's lifetime she built, helped design, and owned many mansions. At one point she owned nine. She was a friend and frequent patron of Richard Morris Hunt and was one of the first female members of the American Institute of Architects. Following the death of Hunt, she frequently utilized the services of the architectural firm of Hunt & Hunt, formed by the partnership of Richard Morris Hunt's sons, Richard and Joseph.

=== Petit Chateau ===
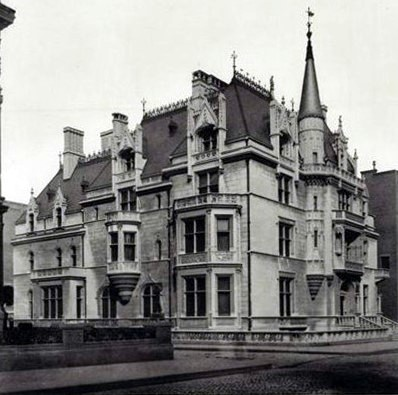
Constructed between 1878-1882 for William Kissam Vanderbilt

As a young newlywed, Alva Vanderbilt worked from 1878 to 1882 with Richard Morris Hunt to design a French Renaissance style chateau, known as the Petit Chateau, for her family at 660 Fifth Avenue in Manhattan. A contemporary of Vanderbilt's was quoted as saying that "she loved nothing better than to be knee deep in mortar." She held a costume ball that cost $3 million to open the Fifth Avenue château. It was demolished in 1929.

=== Marble House ===
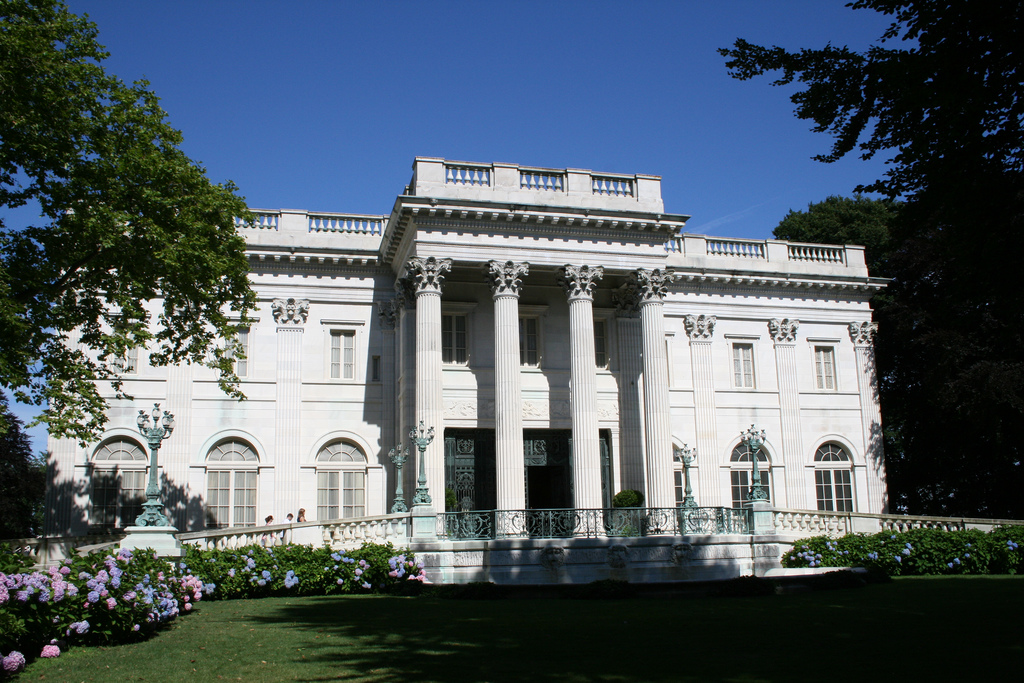
Marble House in Newport

In 1878, Hunt began work on their Queen Anne style retreat on Long Island, Idle Hour. It would be added to almost continuously until 1889 and burned down in 1899. William K. Vanderbilt had a new fireproof mansion rebuilt on the estate and it later became the home of now closed Dowling College.

Hunt was again hired to design the neoclassical style Marble House in Newport, Rhode Island, as William K. Vanderbilt's 39th birthday present and summer "cottage" retreat for Alva. Built from 1888 to 1892, the house was a social landmark that helped spark the transformation of Newport from a relatively relaxed summer colony of wooden houses to the now legendary resort of opulent stone palaces. It was reported to cost $11 million. Marble House was staffed with 36 servants, including butlers, maids, coachmen, and footmen. It was built next door to Caroline Astor's much simpler Beechwood estate.

=== Belcourt ===
After her divorce from Vanderbilt and subsequent remarriage to Oliver Belmont, she began extensive renovations to Belmont's sixty-room Newport mansion, Belcourt. The entire first floor was composed of carriage space and a multitude of stables for Belmont's prized horses. Eager to reshape and redesign Belcourt, Alva made changes that transformed the interiors of the mansion into a blend of French and English Gothic and Renaissance styles.

=== 477 Madison Avenue ===
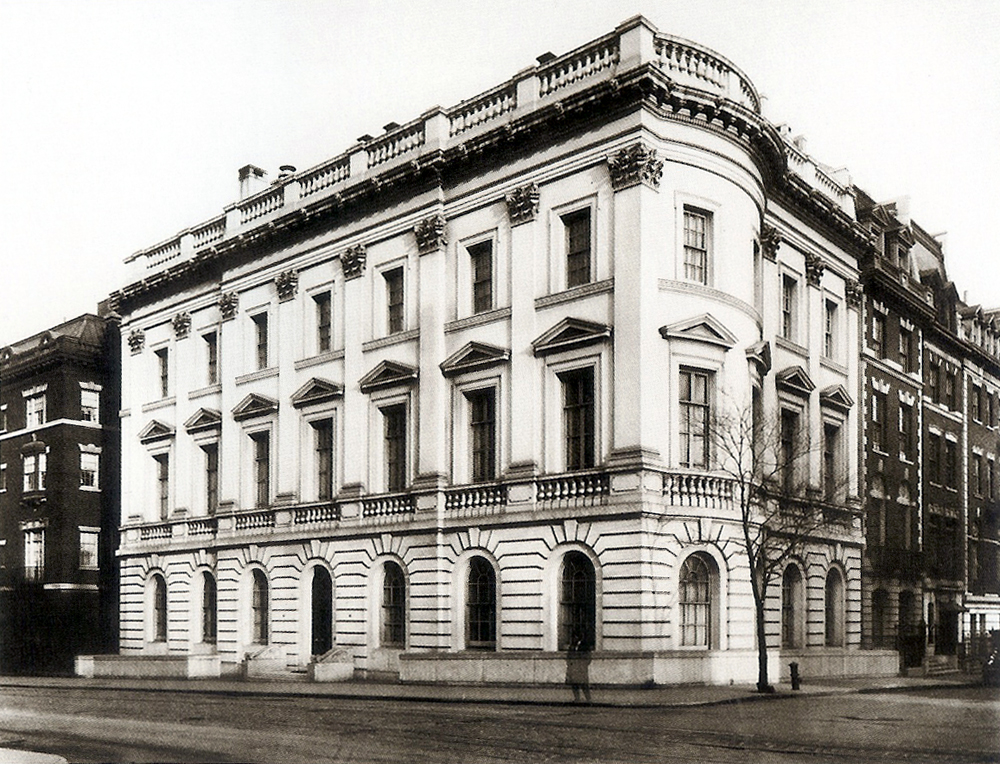
Mrs. O. H. P. Belmont House at 477 Madison Avenue and 51st Street in Manhattan

In 1899 she and Oliver bought the corner of 477 Madison Avenue and 51st Street in Manhattan. The mansion became known as the Mrs. O. H. P. Belmont House. The neoclassical three-story townhouse, designed by Hunt & Hunt, had a limestone facade and interior rooms in an eclectic mix of styles. Construction was still underway when Oliver Belmont died, when Alva announced that she would build an addition that was an exact reproduction of the Gothic Room in Belcourt, to house her late husband's collection of medieval and early Renaissance armor. The room, dubbed The Armory, measured 85 by 24 feet (25.9 by 7.3 m) and was the largest room in the house. She and her youngest son, Harold, moved into the house in 1909. The Armory would later be used as a lecture hall for women suffragists. She sold the townhouse in 1923.

=== Brookholt ===
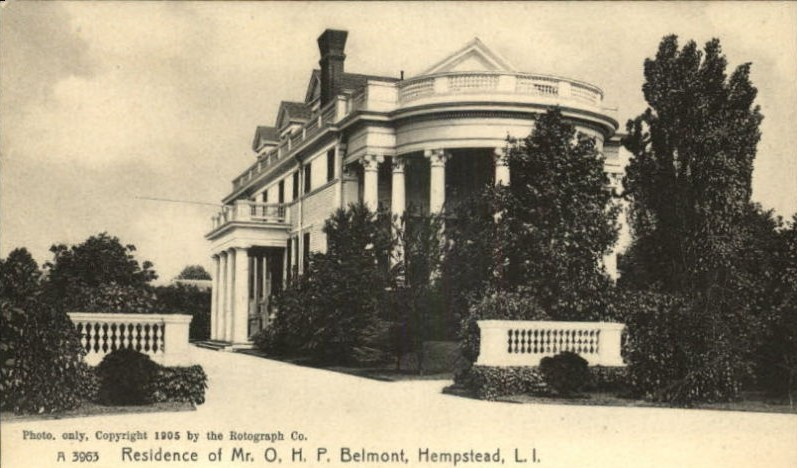
Brookholt in East Meadow, Long Island during 1905

Prior to the construction of their new Manhattan mansion, the Belmonts had another neoclassical mansion, Brookholt, built in 1897 in East Meadow on Long Island. It was designed by Hunt & Hunt. Oliver Belmont died there in 1908. For a short period, she operated the estate as Brookholt School of Agriculture for Women, a training school for female farmers. She sold Brookholt in 1915. The house was later destroyed by fire in 1934.

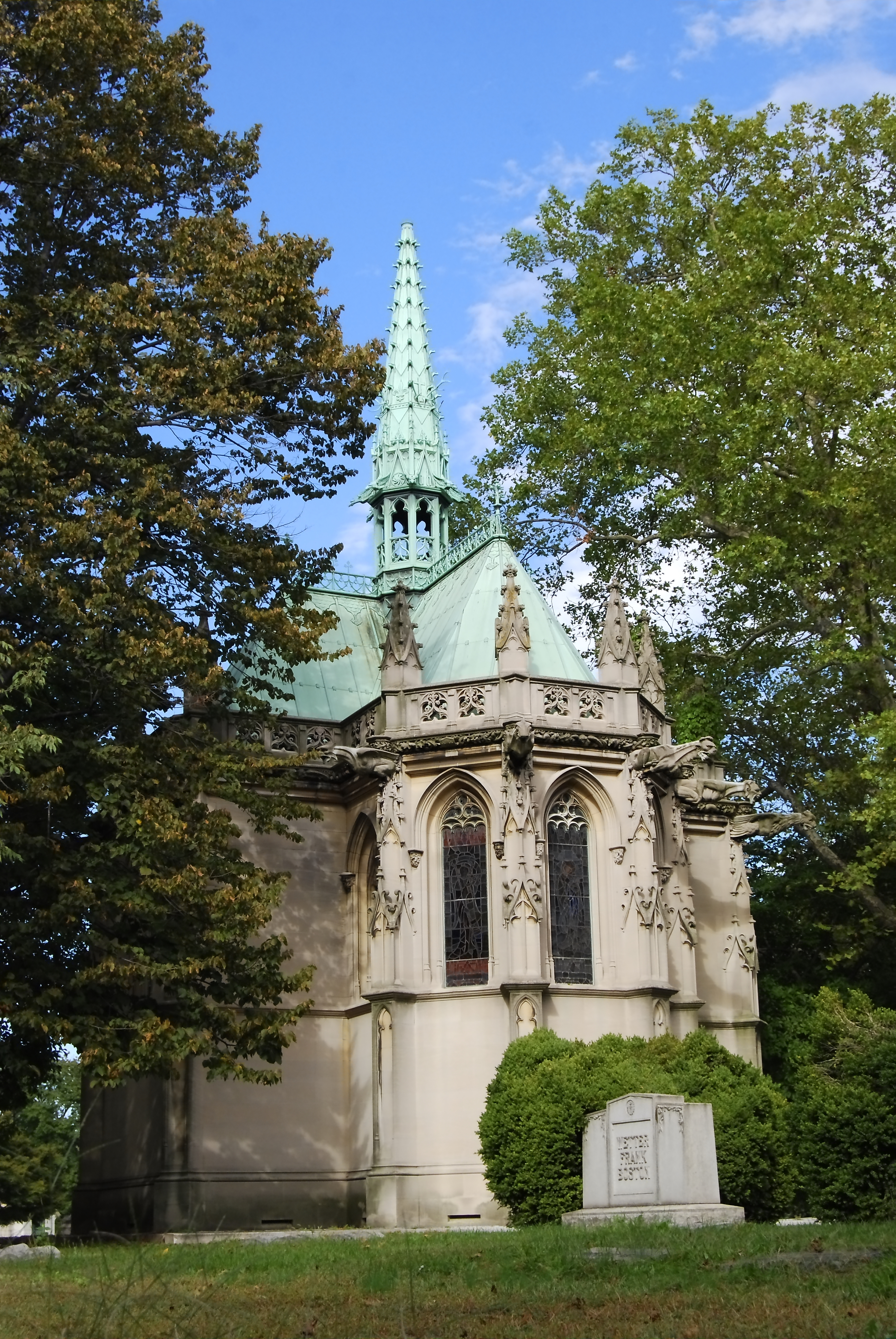
The Belmont Mausoleum in Woodlawn Cemetery

=== Mausoleum ===
Following Oliver Belmont's death, Belmont commissioned a family mausoleum to be built in Woodlawn Cemetery. Again designed by Hunt & Hunt, it was an exacting replica of the original Chapel of Saint Hubert on the grounds of the Château d'Amboise. It took several years, but construction was completed in 1913.

=== Beacon Towers ===
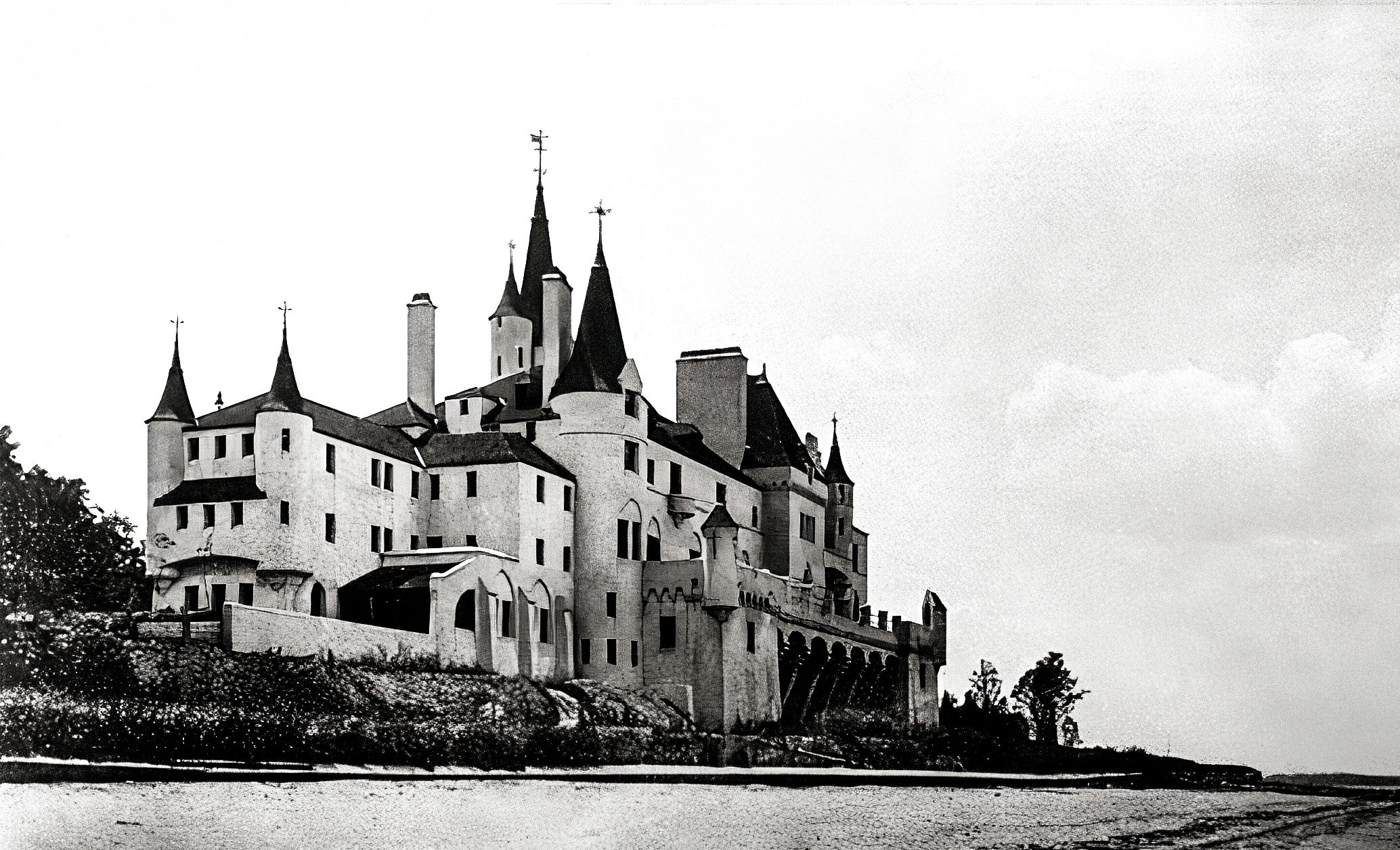
Beacon Towers in Sands Point, New York

Belmont's last new mansion in the United States was built on Long Island's North Shore. This one, Beacon Towers, has been described by scholars as a pure Gothic fantasy. It was also designed by Hunt & Hunt and was built from 1917 to 1918 in Sands Point. In 1925 Belmont closed the castle permanently; it was sold to William Randolph Hearst in 1927. He partially remodeled it and then sold it in 1942. It was demolished in 1945. It is thought by some literary scholars to have been part of the inspiration for the home of Jay Gatsby in F. Scott Fitzgerald's The Great Gatsby.

=== Château d'Augerville ===
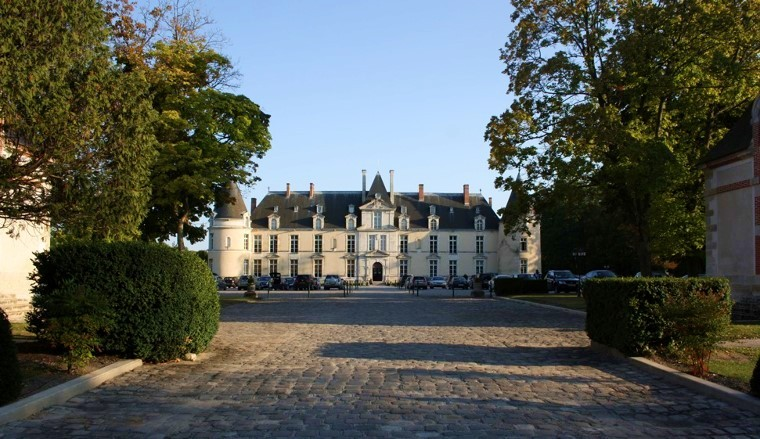
Château d'Augerville in Augerville-la-Rivière

Belmont retired to France in 1923. She had a townhouse in Paris and a villa on the Riviera. She also purchased the 15th-century Château d'Augerville in Augerville-la-Rivière, Loiret, in the summer of 1926 and restored it as her primary residence. It had been one of the inspirations for her châteauesque-style 660 Fifth Avenue house and legend had it that the chateau had once belonged to Jacques Cœur, who had left it to his daughter. Her daughter, Consuelo, wrote that she thought these two things had inspired her mother to buy the estate.

Belmont did a great deal of restoration and renovation during her ownership. She had the river flowing through the estate widened because she said, as Consuelo later wrote, "This river is not wide enough." She brought in paving stones from Versailles to cover the previously sand-paved great forecourt between the house and the village. She also built a massive neo-Gothic portal gate on the northern entrance road, separating the château and village from the surrounding farmland. Other changes included replacement of the wrought iron staircases and moving the kitchens to the basement. She also added a bowling alley in one of the houses on the estate. After her death in 1933, the chateau was left to Consuelo, who sold it to a Swiss company in the winter of 1937.

== General bibliography ==
- Lasch, Christopher. "Alva Erskine Smith Vanderbilt Belmont," in Edward James, ed., Notable American Women (1971)
- The Vanderbilt Women: Dynasty of Wealth, Glamour and Tragedy Clarice Stasz. New York, St. Martin's Press, 1991; iUniverse, 2000.
- Fortune's Children: The Fall of the House of Vanderbilt Arthur T Vanderbilt. Morrow, 1989.
- Consuelo and Alva Vanderbilt: The Story of a Daughter and a Mother in the Gilded Age. Amanda Mackenzie Stuart. New York: HarperCollins, 2005.
- The Barons of Newport: A Guide to the Gilded Age. Terrence Gavan. Newport: Pineapple Publications, 1998. ISBN 0929249062
