= East Meadow, New York =

- Hamlet and census-designated place
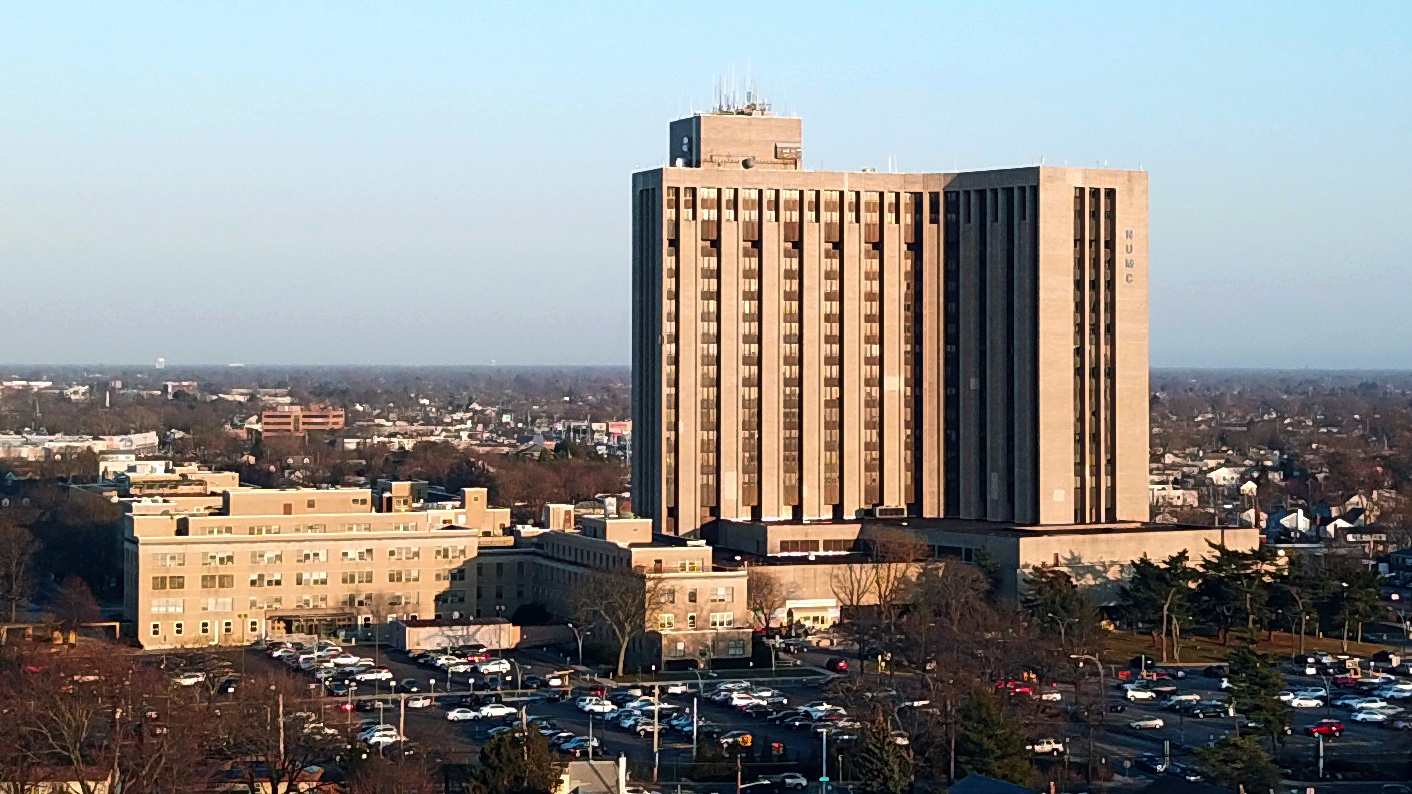
- Nassau University Medical Center – the tallest building in East Meadow

- Location in Nassau County and the state of New York

- Location on Long Island Location within the state of New York
- Coordinates: 40°42′49″N 73°33′21″W
- Country: United States
- State: New York
- County: Nassau
- Town: Hempstead

Area
  - Total: 6.33 sq mi (16.39 km^{2})
  - Land: 6.30 sq mi (16.32 km^{2})
  - Water: 0.023 sq mi (0.06 km^{2})
- Elevation: 72 ft (22 m)

Population (2020)
  - Total: 37,796
  - Density: 5,996.6/sq mi (2,315.31/km^{2})
- Time zone: UTC-5 (Eastern (EST))
  - Summer (DST): UTC-4 (EDT)
- ZIP Code: 11554
- Area codes: 516, 363
- FIPS code: 36-22502
- GNIS feature ID: 0973378

East Meadow is a hamlet and census-designated place (CDP) within the Town of Hempstead in the central portion of Nassau County, on Long Island, in New York, United States. The population was 37,796 at the time of the 2020 census.

Many of the hamlet's residents commute to Manhattan, located approximately 30 miles (48 km) to the west.

== History ==
In 1655, two surveyors for Hempstead reported that the "east meadow" would be suitable for grazing. The area quickly became a grazing area for cattle and later, in the 18th century, for sheep. The sheep of the East Meadow area provided the country with more than 50% of the United States' wool needs during that time.

During the American Revolutionary War, East Meadow was occupied by British forces when they discovered the vast amounts of livestock herded there, and remained under their control until the end of the war. Two large farms existed in what is now East Meadow: the Barnum farm (Barnum Woods), and the Carman farm. It is rumored that President George Washington spent a night on the Barnum estate during a trip across Long Island in 1790. A toll booth was operated near the Carman homestead on the Hempstead Turnpike.

Another early settlement was located near what is now the intersection of East Meadow Avenue (formerly called Newbridge Avenue; not to be confused with nearby Newbridge Road) and Prospect Avenue.

The community was home to many Gilded Era estates. The old Hoeffner homestead is now the site of Veterans Memorial park, and East Meadow's Post Office. The Barnum estate was rented by the Hoeffner family in 1914. Part of the old Barnum farm is now the site of Barnum Woods Elementary School, and the main road that passes by the school, Merrick Avenue, was originally called Barnum Avenue. The Oliver and Alva Belmont (formerly Alva Vanderbilt) estate of Brookholt once stretched across several hundred acres on both sides of Front Street to the west of Merrick Avenue, and for a short while, included the Brookholt School of Agriculture for Women.

In 1962, a sand mine located within the hamlet was the subject of Goldblatt v. Town of Hempstead, in which the United States Supreme Court upheld examined the constitutionality of municipal policing powers.

Carman Avenue is home to East Meadow High School, the Nassau County Correctional Facility, and the Nassau University Medical Center – the tallest inhabitable building in Nassau County.

In 1989, Senator Speno Memorial Park was completed, after over a decade of planning.

East Meadow was chosen to host eight cricket matches of the ICC Men's T20 World Cup in June 2024.

=== Etymology ===
East Meadow's name is derived from being the meadow of Hempstead Plains east of the Meadow Brook (originally a brook; since replaced by a parkway of the same name).

== Geography ==
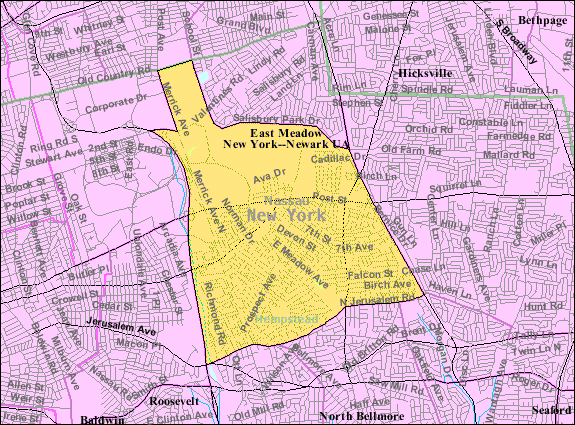
U.S. Census map of East Meadow

According to the United States Census Bureau, the CDP has a total area of 6.3 square miles (16 km^{2}), of which 6.3 square miles (16 km^{2}) is land and 6.3% is water.

East Meadow is generally flat, and according to the United States Geological Survey and the United States Environmental Protection Agency, the elevation ranges from 32 feet (9.8 m) near its southwestern edge, to 82 feet (25 m) along Hempstead Turnpike to the north.

Almost no actual meadow remains in East Meadow or the Hempstead Plains, due to the post-WWII development boom and later, unchecked suburban sprawl.

== Demographics ==
Historical population
Census	Pop.	Note	%±
2000	37,461		—
2010	38,132		1.8%
2020	37,796		−0.9%
U.S. Decennial Census

=== 2020 census ===
As of the 2020 census, East Meadow had a population of 37,796. The median age was 43.7 years. 19.5% of residents were under the age of 18 and 21.6% of residents were 65 years of age or older. For every 100 females there were 93.0 males, and for every 100 females age 18 and over there were 91.3 males age 18 and over.

100.0% of residents lived in urban areas, while 0.0% lived in rural areas.

There were 12,361 households in East Meadow, of which 32.0% had children under the age of 18 living in them. Of all households, 61.3% were married-couple households, 11.4% were households with a male householder and no spouse or partner present, and 24.3% were households with a female householder and no spouse or partner present. About 20.2% of all households were made up of individuals and 14.3% had someone living alone who was 65 years of age or older.

There were 12,951 housing units, of which 4.6% were vacant. The homeowner vacancy rate was 1.4% and the rental vacancy rate was 8.7%.

Racial composition as of the 2020 census
Race	Number	Percent
White	23,152	61.3%
Black or African American	1,801	4.8%
American Indian and Alaska Native	103	0.3%
Asian	6,825	18.1%
Native Hawaiian and Other Pacific Islander	14	0.0%
Some other race	2,689	7.1%
Two or more races	3,212	8.5%
Hispanic or Latino (of any race)	6,048	16.0%

=== 2010 census ===
As of the census of 2010, there were 38,132 people and 12,062 households residing in the CDP. (759.6/km^{2}).

The racial makeup of the CDP was according to the 2010 census, 77.3% White, 5.2% African American, 0.1% Native American, 11.6% Asian, 0.04% Pacific Islander, 1.0% from other races, 1.9% from two or more races, 12.2% Hispanic or Latino. Non Hispanic whites were 69.8% of the population. The ancestries of residents of East Meadow are Italian (28.5%), Irish (17.5%), German (11.8%), Polish (8.8%), Russian (5.8%), United States (5.0%).

Of the 12,186 households, 35.8% had children under the age of 18 living with them, 67.2% were married couples living together, 9.0% had a female householder with no spouse present, and 20.8% were non-families. 17.9% of all households were made up of individuals, and 11.6% had someone living alone who was 65 years of age or older. The average household size was 2.94, and the average family size was 3.34.

In the CDP, the population was spread out, with 23.4% under the age of 18, 7.7% from 18 to 24, 30.1% from 25 to 44, 22.6% from 45 to 64, and 16.3% who were 65 years of age or older. The median age was 39 years. For every 100 females, there were 98.6 males. For every 100 females age 18 and over, there were 96.5 males.

The median income for a household in the CDP was $67,185, and the median income for a family was $74,691 (these figures had risen to $86,582 and $97,057 respectively as of a 2007 estimate). Males had a median income of $50,325, versus $35,422 for females. The per capita income for the CDP was $27,076. About 2.3% of families and 1.8% of the population were below the poverty line, including 4.1% of those under age 18 and 4.2% of those age 65 or over.

== Economy ==
Getty Oil is based in East Meadow.

Snapple was previously headquartered in East Meadow, prior to moving their corporate office. The office space is now currently occupied by the Epilepsy Foundation of Long Island.

Lufthansa United States had its headquarters in East Meadow beginning in the 1970s, after it moved from Park Avenue in Manhattan, in order to save money. In 2019, the office had 206 employees; that year the headquarters moved to Uniondale.

== Education ==
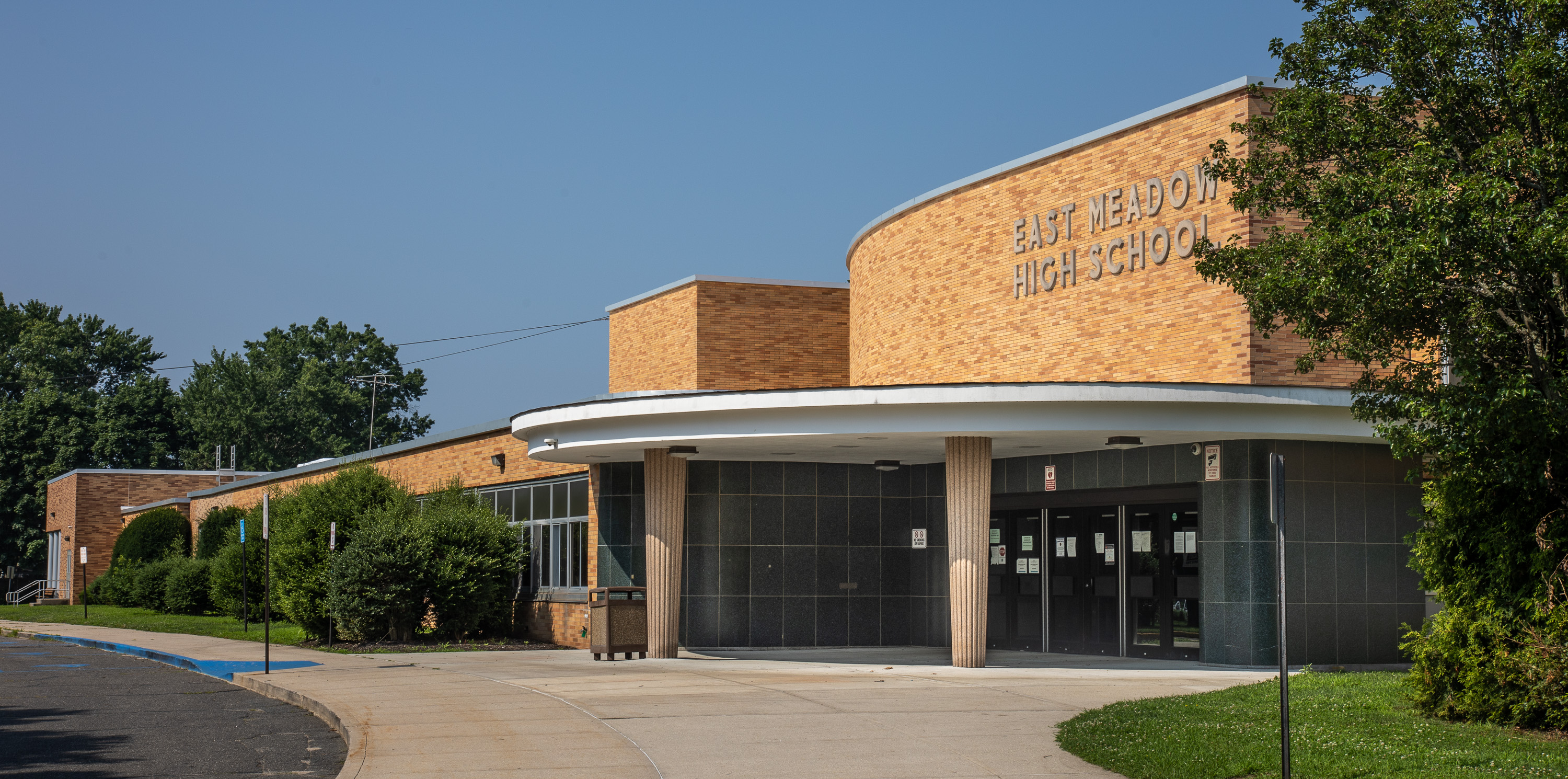
East Meadow High School in 2021

East Meadow's nine public schools are operated by the East Meadow Union Free School District, Town of Hempstead School District #3. The district was originally organized in 1812 and then formally organized as Town of Hempstead Common School District #3 in 1814 under the name "Brushy Plains", and at one time was the third largest school district in New York State. The first school building was on Front Street (where the East Meadow Public Library building stands today). Four successive schoolhouses stood at the corner of Newbridge Avenue (now East Meadow Avenue) and Front Street between 1814 and 1950.

=== Elementary schools ===
- Barnum Woods
- Bowling Green
- George H. McVey (previously Meadowlawn)
- Meadowbrook
- Parkway

=== Middle schools ===
- Woodland
- W. Tresper Clarke

=== High schools ===
- East Meadow High School
- W. Tresper Clarke High School

=== Closed schools ===
- Front Street School, once located at the corner of Front Street & East Meadow Avenue, burned down and replaced by the East Meadow Public Library.
- Prospect Avenue School, once located on the corner of Coakley Street & Prospect Avenue; students now go to Barnum Woods.
- Newbridge Road Elementary School, once located on Newbridge Road, between 7th Avenue & Lawn Drive, has been converted to condominiums. The concrete engraving reading "District No. 3 Public School" remains intact on the front of the building, now the Heritage Square apartments.
- McCleary Junior High School, previously Meadowbrook Junior High School, was located on Newbridge Road, in the lot adjacent to East Meadow's Wal-Mart. Has been replaced by a housing development.
- Salisbury School, building now serves as the district offices and alternative school

== Houses of worship ==
- Christ Alive Church, 493 East Meadow Avenue
- East Meadow Beth-El Jewish Center, 1400 Prospect Avenue, Conservative synagogue
- East Meadow United Methodist Church, 470 East Meadow Avenue
- Holy Trinity Orthodox Church, 369 Green Avenue
- Long Island Muslim Society, 475 East Meadow Avenue
- St. Raphael Parish, 600 Newbridge Road, Roman Catholic Church

== Landmarks ==
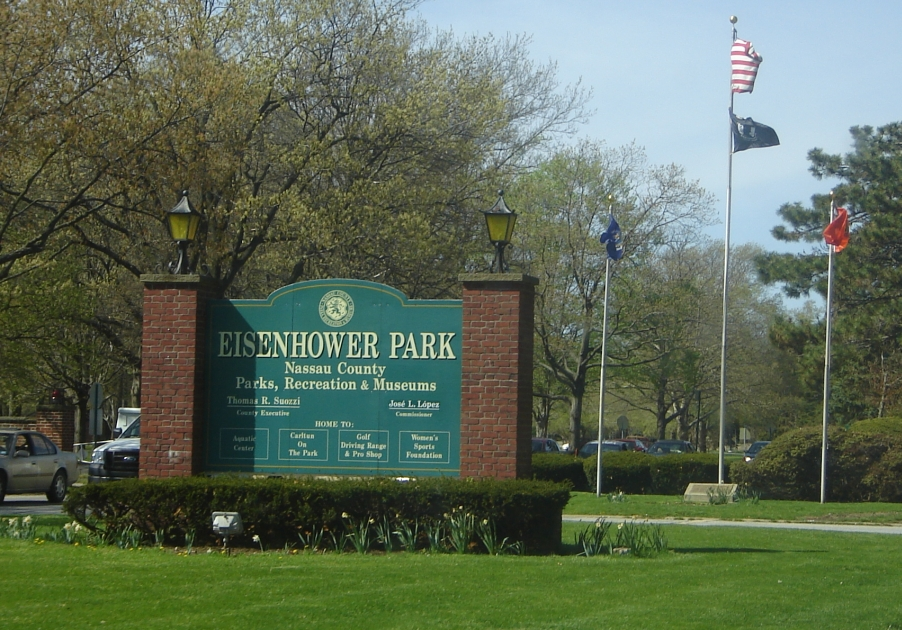
Nassau County's Eisenhower Park, seen in 2007

- East Meadow water tower
- Nassau University Medical Center, which dominates the "skyline."
- Nassau County Jail
- East Meadow Public Library
- Mitchel Manor military housing complex
- Eisenhower Park, which holds many events such as cultural nights, free concerts, the Carltun, and the attraction Safety Town

== Movies filmed in East Meadow ==
- The Hot Rock (1972, dir. Peter Yates), aka "How to Steal a Diamond in Four Uneasy Lessons", footage filmed at the prison, showing the high school in the background.
- Let the Good Times Roll (1973, dir. Robert Abel and Sidney Levin), footage filmed in Modell's.
- The Long Island Cannibal Massacre (1980, dir. Nathan Schiff)
- Compromising Positions (1985, dir. Frank Perry)
- Married to the Mob (1988, dir. Jonathan Demme)
- Pieces of April (2003, dir. Peter Hedges), scene in car with Krispy Kreme and Wal-Mart in background on Hempstead Turnpike.
- September 12th (2005, dir. John Touhey)
- Morning Glory (2010, dir. Roger Michell)
- The Smurfs (2011, dir. Raja Gosnell)
- The Bourne Legacy (2012, dir. Tony Gilroy)
- Bridge and Tunnel (2014, dir. Jason Michael Brescia)
- The Comedian (2016, dir. Taylor Hackford)
- The Instigators (2024, dir. Doug Liman)

== Notable people ==
- Eleanor Roosevelt, First Lady of the United States
- Criss Angel, magician-illusionist, stunt performer
- Arjun Atwal, PGA Tour golfer
- Adam Busch, actor-singer
- John Danowski, Duke lacrosse coach, three NCAA Championship titles
- Matt Doherty, player and head coach for the North Carolina Tar Heels men's basketball team.
- Jim Drucker, former Commissioner of the Continental Basketball Association, former Commissioner of the Arena Football League, and founder of NewKadia Comics
- Julius Erving, basketball player
- Sam Farber, industrial designer and businessman
- William Fichtner, actor
- Raymond Gniewek, violinist
- Richard Greenberg, Broadway playwright
- Ron Heller, NFL coach and former offensive tackle
- Donald E. Ingber, cell biologist and bioengineer
- Jordan Katz, musician
- Arthur Kurzweil, author, educator, editor, writer, publisher, and illusionist
- Annet Mahendru, actress
- Joy Mangano, entrepreneur, inventor of "Miracle Mop"
- Brandon Moore, NFL player and college football coach
- Rob Moore, NFL wide receiver
- Sterling Morrison, guitarist & back-up singer with The Velvet Underground
- Rich Ohrnberger, NFL football offensive lineman for the San Diego Chargers
- Denis Peterson, Hyper-realist painter
- Jan Rabson, voice over actor
- Fred Reinfeld, chess player, author
- Joel Rifkin, serial killer
- Louis Sachar, author
- Matt Serra, mixed martial artist, former UFC Welterweight Champion
- Stereo Skyline, former pop punk band
- Siegmund Spiegel, architect, activist, Holocaust lecturer, and war hero
- Melinda Sullivan, dancer, choreographer, and actress
- Jenna Ushkowitz, actress (Glee)
- Frank Viola, MLB pitcher, winner of 1988 Cy Young Award
- Leslie West, musician, member of hard rock group Mountain
- Lee Zeldin, Administrator of the Environmental Protection Agency

== See also ==
- List of Census-designated places in New York
- Salisbury, Nassau County, New York

== Sources ==
- East Meadow, Its Past and Present, published in 1976 by the East Meadow Public Library
- East Meadow, Yesterday & Today, by Mary Louise Clarke, available at the East Meadow Public Library
