= Goldblatt v. Town of Hempstead =

Goldblatt v. Hempstead
- Supreme Court of the United States

Argued January 15–16, 1962 Decided May 14, 1962
- Full case name: Goldblatt, et al. v. Town of Hempstead
- Citations: 369 U.S. 590 (more) 82 S. Ct. 987; 8 L. Ed. 2d 130

Case history
- Prior: Town of Hempstead v. Goldblatt, 19 Misc. 2d 176, 189 N.Y.S.2d 577 (Sup. Ct. 1959); affirmed, 9 A.D.2d 941, 196 N.Y.S.2d 573 (1959); aff'd, 9 N.Y.2d 101, 172 N.E.2d 562 (1961); probable jurisdiction noted, 366 U.S. 942 (1961).

Court membership
- Chief Justice Earl Warren Associate Justices Hugo Black · Felix Frankfurter; William O. Douglas · Tom C. Clark; John M. Harlan II · William J. Brennan Jr. Potter Stewart · Byron White

Case opinion
- Majority: Clark, joined by unanimous
- Frankfurter, White took no part in the consideration or decision of the case.

Laws applied
- U.S. Const. amend. XIV

Goldblatt v. Hempstead, 369 U.S. 590 (1962), was a United States Supreme Court case concerning whether a town ordinance regulating a use of a property was unconstitutional under the Fourteenth Amendment, finding the law in question was constitutional as an exercise of the town's police powers.

== Summary ==
In 1962, Herbert W. Goldblatt filed a complaint against the Town of Hempstead, New York claiming that a town ordinance regulating dredging and pit excavating on his property prevented him from continuing his business and therefore takes his property without due process of law in violation of the Fourteenth Amendment. The Supreme Court conceded that the law completely prohibited a prior use by Mr. Goldblatt who had operated a gravel pit for 30 years. But the Court held that depriving the property of its most profitable use does not make the law unconstitutional.

A portion of the sand mine would later become the Town of Hempstead's Senator Speno Memorial Park.

== Background ==
Herbert Goldblatt owned a 38-acre tract within on East Meadow Avenue in East Meadow, within the Town of Hempstead. His business, Builders Sand and Gravel Corporation, had been mining sand and gravel at this site continuously since 1927. During the first year the excavation depth reached the water table causing the excavated area to fill with water. This process continued from 1927 through 1962 so that the original crater became a 20-acre lake with an average depth of 25 feet.

The town of Hempstead grew and expanded around this excavation until within a radius of 3500 feet there were 2200 homes and four public schools. In 1945 the town enacted Ordinance No. 16 in an attempt to regulate mining excavations within its limits. This ordinance provided that such pits must be enclosed by a wire fence and must comply with berm and slope requirements. Goldblatt complied with this ordinance but in 1956 the town sought an injunction against further excavation as being in violation of a zoning ordinance. The town's zoning case failed because Goldblatt was found to be conducting prior non-conforming use on the premises. In 1958 the town amended Ordinance No.16 to prohibit any excavating below the water table and to require back filling of any excavation below that level. This amendment also made the berm, slope and fence requirements more stringent.

In 1959 the Town of Hempstead filed an action to prohibit Goldblatt from further mining on the grounds that he had not complied with amended Ordinance 16. Goldblatt argued that the ordinance was unconstitutional because it was not regulatory of his business but was completely prohibitory and confiscated his property without compensation, that it deprived him of the benefit of the favorable judgment arising from the previous zoning litigation, and that it constituted ex post facto legislation. The trial court decided against Goldblatt and he was enjoined from conducting further excavations on the lot until he had complied with the new provisions of Ordinance 16.

Though the ordinance completely prohibits a beneficial use to which the property has previously been used, the question regarding unconstitutionality was resolved by the fact that if the ordinance was considered a valid exercise of the town's police powers, depriving the property of its most beneficial use does not render it unconstitutional. The ordinance was in fact found to be a valid example of the town's police powers.

== Opinion of the Court ==
Mr. Goldblatt argued that the ordinance was unconstitutional because it '1) was not regulatory of his business but completely prohibitory and confiscated his property without compensation, 2) it deprived him of the benefit of the favorable judgement arising from the previous zoning litigation, and 3) it constituted ex post facto legislation.' While Justice Clark conceded that the ordinance did prohibit a beneficial use that the property had provided previously, he stated that this fact in itself did not determine whether or not the ordinance was unconstitutional. If the ordinance is otherwise a valid use of the town's police powers, the fact that it deprives the property of its most beneficial use does not mean it is unconstitutional. Justice Clark wrote that the real question was whether or not it fell within the town's police power to prohibit further excavation below the water table. He defined police power as 'public encroachment upon private interests'. The guiding principles about police power that Justice Clark took from Lawton v. Steele, 152 U.S. 133 (1894) were: Does the public require this interference and are the remedies reasonably necessary for the accomplishment of the purpose and not unduly oppressive upon individuals?

Justice Clark addressed the question of whether the ordinance was a reasonable one by pointing out that the ordinance was passed as a safety measure. There was concern about children burrowing under the fence but there was no indication as to whether deepening the lake would increase the danger to them. There was not any information brought in the case to show that the ordinance would be costly to Mr. Goldblatt. Justice Clark pointed out that the onus was on Mr. Goldblatt to show that the ordinance was unreasonable. Justice Clark referenced past cases of Bibb v. Navajo Freight Lines, 359 U.S. 520 (1959), Salsburg v. Maryland, 346 U.S. 545 (1954), and United States v. Carolene Products Co., 304 U.S. 146 (1938), all of which were decided that similar situations regarding reasonableness had not been disproved, so he concluded that this must stand as a valid policing regulation.

On Goldblatt's claim that he was subjected to ex post facto legislation, Justice Clark responded that the regulation of excavating in this case did not undermine a previous decision in favor of Mr. Goldblatt regarding zoning issues. The making of a new ordinance regarding safety was unconnected to the old ordinance regarding zoning.

Justice Clark addressed Goldblatt's further claim that the ordinance was unconstitutional because it imposed upon him to re-fill the excavation and to erect a new fence or to face penalties or imprisonment. This claim was based on the constitutional prohibition against bills of attainder and ex post facto legislation. Justice Clark found that these were not the issues being addressed in this case; the issue was regarding further excavation, and Mr. Goldblatt would need to bring a specific suit to address these issues at another time.

== Influence on other cases ==
- Penn Central Transportation Co. v. New York City, 438 U.S. 104 (1978) - The case involves a city placing restrictions on the development of individual historic landmarks in addition to those imposed by applicable zoning ordinances without effecting a "taking" that would require the payment of just compensation.
- Andrus v. Allard 444 U.S. 51 (1979) - This case involves the confiscation of and halting the sale of protected eagle parts. The court found that this prohibition on commerce in eagle artifacts does not constitute an unconstitutional taking because the ability to sell the property is but one strand in the owner's bundle of property rights. The denial of one property right does not automatically equate a taking.
- Abraham Moskow vs. Commissioner of Environmental Management & others 384 Mass. 530 (1981) - A restrictive order of the Commissioner of Environmental Management under the Inland Wetlands Act, forbidding the dredging, filling, or other alteration of an area of wetland comprising approximately 55% of a parcel of undeveloped land, was not such an extensive interference with the use of the parcel as a whole that it constituted a taking.
