= Mrs. O. H. P. Belmont House =

Demolished mansion in Manhattan, New York

Coordinates: 40.758554°N 73.974617°W

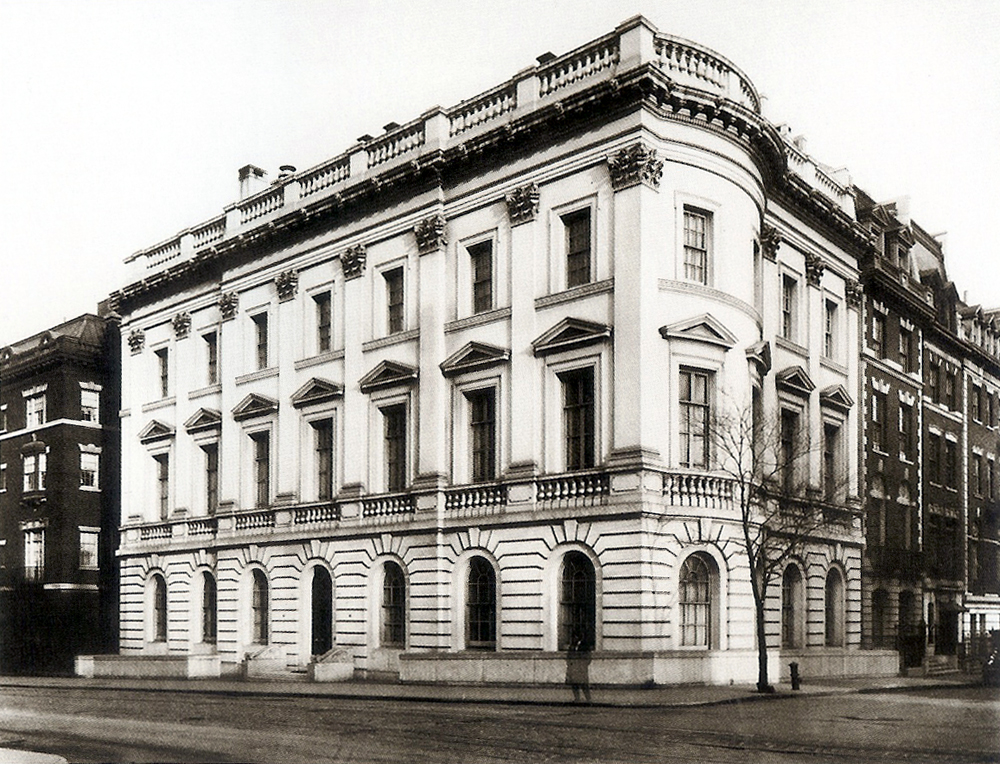
- The mansion in 1909
- Interactive map of the Mrs. O. H. P. Belmont House area

General information
- Architectural style: Neoclassical architecture
- Location: Manhattan, New York City
- Opened: 1909
- Demolished: 1951

Design and construction
- Architect: Hunt & Hunt

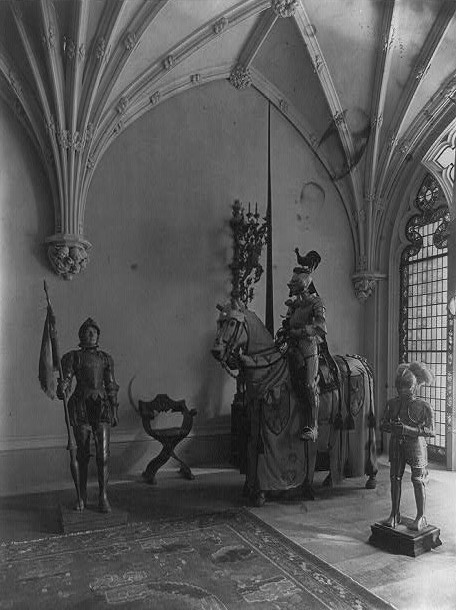
The Armory at the Belmont House

The Mrs. O. H. P. Belmont House was a mansion located at 477 Madison Avenue on the northeast corner of 51st Street in Midtown Manhattan, New York City, New York, United States. The building was demolished in 1951.

== History ==
The house was completed in 1909 for socialite Alva Belmont, the widow of Oliver Belmont. It was designed by Hunt & Hunt, formed by the partnership of the late Richard Morris Hunt's sons Richard and Joseph. The neoclassical three-story townhouse had a limestone facade and interior rooms in an eclectic mix of styles.

Construction was still underway when Oliver Belmont died, and Alva announced that she would build an addition that was an exact reproduction of the Gothic Room in Belcourt Castle, to house her late husband's collection of medieval and early Renaissance armor. The room, dubbed The Armory, measured 85 by 24 feet (25.9 by 7.3 m) and was the largest room in the house. She and her youngest son, Harold, moved into the house in 1909. The Armory would later be used as a lecture hall for women suffragists. She sold the townhouse in 1923.

The mansion was then used by the Catholic Charities of the Archdiocese of New York until the church sold it in 1951. The new owners – real-estate developers – chose to level the whole building in anticipation of a building project. In the meantime, the empty lot was used as a parking lot. The site is now occupied by a 23-story office tower designed by Kahn & Jacobs, constructed between 1952 and 1953.
