= East Meadow Beth-El Jewish Center =

- Location on Long Island, New York

Religion
- Affiliation: Conservative Judaism
- Ecclesiastical or organizational status: Synagogue
- Leadership: Rabbi Dr. Ronald Androphy
- Status: Active

Location
- Location: 1400 Prospect Avenue, East Meadow, Long Island, New York
- Country: United States
- Interactive map of East Meadow Beth-El Jewish Center
- Coordinates: 40°42′17″N 73°33′53″W

Architecture
- Established: July 1, 1953; 73 years ago (as a congregation)
- Groundbreaking: February 27, 1956

Website
- eastmeadowbetheljc.org

East Meadow Beth-El Jewish Center (EMBEJC) is a Conservative synagogue located at 1400 Prospect Avenue, East Meadow, on Long Island, New York, in the United States. Temple Beth-El of Bellmore, New York, consolidated with East Meadow Jewish Center to create East Meadow Beth-El Jewish Center. Rabbi Dr. Ronald L. Androphy has been the rabbi of the synagogue since 1983.

== Early history ==
East Meadow Beth-El Jewish Center is the consolidated entity of East Meadow Jewish Center and Temple Beth-El of Bellmore. The consolidation became official on October 23, 2020, The congregation was formed on July 1, 1953. Ground-breaking ceremonies for the synagogue took place on February 27, 1956. EMJC began with 115 founding members. Harry W. Goldin was a co-founder, president, and chairman of the synagogue's board of trustees, and Sidney Feld was a founder and president as well.

Dr. Israel Nobel was Rabbi of the synagogue in its early days (and subsequently Rabbi Emeritus), and Rabbi Irvin Beigel served at EMJC for four years in the 1980s. Paul Carus was a cantor at the synagogue in its early years, as was David Tauber. In the early 1960s, Melvin May was its assistant executive director. The synagogue membership in the late 1960s was approximately 950 families.

In the late 1980s, synagogue members protested against Soviet human rights violations. Judge Fred J. Hirsh, of the Nassau County District Court, was the EMJC Men's Club Man of the Year in 1997.

== Recent history ==
Ronald L. Androphy has been the rabbi of the synagogue since September 1983. He received his rabbinate from the Jewish Theological Seminary, and a doctorate from Harvard University.

After an alleged racial assault in East Meadow in 1989 in which a white East Meadow man was charged with beating two black teenagers with a golf club, the rabbi joined other local clerics, who said they were motivated by their conscience and felt an obligation to lead the community, in speaking out against the violence. Androphy focused on promoting greater understanding among religious groups. The synagogue's rabbi stressed the significance of the positive relationship the synagogue had with the local Methodist community. After David Levinton, a 12-year-old Jewish boy who had been a member of the EMJC, died, the local Methodist church's congregation honored the child. It voted to replace a tree that had fallen down on the church property, and dedicate the new tree to Levinton and to another non-Methodist boy in the community who had also died. In doing so, it voted down proposals to dedicate the tree to Theodore Roosevelt, Jack Kennedy, or Harry Truman.

In 2001, Charles O'Shea, a Nassau County assessor, began to enforce an 1896 New York State law requiring that special tax assessments be paid on homes bought by synagogues and churches for their rabbis and ministers. At the same time, New York State law provided houses of worship with a tax exemption on property used for religious purposes. Androphy observed:

There is a long history in this country of a separation of church and state, and the exemption of religious property from taxes. I think it's a dangerous precedent to set, because if the government can assess taxes for one purpose, what is to prevent it from assessing taxes on church and synagogue property in general? My great fear is that down the line governments might assume that the right to tax gives them the right to regulate. That would be an extremely dangerous breakdown of the separation of church and state.

Temple Beth-El of Bellmore, New York, a 70-year-old congregation, consolidated with East Meadow Jewish Center to create East Meadow Beth-El Jewish Center.

== Activities and membership ==
In addition to providing prayer services, the synagogue has a nursery school, a Hebrew school, a men's club, a sisterhood, a youth group, and adult education classes. As of 2009, the synagogue had nine torahs.

As of 2010, Ken Martin was EMJC's president, Scott Goodman was its chairman of the board, Shira Ornstein was the principal of its Hebrew school, and Silvia Kogan was the director of its nursery school.

As of 2019, the synagogue had a membership of about 350 families.
