= Oliver Belmont =

American politician (1858–1908)

Oliver H. P. Belmont
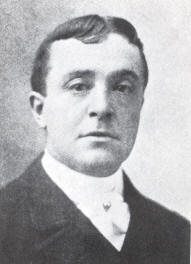

Member of the U.S. House of Representatives from New York's 13th district
- In office March 4, 1901 – March 3, 1903
- Preceded by: Jefferson Monroe Levy
- Succeeded by: Francis Burton Harrison

Personal details
- Born: Oliver Hazard Perry Belmont; November 12, 1858 New York City, U.S.
- Died: June 10, 1908 (aged 49) Hempstead, New York, U.S.
- Resting place: Woodlawn Cemetery
- Party: Democratic
- Spouses: Sara Swan Whiting (m. 1882; div. 1882) Alva Erskine Smith Vanderbilt (m. 1896)
- Relations: Perry Belmont (brother); August Belmont Jr. (brother); Matthew C. Perry (maternal grandfather)
- Children: Natica Rives Belmont Burden
- Parent(s): August Belmont; Caroline Slidell Perry
- Education: St. Paul's School; United States Naval Academy
- Occupation: Businessman, politician
- Known for: Belcourt

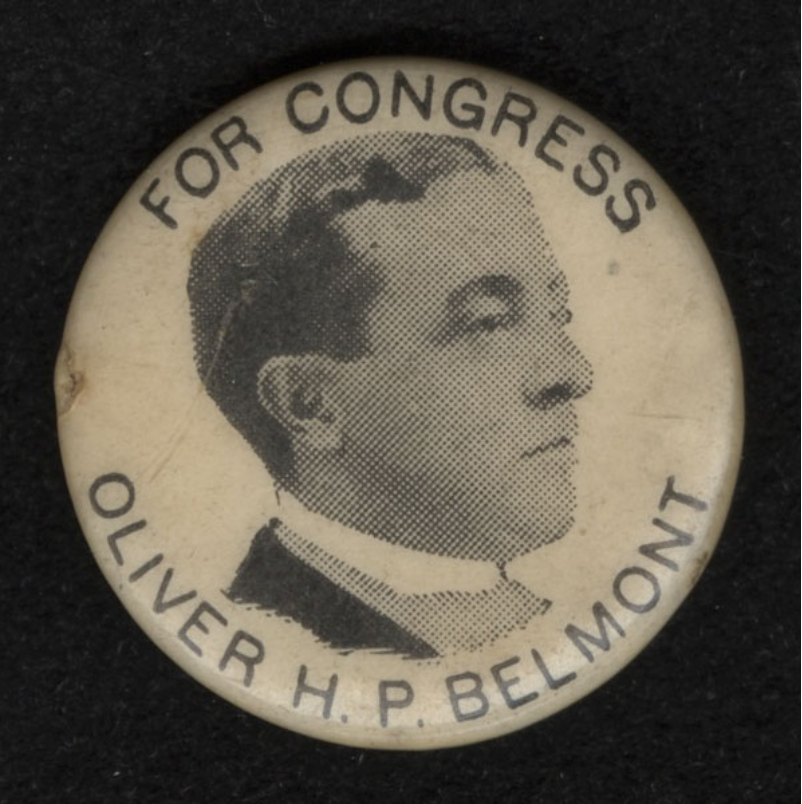
Oliver Hazard Perry Belmont lapel pin

Oliver Hazard Perry Belmont (November 12, 1858 – June 10, 1908) was an American banker, socialite, and politician who served one term as a United States representative from New York from 1901 to 1903.

Belmont was a member of the banking firm of August Belmont and Co., New York City. He became publisher of the Verdict, a weekly paper.

== Early life ==
Belmont was born on November 12, 1858, in New York City, New York. Oliver's father was August Belmont, a Hessian Jew who came to the United States in 1837 as an agent for the Rothschilds, and accumulated enormous personal wealth. The oldest race in the Triple Crown, the Belmont Stakes, is named for August. His mother, Caroline Slidell, née Perry, was the daughter of Commodore Matthew Calbraith Perry, who was renowned for commanding the naval expedition that opened Japan in 1853–54. His maternal great-uncle and namesake was Commodore Oliver Hazard Perry, the victor of the Battle of Lake Erie in 1813. Belmont attended St. Paul's School in Concord, New Hampshire.

=== Military service ===
He entered the United States Naval Academy at the age of 14 in 1874. He graduated one year late, near the bottom of his class, in June 1880. He was commissioned as a midshipman and served for one year, resigning as a Cadet-Midshipman in June 1881 while serving on the USS Trenton.

== Career ==
Belmont was a member of the banking firm of August Belmont and Co., New York City. He became publisher of the Verdict, a weekly paper.

Belmont served as delegate to the Democratic National Convention in 1900, and was elected as a Democrat from New York's 13th District to the Fifty-seventh Congress serving from March 4, 1901, until March 3, 1903. He was not a candidate for renomination in 1902.

=== Belcourt ===
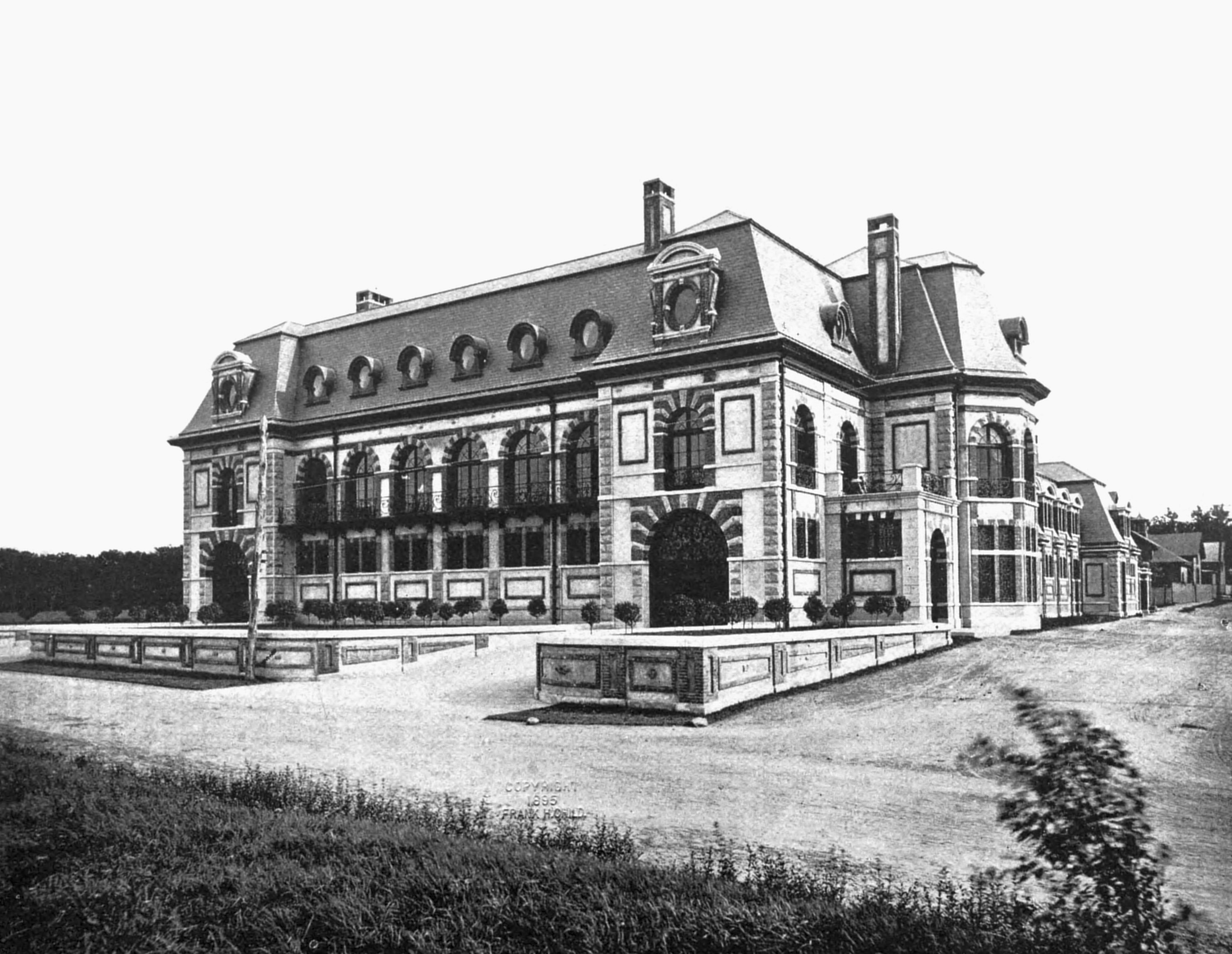
Belcourt, Belmont's summer estate in Newport, Rhode Island

Oliver received a huge inheritance when his father died in 1890. Oliver was a bachelor at the time of his father's death and decided to build a summer house in Newport. Richard Morris Hunt was the architect for Oliver's Newport mansion, Belcourt. Belmont designed Belcourt as he pleased. Hunt was hesitant with the design of Belcourt, but he concentrated on his guiding principle that it was his client's money he was spending. The first floor had stables and carriage areas incorporated into the main structure in order to accommodate Belmont's prized horses. The monumental Gothic rooms with their huge stained-glass windows were emblazoned with the Belmont coat of arms.

=== Memberships ===
Belmont was an early member of The Lambs, elected in 1887. He was a charter member of the Rhode Island Society of the Sons of the Revolution in 1896. He was eligible for membership in the Society by right of his descent from Captain Christopher Raymond Perry who served as a privateer in the American Revolution.

== Personal life ==
In 1882, without his parents' consent, Oliver proposed marriage to debutante Sara Swan Whiting, a popular and beautiful socialite. His parents, August and Caroline Belmont, objected to the engagement, thinking Oliver was not mature enough for marriage because of his gambling and playboy lifestyle. As a result, he was sent to Bremen in Germany to learn the banking trade from the Rothschild family, where his father had been trained. Oliver became dissipated and developed a penchant for absinthe. When Mrs. Belmont realized his decline, she agreed to the marriage. Oliver Belmont married Sara Swan Whiting in Newport, Rhode Island, on December 27, 1882, at her family home, "Swanhurst".

The newlyweds traveled to Paris for their honeymoon, where they were joined several weeks later by Sara's mother and two older sisters. Oliver, having originally agreed to the visit, now objected. He took to frequenting gambling houses and brothels, drinking absinthe to escape the situation. His personality was affected by the absinthe and he had a violent and abusive argument with his new wife, leaving her terrified. Oliver abandoned her in Paris and was later seen in Bordeaux traveling with a French dancer. Shamed and heartbroken, Sara and the Whiting family returned to America. In April, Sara realized she was pregnant with Oliver's child, but the two divorced and he was prevented from seeing the child. Natica Caroline Belmont (1883–1908) was born on September 5, 1883. Oliver disowned her, claiming that she was not his daughter and not a Belmont heir. Sara remarried; Natica was adopted by her stepfather, the former Assistant Secretary of State, George Lockhart Rives, and took his last name. Natica became a prominent New York socialite. In 1907, Natica married William Proudfoot Burden, the brother of James Abercrombie Burden Jr.

Belmont remarried on January 11, 1896, to Alva Vanderbilt, the ex-wife of his good friend William Kissam Vanderbilt. He had been a friend of the Vanderbilts since the late 1880s, having accompanied them on at least two long voyages aboard their yacht the Alva. According to scholars, it seemed obvious that he and Alva were attracted to one another upon their return from one such voyage in 1889. After his death, Alva took on the new cause of the women's suffrage movement.

=== Death ===
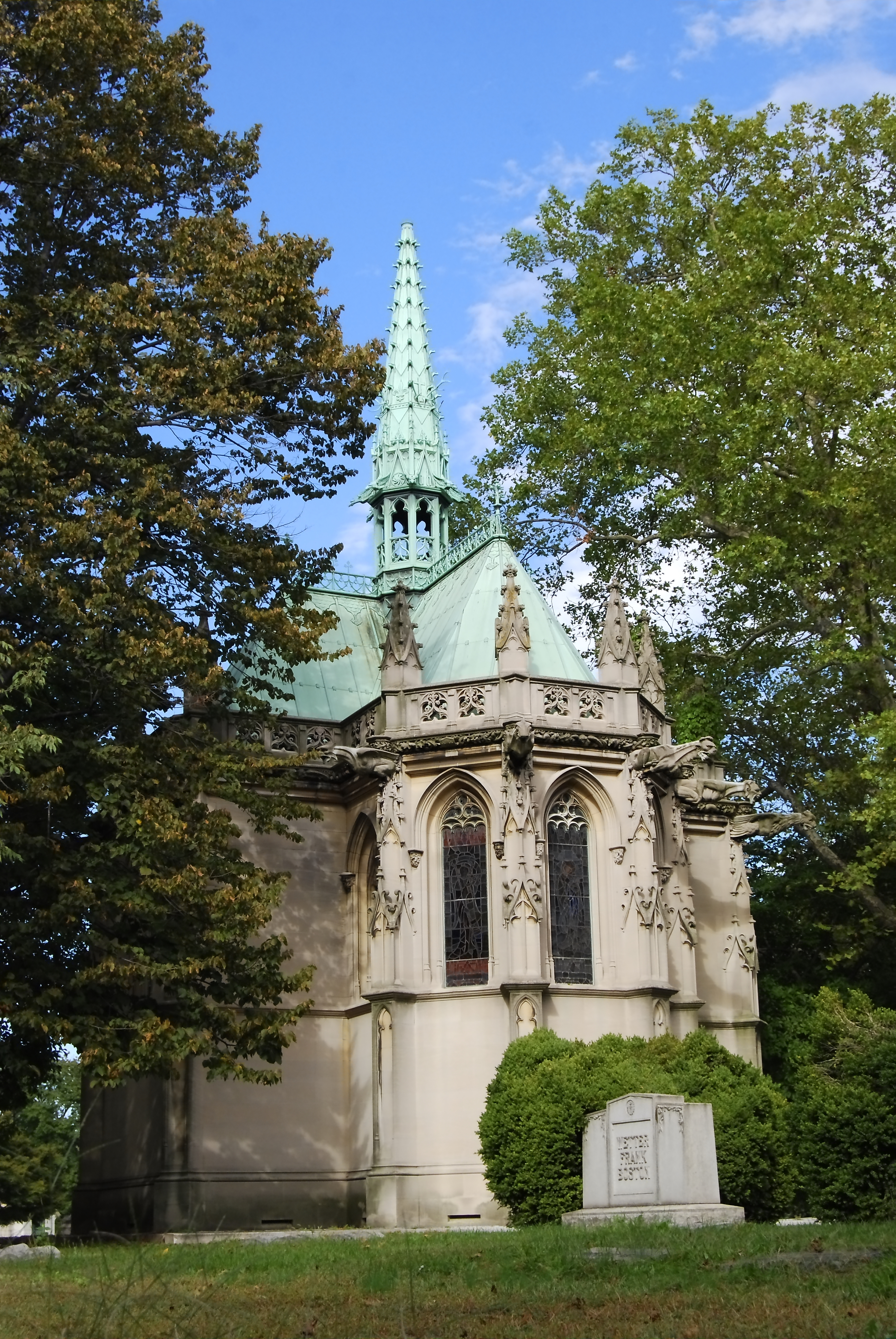
Belmont's final resting place, the Belmont Mausoleum in Woodlawn Cemetery.

Oliver Belmont died on June 10, 1908, at his Brookholt estate in East Meadow, New York, from appendicitis. He was interred in the Woodlawn Cemetery in The Bronx. His mausoleum, designed by Richard Morris Hunt, is an exact replica of the Chapel of St. Hubert at Château d'Amboise in France and features a set of Renaissance-inspired painted glass windows designed by artist Helen Maitland Armstrong. His second wife, Alva Belmont, was buried alongside him after her death in 1933.

== Attribution ==
U.S. House of Representatives
Preceded by Jefferson Monroe Levy	Member of the U.S. House of Representatives from New York's 13th congressional district March 4, 1901 – March 3, 1903	Succeeded by Francis Burton Harrison
