= Ingeborg Kindstedt =

Swedish-American Rhode Island suffragist

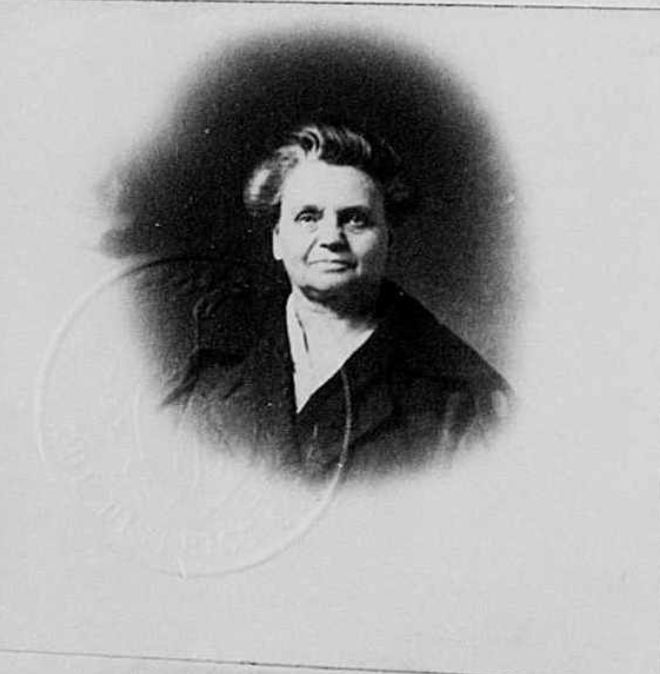
- Kindstedt 1922
- Born: Maria Ingeborg Kindstedt; May 8, 1865; Grava Parish, Värmland County, Sweden
- Died: August 5, 1950 (aged 85); Karlstad, Värmland County, Sweden
- Resting place: Ruds kyrkogård, Karlstad
- Occupations: Business owner, lecturer, maid
- Known for: 1915 cross-country suffrage envoy; Rhode Island suffrage activism
- Movement: Women's suffrage
- Partner: Maria Kindberg

Signature
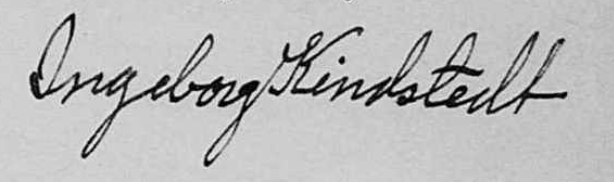

Maria Ingeborg Kindstedt (May 8, 1865 – August 5, 1950) was a Swedish-born American suffragist, lecturer, and business owner. She was a leader in the Rhode Island women's suffrage movement and one of the three women who drove the Congressional Union for Woman Suffrage's 1915 petition for a federal suffrage amendment from San Francisco to Washington, D.C., where it was presented to a delegation from the United States Congress and to President Woodrow Wilson.

== Early life and family ==
Kindstedt was born on May 8, 1865, at Trangärdstorp in Grava Parish, Värmland County, Sweden. She was one of eight children of Katarina Lovisa Kindstedt (née Svensdotter, 1836–1901) and Adam Kindstedt (1831–1906), a military musician from Karlstad, Värmland County. Her family later moved to Viken, Karlstad, Värmland County, where her father worked as a house painter.

In December 1879, aged 14, Kindstedt moved to Karlstad with her older sister Lovisa, where both worked as domestic servants in the home of Nils Fredrik Graflund, a teacher at the local seminary. They left the Graflund home together in November 1880. In September 1881, aged 16, Kindstedt was convicted of stealing a wallet containing kr20 (equivalent to kr1,399 or US$132 in 2023) from a traveling guest at Hotel Kristiania in Karlstad. She confessed to the theft and was sentenced to two months of hard labor and one year's loss of civil rights.

Kindstedt emigrated to the United States in 1890, sailing from Liverpool aboard the SS City of Paris and settling in Providence, Rhode Island. Several of her siblings also emigrated to Providence, including her sisters Lovisa and Ottilia and her brother Carl. Her nephew Arvid Leonard Kindstedt, son of her sister Anna Charlotta, also emigrated to the United States and served in the American Expeditionary Forces during World War I. (Note: Arvid Leonard Kindstedt was wounded in France in November 1917 and reported missing in action in December 1918, before returning to Providence in early 1919.)

Both her parents remained in Sweden and are buried at Östra Kyrkogatan in Karlstad.

== Life in Rhode Island ==
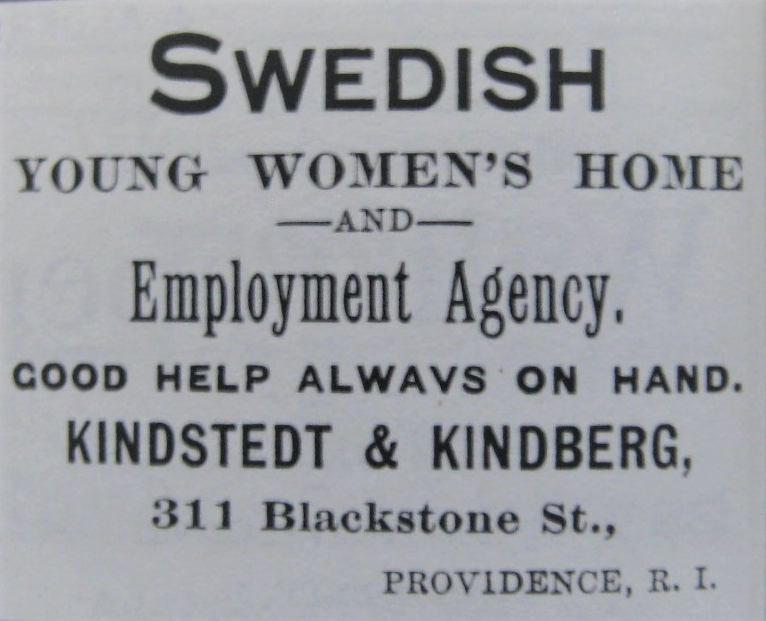
Ad for the Swedish Young Women's Home and Employment Agency

By 1895 Kindstedt was living with fellow Swedish immigrant Maria Kindberg, a midwife, at 311 Blackstone Street in South Providence, a neighborhood with a significant Swedish community. That July, Kindstedt advertised her business, the Svenska Tjenarinnehemmet (Swedish Maids’ Home), which provided placement services for domestic workers, offered board and lodging to newly arrived girls, and sold steamship tickets to and from Sweden. In January 1896 the Providence City Council granted Kindstedt and Kindberg permission to operate an "intelligence office"—a period term for an employment agency—at the Blackstone Street address; the agency was known as the Swedish Young Women's Home and Employment Agency.

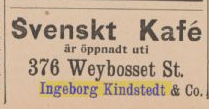
Ad for Svenskt Kafé (Swedish Café) at 376 Weybosset Street, Providence, 1897.

In September 1897 the Providence city council additionally granted Kindstedt and Kindberg a license to operate a victualing house—a licensed establishment selling food and drink—at 376 Weybosset Street. That same month Kindstedt advertised the venture in the Swedish-American press as the Svenskt Kafé (Swedish Café).

Kindstedt became a naturalized U.S. citizen on March 5, 1898, before the Circuit Court of Rhode Island at Providence.

In 1902 Kindstedt and Kindberg relocated to an apartment building at 557 Westminster Street in the West End neighborhood of Providence where they continued to operate their employment agency. In September 1903 Kindstedt announced her temporary departure for Boston, leaving the business in the care of Mrs. E. Hincks of the Reference Bureau, another employment agency active in Providence at the time. By 1906 Kindstedt had joined Mrs. Hincks's operation formally, serving as superintendent of its Swedish employment department placing cooks, maids, and waitresses.

In the 1910 United States Census, Kindberg was recorded as head of household, with Kindstedt listed as her "partner" in the relationship column. In 1912 they traveled together to Norway, sailing from New York aboard the Scandinavian American Line steamship Hellig Olav for a summer in Oslo.

== Philosophy ==
Ingeborg Kindstedt argued that women's oppression was systemic and inseparable from the power of capitalism and the church, a position she developed in essays and letters published in the Nordic-American freethought journal Forskaren. (Note: Articles from which this summary is drawn: "Kvinnans förnedring och upprättelse" ("Woman's Degradation and Restoration") (1903); "Barnarbete och de offentliga skolorna" ("Child Labor and the Public Schools") (1905); "Fria Ord, Fria Tankar" ("Free Words, Free Thoughts") (1906); "Sunt förnuft och Skrymteri" ("Common Sense and Hypocrisy") (1916).) She described church authority and private capital as "the millstones between which the poor unfortunate woman is heartlessly ground to pieces, both in body and soul."

A core element of her thought was women's bodily autonomy. She insisted that women possessed "the full right to govern her own body herself," rejecting religious and legal claims over women's reproductive and sexual lives. She emphasized that suffrage alone was insufficient, arguing that political rights meant little without economic independence and freedom from patriarchal control within marriage. She portrayed marriage as structurally akin to slavery, arguing that wives labored "as much or more than the unmarried woman who goes out and works for a steady wage" — but without pay, legal standing, or institutional support, and bearing alone the physical costs of childbirth and its complications. She linked this to broader legal double standards, citing prostitution laws under which women who accepted payment for sex were sentenced to hard labor while their male clients faced no legal consequence.

Kindstedt's critique of the church went beyond anticlericalism to a condemnation of the institution itself as a historical source of women's subjugation. She charged that the church had “giv[en] the woman entirely into the man's power” and that its arrangements had carried “poison down through the generations to our own day.” She further criticized its hypocrisy — contrasting the moral lessons about love and justice taught in Sunday school with the church's prayers for the armed forces. In 1911 she urged women to convert their standing in church congregations into a platform for agitation, arguing the church's own courtship of women's support could be turned to suffrage's advantage.

She urged parents to raise children free from “religious superstitions” that “distort and destroy their minds.” She defended the rights and wishes of nonbelievers, insisting that atheists and agnostics should not have religious rites imposed on them. In her eulogy for Karl Gustaf Lundberg — a 17‑year‑old Swedish immigrant and construction worker who fell to his death at a Providence building site — she objected to the performance of Christian burial rituals against his stated desires, criticizing those who ignored the explicitly irreligious convictions he held in life.

Kindstedt viewed women's liberation and workers' emancipation as inseparable, arguing that only socialism could dismantle the combined power of church and capital. She envisioned a future in which every woman, freed from economic dependence and religious constraint, would become "a fully-fledged human being, who has her own head, in which she carries a freely thinking brain."

== Activism ==
Kindstedt was a frequent organizer, delegate, and lecturer for the women's suffrage movement.

In 1907, Kindstedt played a leading role in establishing the Verdandi "Victoria" Lodge in Providence, a Scandinavian‑American temperance society. Nykterhetsorden Verdandi is a Swedish organization founded in 1896 on the belief that poverty and poor social conditions were the root causes of alcohol abuse. The Victoria Lodge was formally inaugurated in March 1908 and Kindstedt delivered the welcome address. (Note: The lodge was named Victoria likely in honor of Queen Victoria of Sweden (1862–1930).)

On March 3, 1910, she testified before the Rhode Island General Assembly's Senate special legislation committee on a state suffrage bill, alongside speakers Elizabeth Upham Yates (president of the Rhode Island Woman Suffrage Association) and former governor Lucius F. C. Garvin. The bill failed; a successor presidential suffrage bill was signed into law in April 1917, granting Rhode Island women the right to vote in presidential elections three years before the Nineteenth Amendment extended full suffrage nationally.

In November 1910, speaking as Deputy of the International Temperance Organization for Rhode Island, she addressed the Christian Socialist Fellowship at Providence's Franklin Society Hall, arguing that "women sinned against their own class" by accepting "a man's work for less wages" and proposing that a woman "should request equal remuneration for equal service as the man."

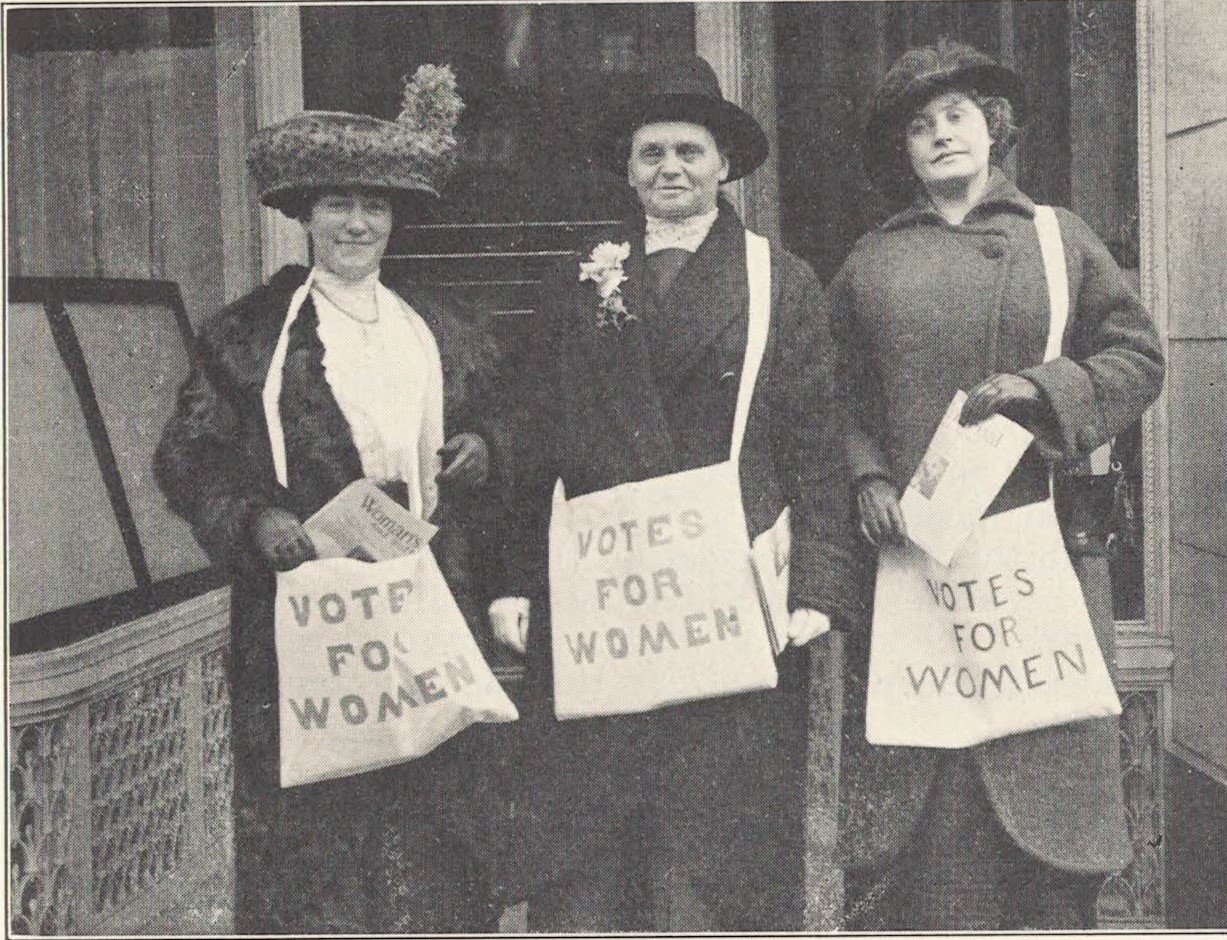
Selling the Women's Journal; Kindstedt is in the center.

Writing in the Woman's Journal in November 1913, Kindstedt reported on outreach to Rhode Island's Swedish and Scandinavian communities, noting that she had distributed suffrage literature at a Swedish National Day celebration in Eden Park on June 21, 1913, and that Swedish temperance organizations including Verdandi stood for equal suffrage.

In February 1914, Kindstedt traveled to Washington, D.C., as Rhode Island's state delegate of the Women's Political Union to meet with President Woodrow Wilson; she subsequently reported on the visit to the Women's Political Union at Verdandi Hall.

By 1914 she was serving as president of the local Women's Political Equality League (PEL), with Kindberg as its secretary. The pair hosted weekly meetings at their apartment at Westminster Street. In March 1915 league members debated militant strategies for enacting women's suffrage, including comparisons to the Dorr Rebellion—the 1841–1842 Rhode Island uprising that had challenged the state's property-based voting restrictions. A month later, however, in an April 1915 address, Kindstedt framed women's suffrage as the third great act in the American struggle for liberty—after the American Revolutionary War and the Civil War—predicting that, unlike the first two, the third would be won without bloodshed.

In August 1914 she was the principal speaker at Verdandi Hall, addressing "European Civilization and the War." Following her address, the lodge adopted a resolution declaring "the proletariat have no other enemy in the world to fight but the capitalist class."

She also publicly criticized contemporary marriage law: in December 1914 she led a PEL discussion of "the Matrimonial System"—a reform-era term for the laws and customs that subordinated wives' legal, economic, and personal standing to their husbands—comparing the institution of marriage to "a fish net with the fish outside anxious to get in and the fish inside anxious to get out."

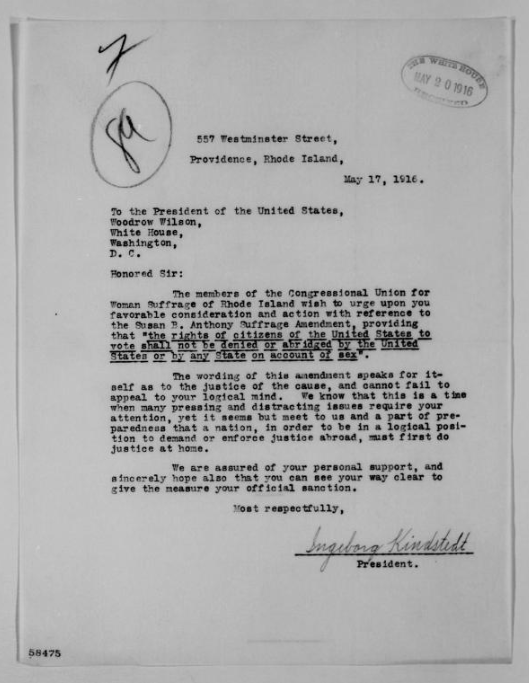
Letter from Kindstedt to President Woodrow Wilson in 1916 urging him to support the Susan B. Anthony Amendment.

In December 1915 the PEL of Rhode Island announced its intent to affiliate as a branch of the Congressional Union for Woman Suffrage (CU), later the National Woman's Party; the new CU affiliate was headquartered at Kindstedt and Kindberg's Westminster Street apartment. In May 1916, as the president of the Rhode Island CU, Kindstedt wrote to President Wilson supporting the proposed federal Susan B. Anthony Amendment. She addressed the Rhode Island CU in October 1916 in support of the Amendment.

In early March 1917, Kindstedt traveled to Washington, D.C., as the Rhode Island CU delegate to the convention at which the Congressional Union and the National Woman's Party merged, and on March 4 served as Rhode Island's banner bearer in the procession that circled the White House as the convention's closing demonstration.

In May 1917, Kindstedt and Kindberg were the principal driving forces behind the founding of the Rhode Island branch of the National Woman's Party. The branch was established at a dinner at the Narragansett Hotel in Providence attended by around 120 women and a number of men, and the newly formed association bore on its banner the inscription: "We Demand an Amendment to the United States Constitution Enfranchising Women."

== 1915 cross-country suffrage envoy ==
In 1915, the national Congressional Union, led by Alice Paul, organized a cross-country automobile journey to deliver a large suffrage petition to the United States Congress and President Woodrow Wilson. The petition measured 18,333 feet—over 3.5 miles—and contained approximately 500,000 signatures. The petition was on display at the Panama–Pacific International Exposition in San Francisco

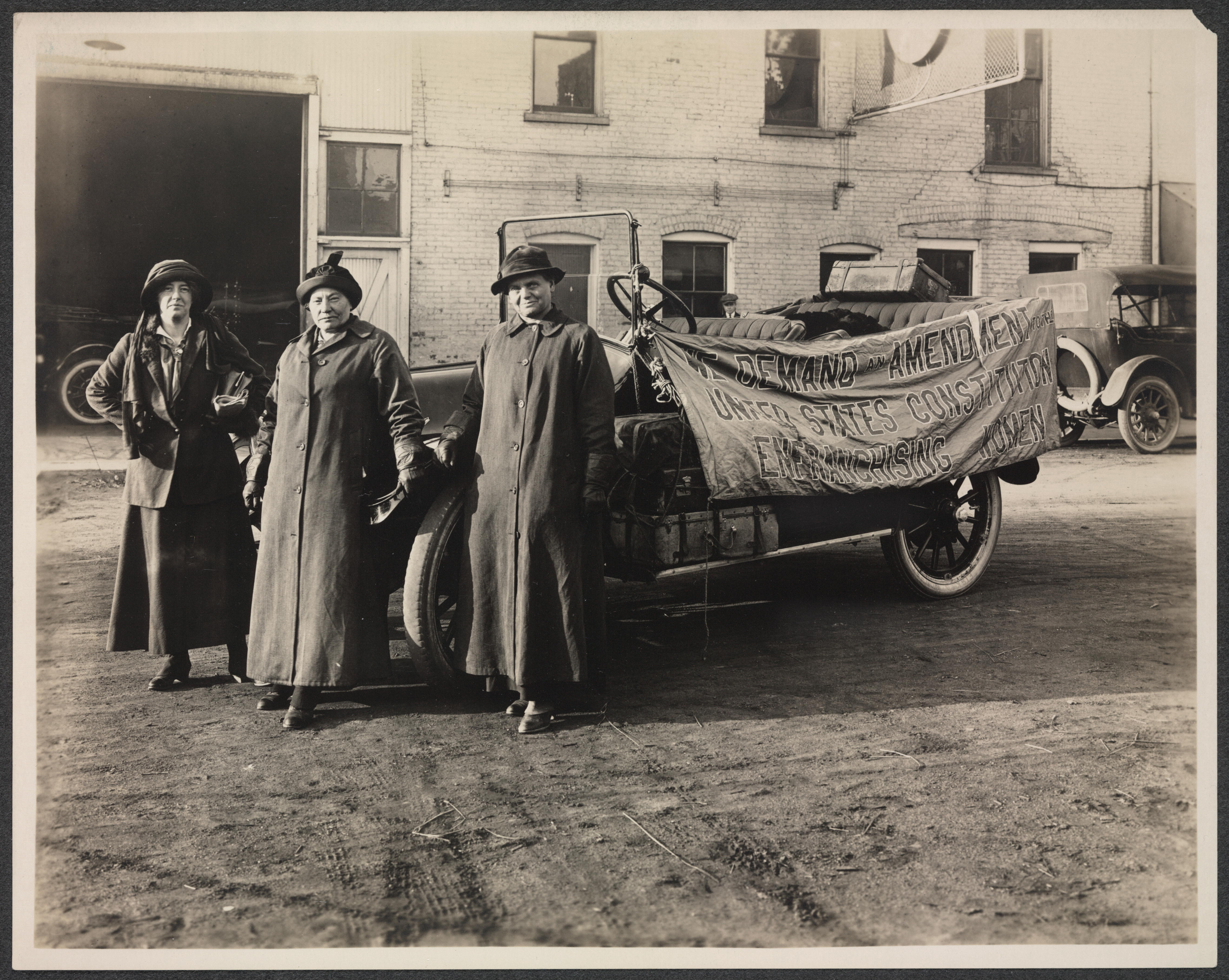
Suffrage envoy (left to right) Sara Bard Field, Maria Kindberg, and Ingeborg Kindstedt, 1915.

Kindstedt and Kindberg had traveled to San Francisco via the Panama Canal to attend the exposition. Kindberg planned to purchase an automobile in California and drive it back home to Rhode Island. Kindstedt later stated that they chose to make the cross-country trip in part to improve their knowledge of American geography. When Paul learned of their plan, she recruited them to transport the petition to Washington, D.C.

Sara Bard Field and Frances Jolliffe were selected as passenger-spokespersons. Jolliffe left the trip at Sacramento due to illness and did not rejoin the envoy until its arrival in Albany, New York. During the journey, Field served as the principal speaker, Kindberg as the primary driver, and Kindstedt as the mechanic responsible for repairs and maintenance.

The envoy departed San Francisco in an Overland Six convertible known as the "Suffrage Flier." Contemporary accounts described a large public send-off that included music and suffrage supporters.

Over the course of approximately ten weeks, the envoys crossed eighteen states and encountered desert heat, mud, snowstorms, and frequent mechanical difficulties. Kindstedt reportedly changed twelve tires and performed repeated engine repairs. The envoy reached Salt Lake City on October 4, 1915, where they were received by state and municipal officials, including suffragist Emmeline B. Wells, in a public ceremony at the Utah State Capitol. In Kansas, the automobile became stuck in mud during a storm, requiring Field to walk several miles to obtain assistance. Field later recalled interpersonal tensions within the group, including Kindstedt's dissatisfaction with being limited to mechanical duties.

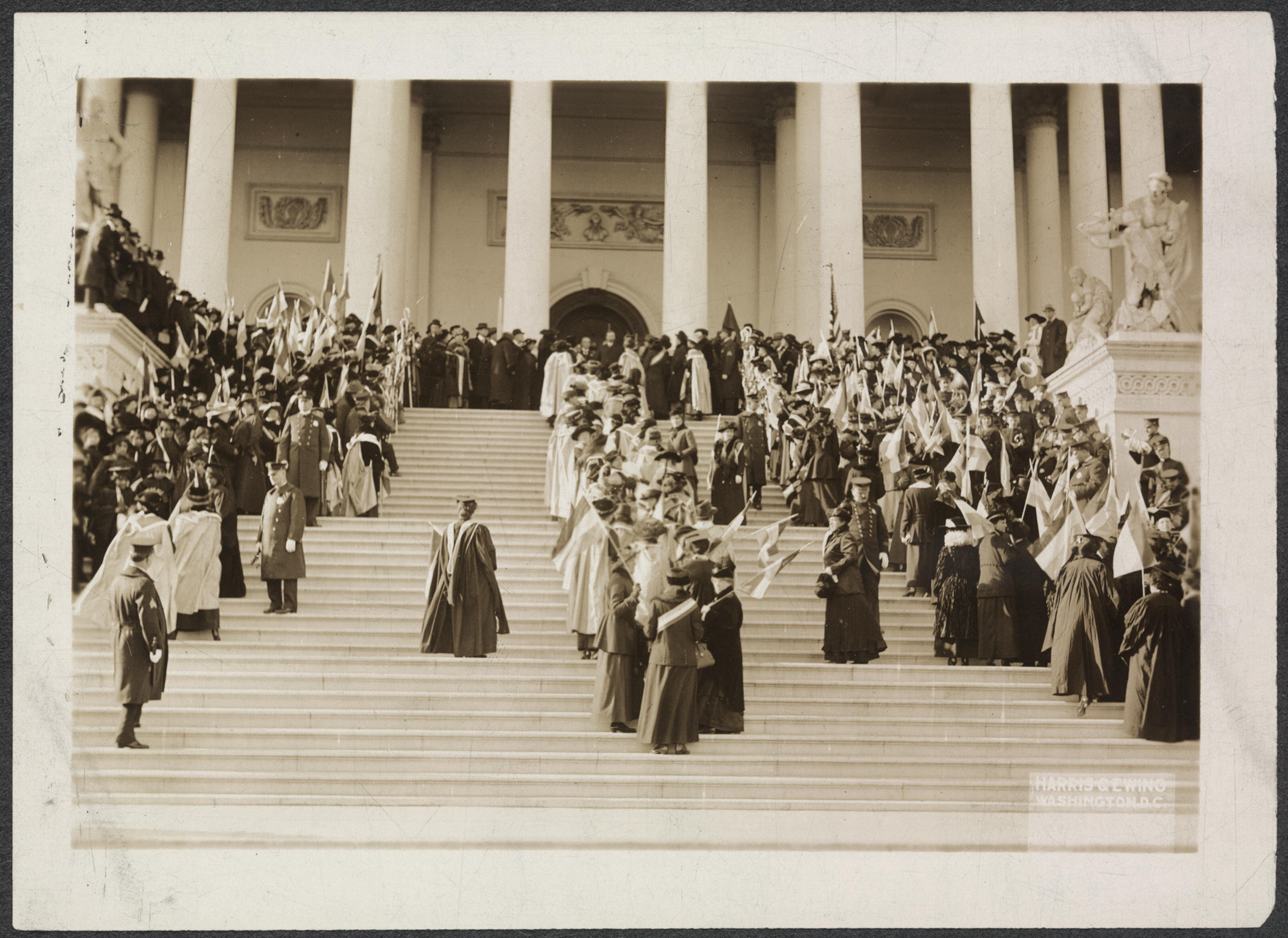
Suffrage Envoy parade on the Capitol steps, 1915.

The envoys were welcomed in Providence, Rhode Island, on November 24, 1915, by Governor Robert Livingston Beeckman at the Rhode Island State House. By that point, the automobile had traveled 6,700 miles, and Kindberg and Kindstedt were publicly recognized as the "chauffeur and mechanician for the 'Suffrage Envoy Special' automobile."

Upon arrival in Washington, D.C., the petition was escorted by a procession of approximately 2,000 women to the United States Capitol, where it was presented to a congressional delegation. A smaller group of suffragists subsequently met with President Wilson on December 6, 1915, and Field delivered a copy of the petition directly to him.

President Wilson personally thanked Kindstedt and Kindberg for their efforts, praising them by comparing them to John Ericsson, the Swedish-born engineer who designed the ironclad Monitor during the American Civil War, telling them: "I am proud of you, Swedish-American women, who have led the way with such a shining example." (Note: Wilson's words are preserved only in Swedish newspaper accounts and represent a translation and paraphrase of his spoken remarks rather than a verbatim record.) Mabel Vernon, who was present at the White House meeting, later recalled that Wilson received the envoys warmly, and that the women left feeling encouraged by his response.

== Later life, death and legacy ==
Kindstedt remained active in suffrage work until the ratification of the Nineteenth Amendment in 1920.

In 1921, Kindstedt and Kindberg applied for passports, intending to sail from New York aboard the Stockholm on April 21, 1921, to visit relatives in Sweden. However, their intended travel did not proceed as expected, and on 7 June 1921, Kindberg died by suicide. Kindstedt was listed as the informant on Kindberg's death certificate and later served as the executor of her estate. In December 1922 Kindstedt sailed from New York aboard the SS Drottningholm bound for Gothenburg, making her first return visit to Sweden since Kindberg's death.

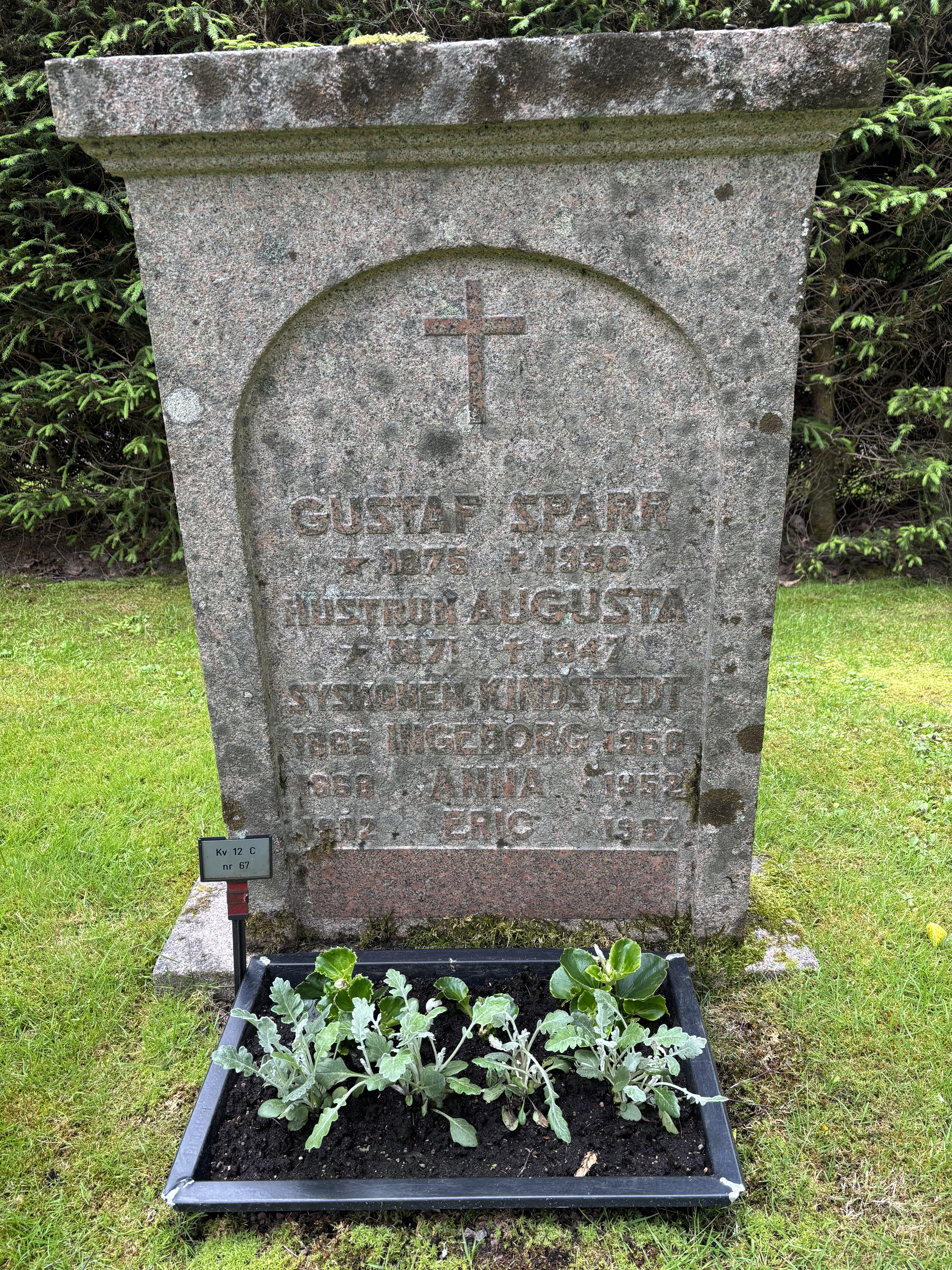
Gravestone of the Kindstedt–Sparr family at Ruds kyrkogård

Kindstedt withdrew from public activism and worked as a housekeeper in Providence. She returned permanently to Sweden in 1933 and died in Karlstad on August 5, 1950; she was buried in the family grave at Ruds kyrkogård in Karlstad, alongside her sisters Anna Elisabet Kindstedt and Augusta Linnea Sparr (née Kindstedt). (Note: The gravestone at Ruds kyrkogård lists “Syskonen Kindstedt” (“the Kindstedt siblings”) including Erik Adam (1902–1987). However, Swedish census records identify him as the son of Augusta Linnea Kindstedt, not her sibling.)

Kindstedt is recognized as a key figure in the 1915 suffrage envoy and the Rhode Island suffrage movement. Her contributions have been highlighted in modern scholarship, public history projects, and historical fiction, including historian Anne B. Gass's novel We Demand: The Suffrage Road Trip.

== Bibliography ==
=== Sources ===
- Better Days 2020 (2020). "1915 Suffrage Envoy" (PDF). Utah Women's History.
- Cassidy, Tina (2020). Mr. President, How Long Must We Wait?: Alice Paul, Woodrow Wilson, and the Fight for the Right to Vote. S&S/37 Ink. ISBN 978-1-5011-7777-4.
- "Congressional Union; Publicity; 1917". National American Woman Suffrage Association Records: Subject File, 1851–1953. Library of Congress, Manuscript Division.
- DeSimone, Russell (2020). "Rhode Island's Two Unheralded Suffragists". Online Review of Rhode Island History (Small State Big History).
- DeSimone, Russell (October 5, 2022). "Rhode Island's Long Quest for Women's Suffrage". Online Review of Rhode Island History (Small State Big History).
- DeSimone, Russell; Miller, Elisa (2015). "Biographical Sketch of Ingeborg Kindstedt, 1865–1950". Women and Social Movements in the United States, 1600–2000. Alexander Street Press.
- DeSimone, Russell; Miller, Elisa (2015). "Biographical Sketch of Maria Kindberg, 1860–1921". Women and Social Movements in the United States, 1600–2000. Alexander Street Press.
- "Barnarbete och de offentliga skolorna". Forskaren (in Swedish). XIII (7): 478–479. August 1905.
- "Fria Ord, Fria Tankar [Lundberg eulogy]". Forskaren (in Swedish). XIV (12): 459. December 1906.
- "Ny loge av N.O.V." Forskaren (in Swedish). XVI: 85. April 1908.
- "En hälsning till meningsfränder". Forskaren (in Swedish). XVI: 104. April 1908.
- "Gören kyrkorna till agitationshärdar!". Forskaren (in Swedish). XIX: 58. 1911.
- "[Borglund tribute]". Forskaren (in Swedish). XIX: 319. 1911.
- "Sunt förnuft och Skrymteri". Forskaren (in Swedish). XXIV: 168. 1916.
- Gass, Anne B. (2021). "'The Suffrage Road Trip': A Tribute to Two Middle-Aged, Lesbian, Immigrant Suffragists". Ms. Magazine.
- Gillmore, Inez Haynes (1921). The Story of the Woman's Party. New York: Harcourt, Brace.
- "Kindstedt family entry, Grava household examination book, 1861–1865". Grava kyrkoarkiv (in Swedish). Riksarkivet / Värmlandsarkiv.
- "Maria Ingeborg Kindstedt, baptism record, Grava parish, 14 May 1865". Grava kyrkoarkiv (in Swedish). Riksarkivet / Värmlandsarkiv.
- "Maria Ingeborg Kindstedt, U.S. passport application (issued 26 March 1921; renewed 4 November 1922)". FamilySearch. 1921.
- "Maria Ingeborg Kindstedt, petition for naturalization, U.S. Circuit Court, District of Rhode Island, 1898". FamilySearch. 1898.
- "Maria Albertina Kindberg, petition for naturalization, with Affidavit of Witnesses signed by Maria Ingeborg Kindstedt and Joachim F. Hartmann, 11 August 1909". FamilySearch. 1909.
- "Maria Kindberg and Ingeborg Kindstedt, 1910 US Census, Providence, Rhode Island". FamilySearch.
- "Ingeborg Kindstedt and Lars Sundquist, 1930 U.S. census, Providence, Rhode Island". FamilySearch. 1930.
- "Kindstedt, Katarina Lovisa and Maria Ingeborg, Karlstad household examination book, 1876–1880". FamilySearch (in Swedish).
- "Death record: Maria Albertina Kindberg, 7 June 1921". City of Providence, Rhode Island. 1921.
- Fry, Amelia (January 1969). "Along the Suffrage Trail: From West to East for Freedom Now!" (PDF). The American West. 6 (1). Western History Association: 16–25.
- "Kindstedt, Adam, Census 1890". Folkräkningar (in Swedish). Riksarkivet.
- "Maria Ingeborg [Kindstedt], 1880 census, Grava parish". Folkräkningar (Sveriges befolkning) (in Swedish). Riksarkivet.
- "Sara Bard Field, 1883–1974". National Portrait Gallery. Smithsonian Institution.
- "Suffrage Envoy Sara Bard Field". National Park Service.
- "Maria Kindberg (1860–1921) and Ingeborg Kindstedt (1865–1950)". Rhode Island Heritage Hall of Fame. 2020.
- "Jury Trial Calendar: Carl G. Kindberg et al. vs Ingeborg Kindstedt, Exr". Rhode Island Law Record: 388. 18 May 1922.
- City of Providence Tax Book. City of Providence, Rhode Island. 1922. p. 195.
- Sigerman, Harriet (2012). "Road Trip for Suffrage" (PDF). Teaching Tolerance / Learning for Justice.
- "Traveling for Suffrage Part 1: Two women, a cat, a car, and a mission". National Museum of American History. Smithsonian Institution.
- Smith, Sherry L. (2020). Bohemians West: Free Love, Family, and Radicals in Twentieth-Century America. Berkeley: Heyday Books. ISBN 978-1-59714-516-9.
- Smith, Sherry L. (2021). "Sara Bard Field and the Western Push for the Nineteenth Amendment". Montana: The Magazine of Western History. 71 (2). Montana Historical Society: 46–62. JSTOR 27107750.
- "Burial records of the Kindstedt family at Karlstad". Svenska gravar (in Swedish). Karlstad pastorat.
- Vernon, Mabel (1976). Speaker for Suffrage and Petitioner for Peace (PDF). Suffragists Oral History Project. Interviewed by Amelia R. Fry. Berkeley: Regional Oral History Office, Bancroft Library, University of California.
- Wayne, Tiffany K. (2021). "Mapping the Geographic and Racial Lines of U.S. Women's Suffrage". WomanWriting.com.
- Wayne, Tiffany (2022). "The Jewel City: Suffrage at the 1915 San Francisco Panama-Pacific International Exposition". Bunk History.
- "Rhode Island Women Alert [includes contribution by Ingeborg Kindstedt]". The Woman Citizen. November 1913.
- Ziegler, Mary (2008). "Eugenic Feminism: Mental Hygiene, the Women's Movement, and the Campaign for Eugenic Legal Reform, 1900–1935". Harvard Journal of Law & Gender. 31: 211–235.
- The Providence Directory. Providence, R.I.: Sampson, Murdock & Co. 1912. p. 407.

=== Newspaper articles ===
- "Stöld". Karlstadstidningen (in Swedish). September 14, 1881.
- "Energiska röstrattskvinnor". Göteborgs Handels- och Sjöfartstidning (in Swedish). February 11, 1916.
- "Women's Political Union". The Labor Advocate. Providence, R.I. February 8, 1914.
- "Stöld". Nya Wermlandstidningen (in Swedish). September 13, 1881.
- "Fröken Ingeborg Kindstedt". Nordstjernan (in Swedish). March 6, 1917 – via Minnesota Historical Society Newspapers.
- "Bemärkta svenska rösträttskvinnor". Nordstjernan (in Swedish). May 29, 1917 – via Minnesota Historical Society Newspapers.
- "Svenska Amerika Linierns ångare "Drottningholm"". Nordstjernan (in Swedish). December 15, 1922 – via Minnesota Historical Society Newspapers.
- "Kindstedt, Arvid L." (PDF). Official Bulletin. U.S. Committee on Public Information. March 13, 1919.
- "Petitions Granted". The Providence Journal. January 17, 1896.
- "Providence Tax List". The Providence Journal. June 1, 1896.
- "Judgment by Default". The Providence Journal. October 24, 1896.
- "Petition of Kindstedt & Kindberg Granted". The Providence Journal. May 19, 1899.
- "Miss Kindstedt, formerly of the Swedish Home". The Providence Journal. September 13, 1903.
- "Brayton Eulogized at Suffrage Hearing". The Providence Journal. March 3, 1910.
- "Should Demand Men's Wages". The Providence Journal. November 21, 1910.
- "Society Notes". The Providence Journal. June 9, 1912.
- "Suffragists Hold Debate". The Providence Journal. July 24, 1914.
- "Temperance Lodge Meets". The Providence Journal. August 12, 1914.
- "Equality League Women Discuss Marriage System; Gold Watch Presented to Miss Ingeborg Kindstedt". The Providence Journal. December 25, 1914.
- "Criticises House Attitude on Woman Suffrage Bill". The Providence Journal. March 26, 1915.
- "Miss Kindstedt Speaks Before Woman's League". The Providence Journal. April 16, 1915.
- "Governor Meets Suffrage Envoy". The Providence Journal. November 25, 1915.
- "Suffragists to Form Branch". The Providence Journal. December 23, 1915.
- "Speaks on Woman Suffrage". The Providence Journal. October 24, 1916.
- "Change in System Urged". The Providence Journal. February 20, 1917.
- "Ingeborg Kindstedt Speaks at Birthday Party at Chin Lee's". The Providence Journal. May 9, 1918.
- "[City Council proceedings]". The Providence News. Providence, R.I. September 17, 1897.
- "Salt Lake Women Welcome Suffrage Envoy" (PDF). Salt Lake Tribune. October 5, 1915 – via Better Days 2020, 1915 Suffrage Envoy, Utah Women's History.
- "Svenska tjenarinneehemmet". Scandinavia (in Swedish). July 17, 1895 – via Minnesota Historical Society Newspapers.
- "Svenskt Kafé". Scandinavia (in Swedish). September 15, 1897 – via Minnesota Historical Society Newspapers.
- "Stor efterfrågan på svenska flickor". Scandinavia (in Swedish). February 5, 1902 – via Minnesota Historical Society Newspapers.
- "Svenska barnmorskan miss Maria Kindberg". Scandinavia (in Swedish). September 24, 1902 – via Minnesota Historical Society Newspapers.
- "Mrs. E. Hincks". Scandinavia (in Swedish). September 19, 1906 – via Minnesota Historical Society Newspapers.
- "Energiska röstrattskvinnor". Skara Tidning (in Swedish). February 19, 1916.
- "Miss Lovisa Kindstedt". Svea (in Swedish). February 11, 1903 – via Minnesota Historical Society Newspapers.
- "Från Frankrike". Svea (in Swedish). December 4, 1918 – via Minnesota Historical Society Newspapers.
- "Hemkomna soldater". Svea (in Swedish). February 26, 1919 – via Minnesota Historical Society Newspapers.
- "Many Prominent Washington Women". The Washington Herald. March 2, 1917.
- "Två svensk-amerikanska rösträttsarbeterskor". Dagens Nyheter (in Swedish). February 12, 1916.
- "Kvinnans förnedring och upprättelse". Örebro-Kuriren (in Swedish). October 13, 1903 – via Kungliga biblioteket (tidningar.kb.se).
