= Darrell Scott (disambiguation) =

Darrell Scott is an American musician.

Darrell Scott may also refer to:

- Darrell Scott, founder of Rachel's Challenge
- Darrell Scott (American football) (born 1989), American football player
- Darryl Scott (cricketer) (born 1961), Australian cricketer
- Da'Rel Scott (born 1988), American football player
- Darryl Scott (born 1968), baseball pitcher
- Darrell C. Scott, American pastor and a member of President Donald Trump's executive transition team
- Darryl M. Scott, member of the Delaware House of Representatives
- Daryl Michael Scott, American historian and author
