= James A. Rawley Prize (OAH) =

The James A. Rawley Prize is given by the Organization of American Historians (OAH), for the best book on race relations in the United States. The prize is given in memory of James A. Rawley, Carl Adolph Happold Professor of History Emeritus at the University of Nebraska–Lincoln.

Year	Winner OAH Rawley Prize	Title of OAH Rawley Prize	Affiliation
1990	Kenneth L. Karst^{bio}	Belonging to America: Equal Citizenship and the Constitution (Yale University Press)	UCLA School of Law
1991	Douglas Monroy^{bio}	Thrown Among Strangers: The Making of Mexican Culture in Frontier California (University of California Press)	Colorado College
1992 co-winner	Richard White	The Middle Ground: Indians, Empires, and Republics in the Great Lakes Region, 1650–1815 (Cambridge University Press)	Stanford University
1992 co-winner	Ramón A. Gutiérrez	When Jesus Came, the Corn Mothers Went Away: Marriage, Sexuality, and Power in New Mexico, 1500–1846 (Stanford University Press)	University of California, San Diego
1993	Edward L. Ayers	The Promise of the New South: Life After Reconstruction (Oxford University Press)	University of Virginia
1994	Michael K. Honey^{bio}	Southern Labor and Black Civil Rights: Organizing Memphis Workers (University of Illinois Press)	
1995	Nancy MacLean^{bio}	Behind the Mask of Chivalry: The Making of the Second Ku Klux Klan (Oxford University Press)	Northwestern University
1996	Peter W. Bardaglio^{bio}	Reconstructing the Household: Families, Sex, and the Law in the Nineteenth Century South (University of North Carolina Press)	Goucher College
1997	Glenda Elizabeth Gilmore	Gender and Jim Crow: Women and the Politics of White Supremacy in North Carolina, 1896–1920 (University of North Carolina Press)	Yale University
1998	Daryl Michael Scott^{bio}	Contempt and Pity: Social Policy and the Image of the Damaged Black Psyche, 1880–1996 (University of North Carolina Press)	Columbia University
1999	Brian Ward^{bio}	Just My Soul Responding: Rhythm and Blues, Black Consciousness, and Race Relations (University of California Press)	University of Newcastle upon Tyne
2000	Timothy B. Tyson	Radio Free Dixie: Robert F. Williams and the Roots of Black Power (University of North Carolina Press)	University of Wisconsin–Madison
2001	Sherry L. Smith	Reimagining Indians: Native Americans through Anglo Eyes 1880–1940 (Oxford University Press)	Southern Methodist University
2002 co-winner	J. William Harris^{bio}	Deep Souths: Delta, Piedmont and Sea Island Society in the Age of Segregation (Johns Hopkins University Press)	University of New Hampshire
2002 co-winner	David W. Blight	Race and Reunion: The Civil War in American Memory (Harvard University Press)	Amherst College
2003 co-winner	Sharla M. Fett^{bio}	Working Cures: Healing, Health, and Power on Southern Slave Plantations (University of North Carolina Press)	Occidental College
2003 co-winner	Shane White^{bio}	Stories of Freedom in Black New York (University of North Carolina Press)	University of Sydney
2004	Barbara Ransby	Ella Baker and the Black Freedom Movement: A Radical Democratic Vision (University of North Carolina Press)	University of Illinois at Chicago
2005	Robert O. Self ^{bio}	American Babylon: Race and the Struggle for Postwar Oakland (Princeton University Press)	Brown University
2006	James Edward Smethurst^{bio}	The Black Arts Movement: Literary Nationalism in the 1960s and 1970s (University of North Carolina Press)	University of Massachusetts Amherst
2007	Paul A. Kramer^{bio}	The Blood of Government: Race, Empire, the United States, and the Philippines (University of North Carolina Press)	University of Michigan, Ann Arbor
2008	Susan Eva O'Donovan^{bio}	Becoming Free in the Cotton South (Harvard University Press)	Harvard University
2009	Vincent Brown	The Reaper's Garden: Death and Power in the World of Atlantic Slavery (Harvard University Press)	Harvard University
2010	Julie Greene	The Canal Builders: Making America's Empire at the Panama Canal (The Penguin Press)	University of Maryland, College Park
2011	Daniel Martinez HoSang	Racial Propositions: Ballot Initiatives and the Making of Postwar California (University of California Press)	University of Oregon
2012	Cindy Hahamovitch	No Man's Land: Jamaican Guestworkers in America and the Global History of Deportable Labor (Princeton University Press)	College of William & Mary
2013	Laura Briggs	Somebody's Children: The Politics of Transracial and Transnational Adoption (Duke University Press)	University of Massachusetts Amherst
2014	Brenda E. Stevenson	The Contested Murder of Latasha Harlins: Justice, Gender, and the Origins of the LA Riots (Oxford University Press)	University of California
2015	Daniel Berger	Captive Nation: Black Prison Organizing in the Civil Rights Era (The University of North Carolina Press)	University of Washington, Bothell
2016	Margaret Ellen Newell	Brethren By Nature: New England Indians, Colonists, and the Origins of American Slavery (Cornell University Press)	Ohio State University
2017	Robert G. Parkinson	The Common Cause: Creating Race and Nation in the American Revolution (The University of North Carolina Press)	Binghamton University
2018 co-winner	Kelly Lytle Hernández	City of Inmates: Conquest, Rebellion, and the Rise of Human Caging in Los Angeles, 1771–1965 (The University of North Carolina Press)	UCLA
2018 co-winner	Tiya Miles	The Dawn of Detroit: A Chronicle of Slavery and Freedom in the City of the Straits (The New Press)	University of Michigan
2019	Jeffrey C. Stewart	The New Negro: The Life of Alain Locke (Oxford University Press)	University of California, Santa Barbara
2020	Keeanga-Yamahtta Taylor	Race for Profit: How Banks and the Real Estate Industry Undermined Black Home Ownership (The University of North Carolina Press)	Princeton University
2021	Vincent Brown	Tacky’s Revolt: The Story of an Atlantic Slave War (Belknap Press of Harvard University Press)	Harvard University
2022	Destin Jenkins	The Bonds of Inequality: Debt and the Making of the American City (University of Chicago Press)	Stanford University
2023	Michael John Witgen	Seeing Red: Indigenous Land, American Expansion, and the Political Economy of Plunder in North America (Omohundro Institute of Early American History and Culture and University of North Carolina Press)	Columbia University
2024	Kevin Kenny	The Problem of Immigration in a Slaveholding Republic: Policing Mobility in the Nineteenth-Century United States (Oxford University Press)	New York University
2025	Sarah L. H. Gronningsater	The Rising Generation: Gradual Abolition, Black Legal Culture, and the Making of National Freedom (University of Pennsylvania Press)	University of Pennsylvania
2026	Emilie Connolly	Vested Interests: Trusteeship and Native Dispossession in the United States (Princeton University Press)	Brandeis University

== See also ==
- List of history awards
