= Maria Kindberg =

Swedish-American midwife, suffragist, and 1915 cross-country envoy driver

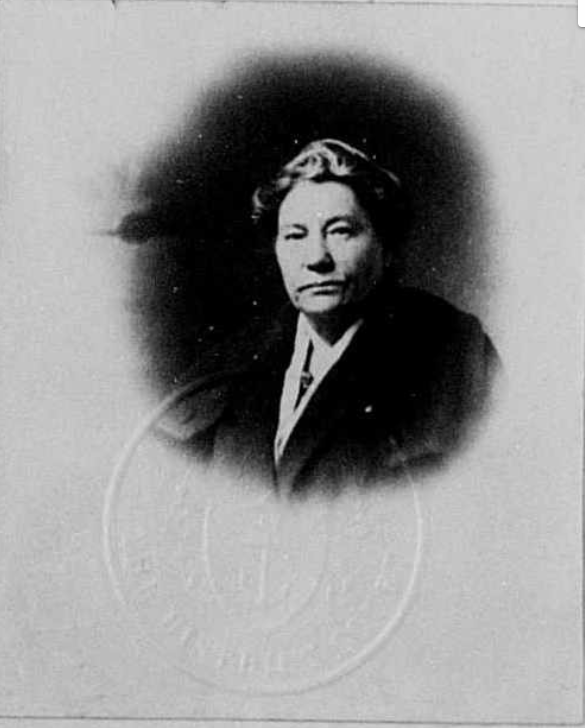
- Kindberg 1921
- Born: Maria Albertina Kindberg; October 7, 1860; Skövde rural parish, Skaraborg County, Sweden
- Died: June 7, 1921 (aged 60); Providence, Rhode Island, United States
- Resting place: Oakland Cemetery, Cranston, Rhode Island
- Occupations: Midwife, business owner
- Known for: Principal driver, 1915 cross-country suffrage envoy
- Movement: Women's suffrage
- Partner: Ingeborg Kindstedt
- Mother: Stina Cajsa Jansdotter Kindberg

Maria Albertina Kindberg (October 7, 1860 – June 7, 1921) was a Swedish-born American midwife and suffragist. She was one of the three women who drove the Congressional Union for Woman Suffrage's 1915 petition for a federal woman's suffrage amendment from San Francisco to Washington, D.C., serving as principal driver of the touring car for the ten-week cross-country journey.

== Early life in Sweden ==
Kindberg was born on October 7, 1860, at Ryds Fattighuset, the poorhouse in Skövde rural parish, Skaraborg County, Sweden. Her mother was Stina Cajsa Jonsdotter Kindberg (1817–1877), an unmarried maidservant.

Kindberg spent her childhood at the poorhouse with her older siblings, Augusta (1848–1938) and Carl Gustaf (1854–1934). Her mother remained there until her death in 1877, when Maria was sixteen years old.

After leaving the poorhouse, Kindberg worked as a maidservant at Kliened Vestergården, a farming estate in Frösve Parish, and was a servant on a farm in nearby Sventorp Parish, both in Skaraborg County.

Before emigrating, Kindberg trained as a midwife, passing her midwifery examination in Gothenburg.

== Life in Rhode Island ==
Kindberg emigrated from Sweden in 1884, sailing from Liverpool on June 7 aboard the SS Cephalonia of the Cunard Line and arriving at the port of Boston. In June 1895 she filed a declaration of intent to become a United States citizen in the U.S. District Court in Providence; she was naturalized in 1909.

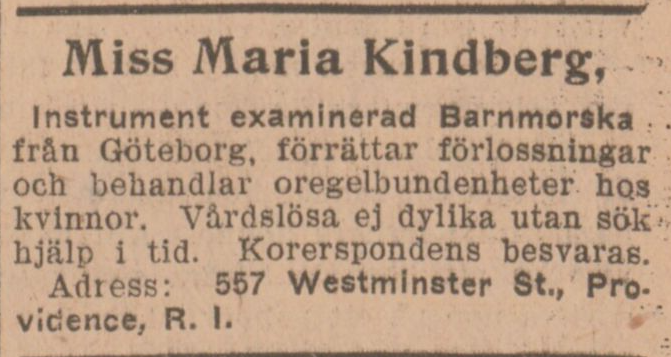
Ad for Maria Kindberg, instrument-certified midwife, 1906.

By 1895 she was living at 311 Blackstone Street in South Providence with fellow Swedish immigrant Ingeborg Kindstedt, in a neighborhood with a substantial Swedish community. That year she began advertising her midwifery practice at the Blackstone Street address in the Swedish-American press. She was an instrument-certified midwife trained in Gothenburg who performed deliveries and treated gynaecological conditions. (Note: The credential "instrument examinerad barnmorska" (instrument-examined midwife) denoted a midwife who had completed a supplementary course in operative delivery — including the use of forceps — beyond the basic two-semester midwifery training and examination offered at Sweden's three midwifery schools, in Stockholm, Gothenburg, and Lund.) She maintained an active practice at a succession of Providence addresses over the following decade. (Note: Kindberg maintained an active midwifery practice across several Providence addresses during this period: 311 Blackstone Street (1895); 376 Weybosset Street, operating from their Swedish Café (1898); 557 Westminster Street (1902); 69 Elmwood Avenue (July 1903); 90 Cranston Street (December 1903); and 557 Westminster Street again (1906).)

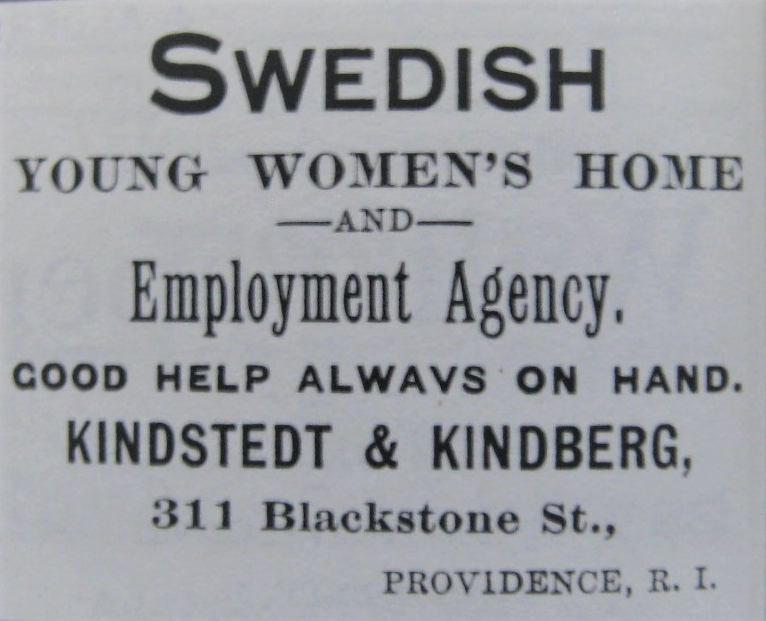
Ad for Swedish Young Women's Home and Employment Agency

In January 1896, Kindberg and Kindstedt, who jointly owned their South Providence residence, received a license from the Providence City Council to operate an employment agency. Known as the Swedish Young Women's Home and Employment Agency, the business served Providence's Swedish-American community.

In 1902 the two women relocated to an apartment at 557 Westminster Street in Providence's West End, near the Cathedral of Saints Peter and Paul, where Kindberg continued her practice.

The depth of their bond was evident in August 1905, when Kindstedt organized a surprise party for Kindberg at which friends presented her with $25 ($896 today) in gold; Kindberg, thanking attendees in a notice published in the Swedish-American newspaper Scandinavia, reserved her warmest thanks for Kindstedt. In 1912 they traveled to Norway together, sailing from New York aboard the Scandinavian America Line steamship SS Hellig Olav and spending the summer in Oslo.

Kindberg and Kindstedt were also active in the woman suffrage movement. By 1914 Kindberg served as secretary of the Rhode Island Woman's Political Equality League, while Kindstedt was its president; the organization held weekly meetings at their Westminster Street apartment. In December 1915 the League announced its intention to affiliate with the Congressional Union for Woman Suffrage (CU). Kindstedt served as secretary of the Rhode Island CU.

== 1915 cross-country suffrage envoy ==
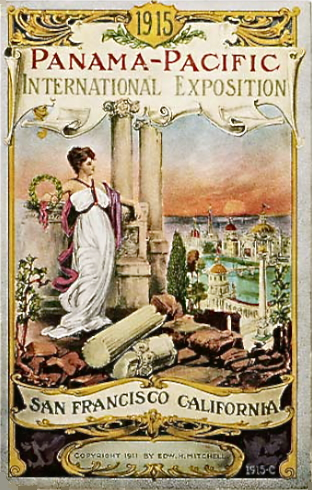
Poster for the Panama–Pacific International Exposition, held in San Francisco.

In 1915 Kindberg and Kindstedt traveled by steamship through the recently opened Panama Canal to the Panama–Pacific International Exposition in San Francisco, intending to purchase an automobile and drive home to Rhode Island. Learning of their plans, CU leader Alice Paul recruited them to instead transport the CU's 18,333-foot petition — bearing some 500,000 signatures for a federal woman's suffrage amendment — across the country to deliver to President Woodrow Wilson and the United States Congress.

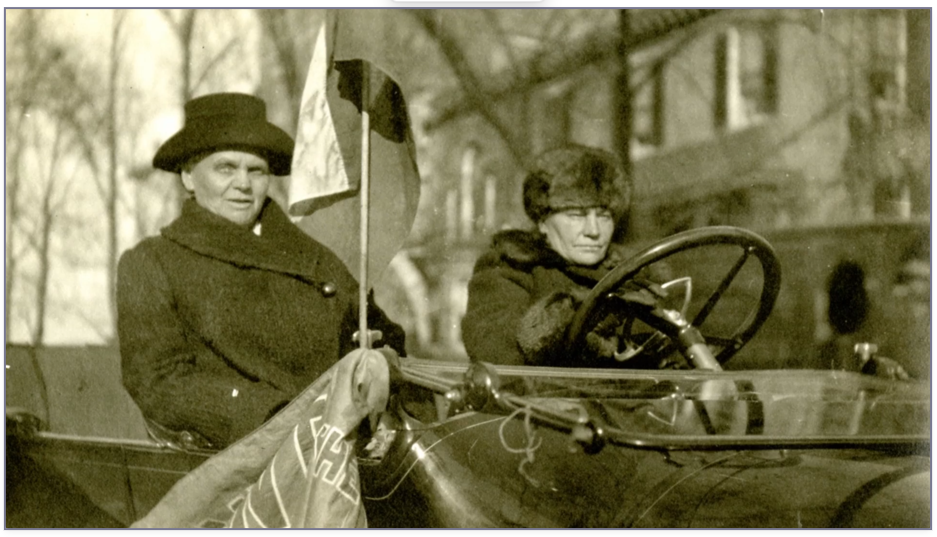
Kindstedt and Kindberg en route to Washington, D.C., 1915

For the journey, Kindberg purchased a brand-new Overland Six convertible touring car — soon nicknamed the "Suffrage Flier." The CU appointed Sara Bard Field and Frances Jolliffe as the envoy's official speakers; Jolliffe withdrew at Sacramento because of illness and rejoined the group in Albany, New York. Once the Suffrage Flier was on the road, Kindberg took the wheel as principal driver, Kindstedt served as on-the-road mechanic, and Field carried the speaking role.

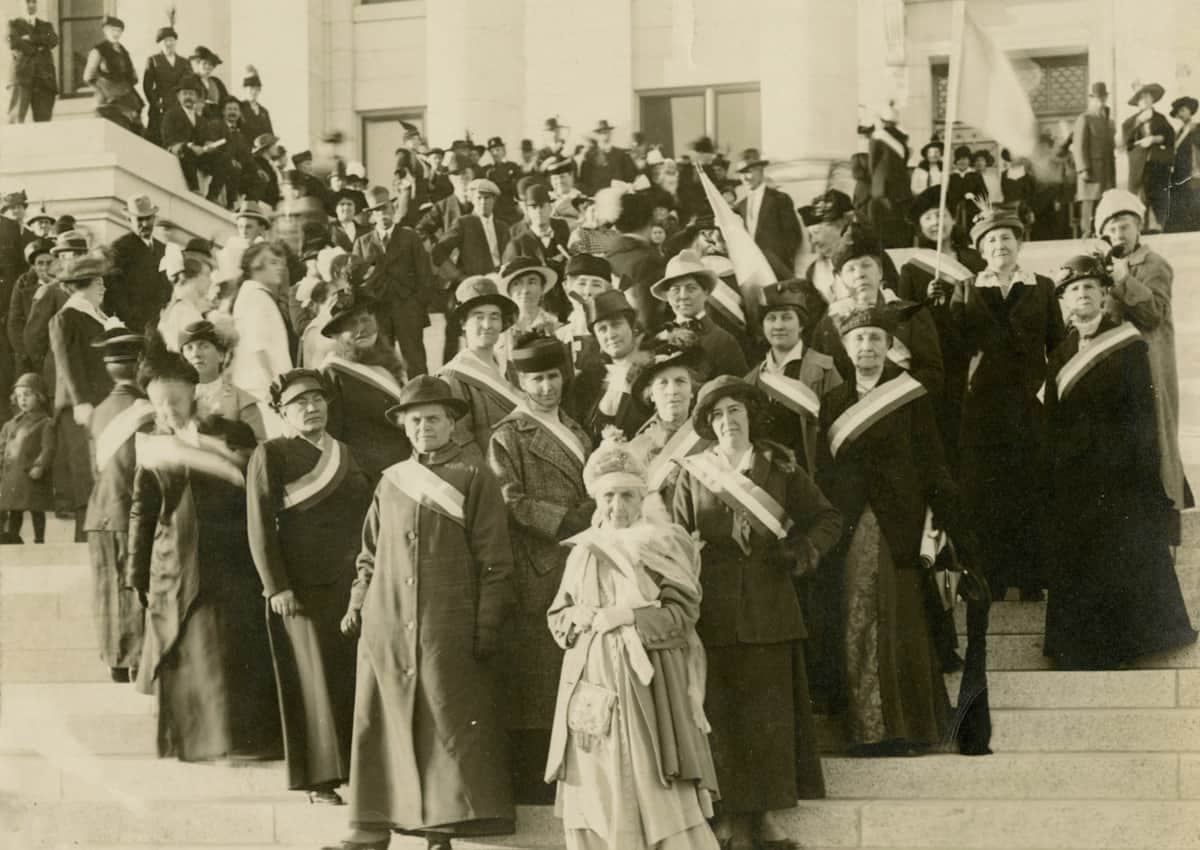
Woman suffrage envoys at the Utah State Capitol, October 16, 1915. Left to right: Maria A. Kindberg, Ingeborg Kindstedt, Emmeline B. Wells, and Sara Bard Field.

The envoy departed San Francisco in September 1915 beginning a roughly ten-week drive through eighteen states. With western roads still primitive — most just bumpy dirt tracks, with rare gravel stretches counted an improvement — the Suffrage Flier was fortunate to average twenty miles per hour. The car endured desert heat, mountain passes, snow, and repeated breakdowns: it broke an axle, suffered twelve flat tires, had to be pushed through drifts, and at one point in Kansas was stranded by a mud hole during a storm. Across the route Field delivered speeches and press interviews at some forty-eight cities.

En route to Washington, the envoys were received in Providence by Governor Robert Livingston Beeckman at the Rhode Island State House on November 24, 1915; by that point the Overland had covered 6,700 miles, and Kindberg and Kindstedt were hailed in the local press as "chauffeur and mechanician for the 'Suffrage Envoy Special' automobile."

The petition was delivered in Washington, D.C., on December 6, 1915, with the envoys and other suffragists presenting it to members of Congress and to President Wilson. President Wilson personally received and thanked Kindberg and Kindstedt, praising them by comparing them to John Ericsson, the Swedish-born engineer who designed the ironclad Monitor during the American Civil War, telling them: "I am proud of you, Swedish-American women, who have led the way with such a shining example." (Note: Wilson's words are preserved only in Swedish newspaper accounts and represent a translation and paraphrase of his spoken remarks rather than a verbatim record.)

== Death ==
In early 1921 Kindberg and Kindstedt planned a six-month visit to Sweden. However, on June 7, 1921, Kindberg died by suicide at their home in Providence, having inhaled illuminating gas. Kindstedt was named as informant on Kindberg's death certificate, where she was recorded as "Friend," and she served as executor of Kindberg's estate. In May 1922 a civil action captioned Carl G. Kindberg et al. v. Ingeborg Kindstedt, Exr. appeared on the Rhode Island Superior Court jury trial calendar, reflecting a dispute over the disposition of Kindberg's estate.

Kindberg was buried at Oakland Cemetery in Cranston, Rhode Island, near Roger Williams Park.

== Legacy ==
Kindberg's role as principal driver of the 1915 cross-country envoy has been highlighted in modern scholarship and public history. She and Kindstedt were jointly inducted into the Rhode Island Heritage Hall of Fame in 2020. Anne B. Gass's 2021 historical novel We Demand: The Suffrage Road Trip centers on Kindberg and Kindstedt as protagonists.

== Bibliography ==
=== Sources ===
- Cassidy, Tina (2020). Mr. President, How Long Must We Wait?: Alice Paul, Woodrow Wilson, and the Fight for the Right to Vote. S&S/37 Ink. ISBN 978-1-5011-7777-4.
- DeSimone, Russell (2020). "Rhode Island's Two Unheralded Suffragists". Online Review of Rhode Island History (Small State Big History).
- DeSimone, Russell; Miller, Elisa (2015). "Biographical Sketch of Maria Kindberg, 1860–1921". Women and Social Movements in the United States, 1600–2000. Alexander Street Press.
- "Maria Albertina Kindberg, U.S. naturalization record, U.S. Circuit Court for the District of Rhode Island, 11 August 1909 (including witness affidavit signed by Maria Ingeborg Kindstedt and Joachim F. Hartmann)". FamilySearch. 1909.
- "Maria Albertina Kindberg, U.S. passport application, 1921 (certificate 9322)". FamilySearch. 1921.
- Fry, Amelia (January 1969). "Along the Suffrage Trail: From West to East for Freedom Now!" (PDF). The American West. 6 (1). Western History Association: 16–25.
- Gass, Anne B. (2021). "'The Suffrage Road Trip': A Tribute to Two Middle-Aged, Lesbian, Immigrant Suffragists". Ms. Magazine.
- Gillmore, Inez Haynes (1921). The Story of the Woman's Party. New York: Harcourt, Brace.
- "Return of a Death: Maria Albertina Kindberg, 7 June 1921". City of Providence, Rhode Island. 1921.
- "Sara Bard Field, 1883–1974". National Portrait Gallery. Smithsonian Institution.
- "Suffrage Envoy Sara Bard Field". National Park Service.
- The Providence Directory. Providence, R.I.: Sampson, Murdock & Co. 1912. p. 407.
- City of Providence Tax Book. City of Providence, Rhode Island. 1922. p. 195.
- "Maria Kindberg (1860–1921) and Ingeborg Kindstedt (1865–1950)". Rhode Island Heritage Hall of Fame. 2020.
- "Maria Kindberg, 1915 Rhode Island state census, Providence Ward 04". FamilySearch. 1915.
- "Jury Trial Calendar: Carl G. Kindberg et al. vs Ingeborg Kindstedt, Exr". Rhode Island Law Record: 388. 18 May 1922.
- "Maria Albertina (with mother Stina Jonsdotter Kindberg and siblings Augusta and Carl Gustaf), Ryd Fattighuset household examination book, 1863–1888". FamilySearch (in Swedish). indexed from Riksarkivet. 1863–1888.
- "Kindberg, Maria, 1880 Swedish census (Folkräkning), Frösve parish". Folkräkningar (Sveriges befolkning) (in Swedish). Riksarkivet. 1880.
- Sigerman, Harriet (2012). "Road Trip for Suffrage" (PDF). Teaching Tolerance / Learning for Justice.
- "Maria Albertina, oäkta birth record, Skövde landsförsamling (rural parish of Skövde), 7 October 1860". Skövde landsförsamlings kyrkoarkiv (in Swedish). Riksarkivet.
- Smith, Sherry L. (2020). Bohemians West: Free Love, Family, and Radicals in Twentieth-Century America. Berkeley: Heyday Books. ISBN 978-1-59714-516-9.
- Smith, Sherry L. (2021). "Sara Bard Field and the Western Push for the Nineteenth Amendment". Montana: The Magazine of Western History. 71 (2). Montana Historical Society: 46–62. JSTOR 27107750.
- "Traveling for Suffrage Part 1: Two women, a cat, a car, and a mission". National Museum of American History. Smithsonian Institution.
- "Maria Albertina Kindberg, Frösve parish household examination book, 1873–1880". FamilySearch (in Swedish). indexed from Riksarkivet. 1873–1880.
- "Maria Albertina Kindberg, Frösve parish household examination book, 1880–1892". FamilySearch (in Swedish). indexed from Riksarkivet. 1880–1892.
- "Maria Albertina Kindberg, Sventorp parish household examination book, 1874–1892". FamilySearch (in Swedish). indexed from Riksarkivet. 1874–1892.
- Wayne, Tiffany (2022). "The Jewel City: Suffrage at the 1915 San Francisco Panama-Pacific International Exposition". Bunk History.

=== Newspaper articles ===
- "Petitions Granted". The Providence Journal. January 17, 1896.
- "Providence Tax List". The Providence Journal. June 1, 1896.
- "Judgment by Default". The Providence Journal. October 24, 1896.
- "Petition of Kindstedt & Kindberg Granted". The Providence Journal. May 19, 1899.
- "Society Notes". The Providence Journal. June 9, 1912.
- "Suffragists Hold Debate". The Providence Journal. July 24, 1914.
- "Governor Meets Suffrage Envoy". The Providence Journal. November 25, 1915.
- "Suffragists to Form Branch". The Providence Journal. December 23, 1915.
- "Två svensk-amerikanska rösträttsarbeterskor". Dagens Nyheter (in Swedish). February 12, 1916.
- "Energiska röstrattskvinnor". Göteborgs Handels- och Sjöfartstidning (in Swedish). February 11, 1916.
- "Energiska röstrattskvinnor". Skara Tidning (in Swedish). February 19, 1916.
- "Att gammal vänskap aldrig rostar". Scandinavia (in Swedish). August 30, 1905 – via Minnesota Historical Society Newspapers.
- "Miss Maria Kindberg". Scandinavia (in Swedish). December 5, 1906 – via Minnesota Historical Society Newspapers.
- "Svenska barnmorskan miss Maria Kindberg". Scandinavia (in Swedish). September 24, 1902 – via Minnesota Historical Society Newspapers.
- "Miss Maria Kindberg". Scandinavia (in Swedish). January 5, 1898 – via Minnesota Historical Society Newspapers.
- "Miss Maria Kindberg". Scandinavia (in Swedish). July 1, 1903 – via Minnesota Historical Society Newspapers.
- "Miss Maria Kindberg". Scandinavia (in Swedish). December 9, 1903 – via Minnesota Historical Society Newspapers.
- "Maria Kindberg". Scandinavia (in Swedish). September 4, 1895 – via Minnesota Historical Society Newspapers.
