= Sara Bard Field =

American poet and suffragist (1882–1974)

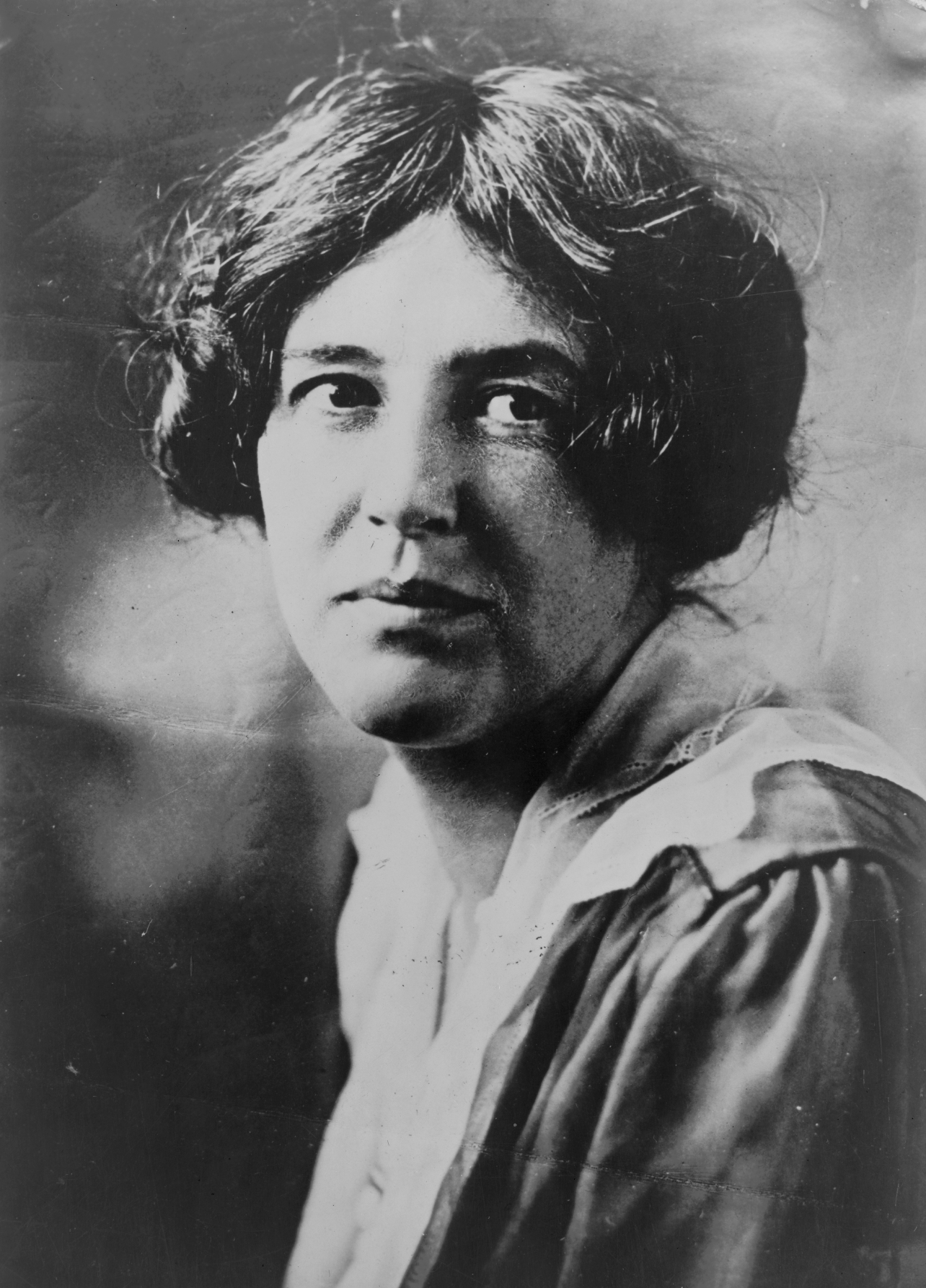
- Field, around 1915
- Born: September 1, 1882; Cincinnati, Ohio, US
- Died: June 15, 1974 (aged 91); Berkeley, California, US
- Other name: Sara Ehrgott
- Occupations: Poet; Suffragist
- Spouse(s): Albert Ehrgott (c. 1900–1914); Charles Erskine Scott Wood (1938–1944)

Sara Bard Field (September 1, 1882 – June 15, 1974) was an American poet, suffragist, free love advocate, Georgist, and Christian socialist. She worked on successful campaigns for women's suffrage in Oregon and Nevada. Working with Alice Paul and the National Woman's Party at the 1915 Panama-Pacific International Exposition in San Francisco, Field drove across the country from California to Washington, D.C., to present a petition containing a reported 500,000 signatures demanding a federal suffrage amendment to President Woodrow Wilson. She was known as a skilled orator and became a poet later in her career, marrying her long-time partner and mentor, poet and lawyer C.E.S. Wood.

== Early life and marriage ==
Sara Bard Field was born in Cincinnati, Ohio, on September 1, 1882, to Annie Jenkins (née Stevens) and George Bard Field. Her mother had a Quaker background and her father was a strict Baptist. Their family moved to Detroit, Michigan, in 1885. Sara graduated from Detroit Central High School in 1900. She married minister Albert Ehrgott, a man twice her age, in September 1900. She traveled with Ehrgott through India to Rangoon, Burma. She gave birth to a son, Albert Field, in 1901 and sustained injuries from childbirth. She returned to the United States in 1902 and the family settled in New Haven, Connecticut.

Ehrgott relocated to a parish in Cleveland, Ohio, in 1903. The pair were influenced by the Christian socialism and Georgism movements. Sara started a kindergarten and soup kitchen there and came to the attention of Progressive Cleveland mayor Tom L. Johnson. Her sister, Mary Field, introduced her to lawyer Clarence Darrow. Sara gave birth to a daughter, Katherine Louise, in 1906. Field's son died in an automobile accident while she was driving in October 1918. She suffered a breakdown from which she never completely recovered.

== Western Suffrage Activism ==
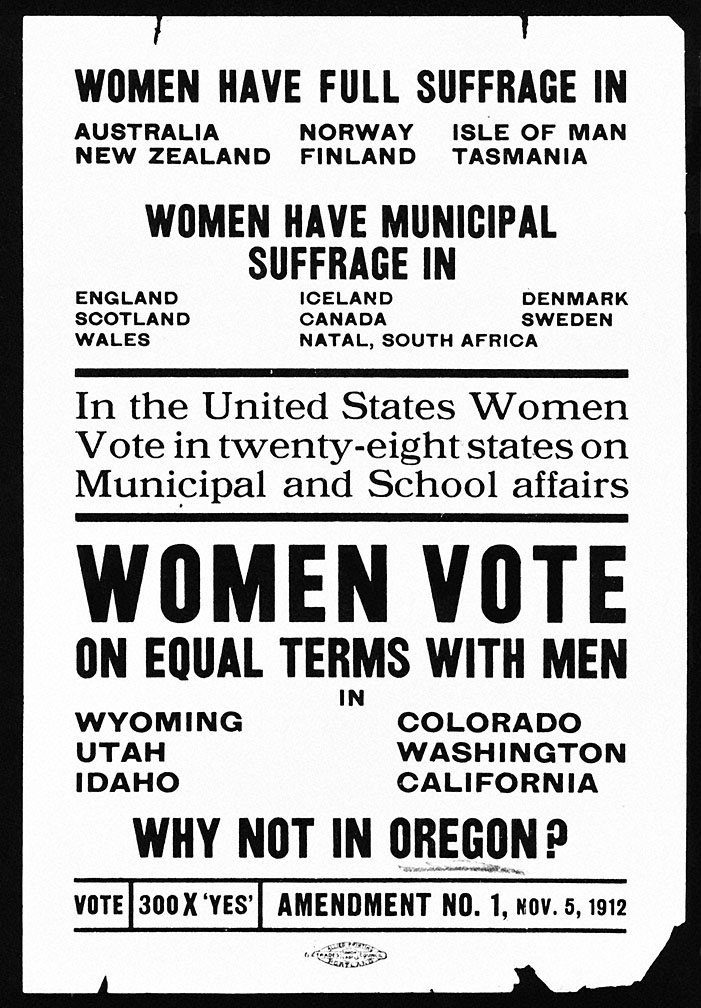
Women's Suffrage Handbill Oregon 1912

Following the birth of their daughter, the Ehrgotts moved to Portland, Oregon, in 1910. Sara was introduced to C.E.S. Wood by Clarence Darrow. The two became friends and she was hired to be Wood's assistant, offering critiques of his work. Their friendship grew into a love affair. She joined the Oregon College Equal Suffrage League and continued the work of Abigail Scott Duniway, campaigning for suffrage throughout Oregon. She toured the state giving speeches during the summer of 1911 and that fall she worked as a reporter for the Oregon Daily Journal, covering the trial of the McNamara brothers, who had bombed the Los Angeles Times building. She toured Oregon again during the summer of 1912 and her marriage began to crumble.

During 1913–1914, she established residency in Nevada in order to pursue a divorce and used her time there to campaign for women's suffrage in Nevada. Over the objection of her husband, she was granted a divorce in November 1914, reverting to her maiden name. Ehrgott was awarded custody of their children and moved to Berkeley, California. Field moved to San Francisco to be close to her son and daughter.

Field became involved in the national movement for women's suffrage and became a member of the National American Woman Suffrage Association's Congressional Union and later the National Woman's Party. Field participated in suffrage activities at the 1915 Panama-Pacific International Exposition (or World's Fair) in San Francisco, where suffragist leader Alice Paul selected Field and California suffragist Frances Jolliffe to drive across the country to hand-deliver to President Woodrow Wilson a petition of signatures gathered demanding a federal suffrage amendment to the U.S. Constitution. Field, Jolliffe, and two Swedish women (Ingeborg Kinstedt and Maria Kindberg) left San Francisco on September 16, 1915, in a celebratory kick-off event at the Panama-Pacific International Expo. Jolliffe left the car in Nevada, because of illness, but rejoined the group on the East Coast. Suffragist and Congressional Union (CU) organizer Mabel Vernon traveled by train ahead of the envoys and organized parades, receptions, and meetings with local politicians, all in an effort to garner publicity for the road trip and the suffrage cause. The trip was reported in the CU's weekly journal, The Suffragist, as well as in local and national newspapers. The suffrage envoys completed their journey on December 6, 1915, and presented the petition to President Woodrow Wilson in Washington, D.C.

Field spoke at the Chicago convention of the National Woman's Party in 1916, and on behalf of Anne Henrietta Martin during Martin's bid for the U.S. Senate from Nevada. Field also suggested the suffragist slogan "No votes, no babies!" In the summer of 1917, Field stayed in Newport, Rhode Island, where she helped millionaire socialite Alva Belmont write her memoirs. In February 1921, Field represented the NWP in presenting a women's rights statue to the U.S. Congress, a statue currently on display in the Capitol Rotunda.

== Later life and poetry ==
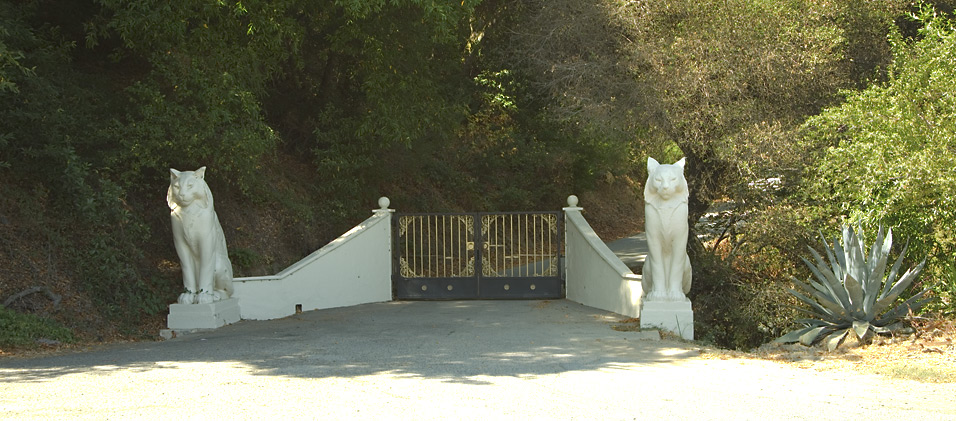
Entrance to "The Cats" in Los Gatos

Field began living with lawyer and poet Charles Erskine Scott Wood in San Francisco after 1918. His wife refused to grant him a divorce. Field focused on her poetry and the couple hosted local artists at their home such as Genevieve Taggard, Benny Bufano, Ralph Stackpole, Llewelyn Powys, and George Sterling. Wood was wealthy and the couple were patrons of the arts and supported political causes, including the pardon of Tom Mooney and a birth control clinic.

In 1923 Field moved with Wood to a 30-acre (12 ha) estate named "The Cats" in Los Gatos, California. The house was built in 1925 on a 34-acre property, with an entry way featuring a wrought iron gate flanked by two large white cat sculptures, named Leo and Leona. The sculptures were made by sculptor Robert Paine, and an image of them is featured on the seal of the town of Los Gatos.

Field's first collection of poetry, The Pale Woman, was published in 1927. She followed the collection with the epic poem Barabbas in 1932. Barabbas earned her a gold medal from the Book Club of California. Her second collection of poetry, Darkling Plain, was published in 1936.

Following the death of his wife, Wood married Field in 1938. Wood died in 1944 and in 1955, Field moved near her daughter in Berkeley. Field died from arteriosclerotic heart disease on June 15, 1974.

== Selected works ==
- Field, Sara Bard (1927). The Pale Woman: And other poems. New York: William Edwin Rudge. OCLC 3597110.
- ——— (1932). Barabbas. New York: A. & C. Boni, Inc. OCLC 2928485.
- ——— (1936). Darkling Plain. New York: Random House. ISBN 9781417987931. OCLC 2868011.

== See also ==
- List of suffragists and suffragettes
- Timeline of women's suffrage
