= Ramón A. Gutiérrez =

American historian

Ramón Arturo Gutiérrez (born c. 1951) is an American historian of race and ethnic relations. He studies "Mexican-American history, Indian-White relations in the Americas, social and economic history of the Southwest, colonial Latin American and Mexican immigration." He has authored or edited many books and journal articles on these subjects.

== Life ==
Gutiérrez graduated from the University of New Mexico with a bachelor's degree in Latin American history. He earned a master's degree (1975) and a PhD (1980) from the University of Wisconsin–Madison. In 1983, he was selected as a MacArthur Fellow by the MacArthur Fellows Program. He taught at the University of California, San Diego from 1982 to 2007. He also taught at the University of Chicago where he became the Preston & Sterling Morton Distinguished Service Professor Emeritus of History and the College

== Awards ==
- 1992 Allan Sharlin Memorial Book Award
- 1992 Frederick Jackson Turner Award from the American Historical Association
- 1992 James A. Rawley Prize from the Organization of American Historians
- 1983 MacArthur Fellows Program
- John Hope Franklin Prize from the American Studies Association

== Works ==
- "What's Love Got to Do with It?", Journal of American History, Vol.88, No.3, December 2001
- When Jesus Came the Corn Mothers Went Away: Marriage, Sexuality and Power in New Mexico, 1500-1846. Stanford: Stanford University Press. 1991. ISBN 978-0-8047-1832-5.
  - Cuando Jesús llegó, las madres del maíz se fueron: Matrimonio, sexualidad y poder en Nuevo México, 1500-1846 (México: Fondo de la Cultura Económica, 1993).
- Marriage, Sex and the Family: Social Change in Colonial New Mexico, 1690-1846. University of Wisconsin--Madison Ph.D. thesis. 1980.

=== Edited ===
- Ramón A. Gutiérrez; Patricia Zavella, eds. (2009). Mexicans in California: Emergent Challenges and Transformations. University of Illinois Press. ISBN 978-0-252-07607-7.
- Contested Eden: California before the Gold Rush. Berkeley: University of California Press. 1998. ISBN 978-0-520-21274-9.
- Ramón A. Gutiérrez (1997). Dana Salvo; William H. Beezley (eds.). Home Altars of Mexico. Photographer Sal Scalora, Dana Salvo. University of New Mexico Press. ISBN 978-0-8263-1785-8.
- Ramón A. Gutiérrez; Geneviève Fabre, eds. (1995) Festivals and Celebrations in American Ethnic Communities. Albuquerque: University of New Mexico Press.
- Ramón A. Gutiérrez; Genaro M. Padilla, eds. (1993). Recovering the U.S. Hispanic Literary Heritage. Houston: Arte Público Press. ISBN 978-1-55885-361-4.
- Ramón A. Gutiérrez; Ernest Cook, eds. (1993). Encyclopedia of the North American Colonies. New York: Charles Scribner's Sons.

=== Co-authored ===
- Co-author, The Drama of Diversity and Democracy: Higher Education and American Commitments (Washington, D.C.: Association of American Colleges and Universities, 1995).
- Co-author, American Pluralism and the College Curriculum: Higher Education in a Diverse Democracy (Washington, D.C.: Association of American Colleges and Universities, 1995).
- Co-author, Liberal Learning and the Arts of Connection for the New Academy (Washington, D.C.: Association of American Colleges and Universities, 1995).
