= Kelly Lytle Hernández =

American historian

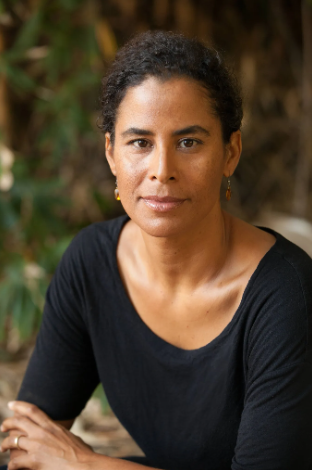
- Born: Kelly Lytle; March 3, 1974 (age 52); San Diego, California, U.S.
- Education: University of California, San Diego (BA); University of California, Los Angeles (PhD)
- Occupations: Professor of History, African American Studies, and Urban Planning
- Employer: University of California, Los Angeles
- Organization(s): Society of American Historians; American Academy of Arts and Sciences
- Board member of: Pulitzer Prize Board
- Awards: MacArthur Genius Grant (2019); American Book Award (2018); John Hope Franklin Publication Prize (2018); James A. Rawley Prize (2018); Robert G. Athearn Award (2018)

Kelly Lytle Hernández is an American academic and historian. Lytle Hernández is a tenured professor of History, African American Studies, and Urban Planning at the University of California, Los Angeles (UCLA) where she holds The Thomas E. Lifka Endowed Chair in History and is the director of the Ralph J. Bunche Center for African American Studies. In 2019 she received a MacArthur Fellowship, commonly but unofficially known as the "Genius Grant". She is an elected member of the Society of American Historians, the American Academy of Arts and Sciences, and the Pulitzer Prize Board. She has written four books on the history of race, immigration control, border enforcement, policing and incarceration. Since her MacArthur Grant she has been called a "rebel historian", a label she is proud and "honored" to own.

== Early life and education ==
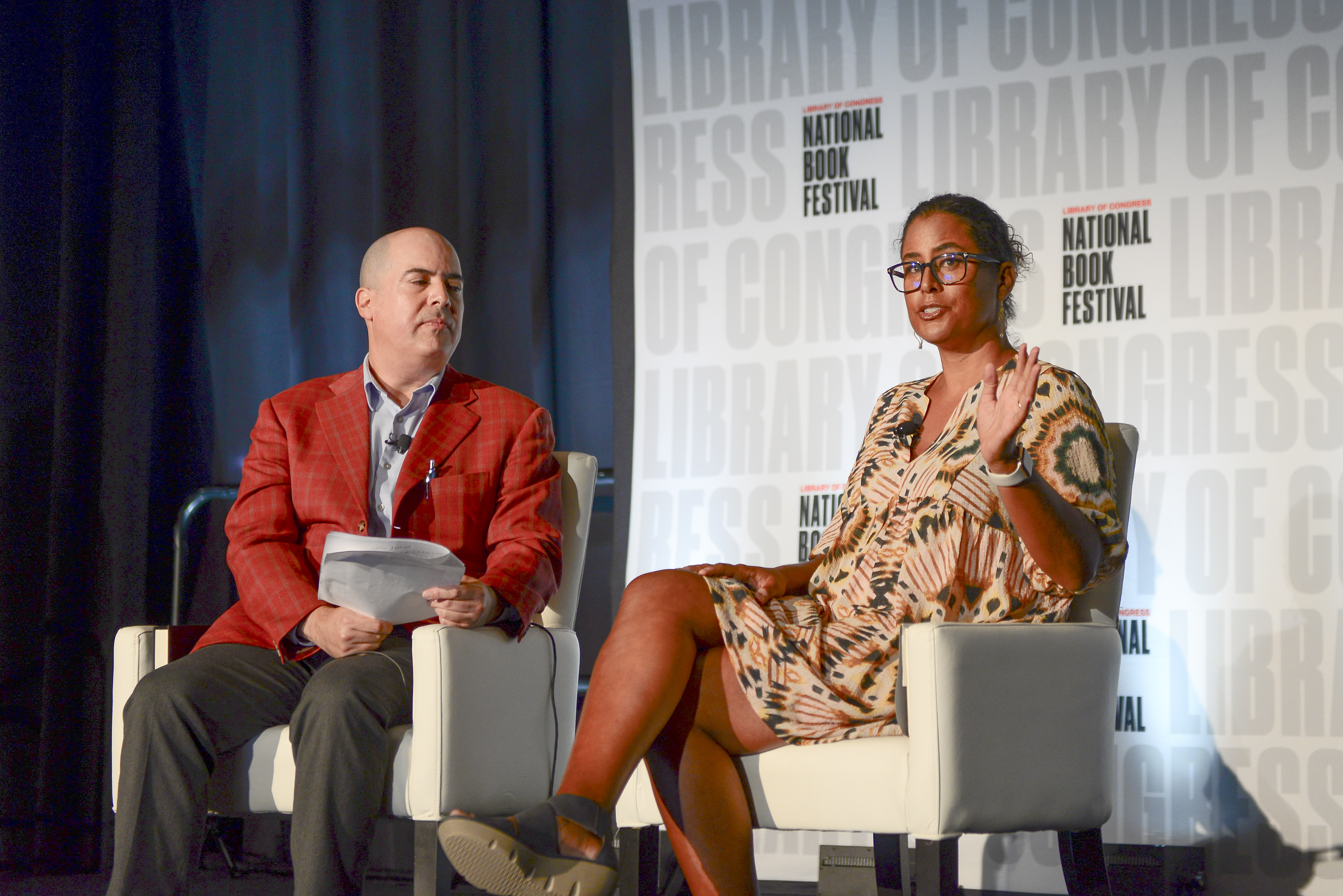
Hernández discusses her work at the National Book Festival in 2022

Lytle Hernández was born on March 3, 1974 to Cecil and Rebecca E. Lytle; she grew up in the Clairemont area of San Diego, California. Her father, Cecil Lytle, was a music professor and the provost of Thurgood Marshall College at the University of California, San Diego, where he taught for 34 years. Her mother, who worked as an art editor, died in 1994.

Lytle Hernández received a Bachelor of Arts in Ethnic Studies in 1996 from the University of California, San Diego. She then spent a year in South Africa working and teaching at a farm school before returning to school. In 2002, she received her PhD from the University of California, Los Angeles.

== Scholarship ==
Lytle Hernández has described seeing the U.S. Border Patrol track and monitor Latinos in her community and noticed that it was "hauntingly similar to what many of what us African American kids and teens were experiencing in terms of the rise of the war on drugs at the same time." She experienced her own "share of locker sweeps at school, and was registered as a 'gang member' by the local police."

Lytle Hernández even watched as a friend who was accused of dealing drugs was shot four times by the police. In the neighborhoods where she lived, armed border officers targeted Mexicans and "snatched them off buses, chased them across highways, and took my friend's uncle in the middle of the night." Observing these parallels between the war on drugs and the war on immigrants, she felt compelled "to go on and study these systems."

All of her books and scholarly articles are based on her research into the history of race, immigration control, border enforcement, policing and incarceration. She has written four books and numerous scholarly articles and is considered one of the nation’s leading experts on race, immigration and mass incarceration.

=== Migra! A History of the U.S. Border Patrol ===
Her first book, Migra! A History of the U.S. Border Patrol, was about Mexican immigration to the United States. The MacArthur Foundation has called it "the first significant academic history" of the Border Patrol. When asked why she wrote the book, Lytle Hernández referred back to her formative experiences in San Diego and said: "I just had this passion in my belly that was driving me to want to write this history of the border patrol.... I really wanted to understand why this was happening." She tells the story from the "discordant beginnings" of the organization in 1924 as an "inauspicious" outfit to its emergence as a large professional police force. According to the New York Journal of Books, she "chronicles a disturbing tale of the violent origins of the U.S. Border Patrol". Reviewers have called it "impressive and painstakingly researched", a "rich and detailed analysis", "well written and highly insightful," and praised its used of previously "untapped source materials". For this book, Lytle Hernández was awarded the Clements Prize from the William P. Clements Center for Southwest Studies in 2010, Honorable Mention for the John Hope Franklin Prize by the American Studies Association, and Honorable Mention for the Lora Romero First Book Publication Prize also from the American Studies Association.

=== City of Inmates: Conquest, Rebellion, and the Rise of Human Caging in Los Angeles ===
Her second book, City of Inmates: Conquest, Rebellion, and the Rise of Human Caging in Los Angeles is about the rise of mass incarceration in Los Angeles, which currently maintains the nation’s largest jail system and includes "federal and state prisons, local jails, immigrant detention centers, and youth 'camps'". The book's central argument is that "mass incarceration is mass elimination", which Lytle Hernández develops by examining the historical growth of the Los Angeles region from the first native people through the "Watts Rebellion" in 1965. She documents how "settlers persistently deployed incarceration as a means of purging, removing, caging, containing, erasing, disappearing, and otherwise eliminating indigenous communities and racially targeted populations". She traces how white settlers waged a war of elimination on indigenous people, and attempted to keep African Americans, Chinese and Mexican people from settling. While writing the book she had to overcome the fact that police and other public officials had destroyed the overwhelming majority of the historical records. To overcome this problem she had to rely on what she calls the "rebel archive", the records of the resistance and rebellion of those "who fought the rise of jails and prisons and detentions centers." Reviewers have called the book "extraordinary—bracing, brave, and profoundly important"; "superb"; an "incisive and meticulously researched study of the transformation of Los Angeles from a small group of Native American communities in the 18th century into an 'Aryan city of the sun' in the 20th"; "phenomenal...path-breaking" and "insightful". Others have noted the book's "radically new perspective" and praised the fact that it "demonstrates incontrovertibly that the systems of immigrant exclusion and mass incarceration emerged together and fed each other." In 2018 it won the American Book Award from the Before Columbus Foundation, the John Hope Franklin Publication Prize from the American Studies Association, the James A. Rawley Prize from the Organization of American Historians, and the Robert G. Athearn Award from the Western History Association.

=== Bad Mexicans: Race, Empire, and Revolution in the Borderlands ===
Her third book, Bad Mexicans: Race, Empire, and Revolution in the Borderlands, was published in May 2022. The book examines the history of the magonistas, the migrant rebels who initiated the Mexican Revolution (1910–1917) from the United States. The leader of the magonistas was the eponymous Ricardo Flores Magón, who Lytle Hernández argues "actually catalyzed the Mexican Revolution, largely from exile in the U.S." This revolution is often viewed from its impact on Mexico and Central America, but "the author argues convincingly that it 'also remade the United States.'" She describes an American government just as hostile to the revolutionaries as was the Mexican government. U.S. companies and wealthy Americans had extensive financial interests and land ownership in Mexico — land that Lytle Hernández describes as stolen from poor "miners, farmworkers and cotton pickers." U.S. agents and police provided extensive help to the Mexican government by spying on, harassing and jailing the revolutionaries and their supporters.

The book has been described by reviewers as a "beautifully crafted, impressively inclusive history of the Mexican Revolution", "a brilliant, impeccably-researched, and engaging history of the lead up to the Mexican Revolution", "an incredible new book", and "history at its most elucidating". The Houston Press humorously captured their take by titling their review "'Bad Mexicans' with Good Intentions."

A reviewer from the Los Angeles Times observes that the book's "central premise" is "the idea that Mexican and U.S. histories aren’t isolated from each other but are so intertwined that you can’t separate them." Hernández agreed, saying she was "taking everything and pivoting and positioning it within the context of U.S. history." In an interview with Publishers Weekly she spoke to her motivation, "it was when Donald Trump used the phrase 'bad hombres,' that I knew that this story needed to be told". She continued, "Imperialists and white supremacists have used this kind of language to stir up anti-Mexican, anti-Latino, and anti-immigrant sentiment.... when you start to hear that racist rhetoric, dig a little deeper to ask what's it all about?"

=== Racist by Design: Two Centuries of U.S. Immigration Control ===
Her forth book, Racist by Design: Two Centuries of U.S. Immigration Control, was published in September 2026. It reveals how generations of politicians, lawmakers and law enforcers built the American immigration system to encourage white immigrants while excluding and segregating nonwhite migrants. "The goal, often explicitly stated by the system’s architects, was to create a permanent caste of undocumented and criminalized workers to provide cheap labor for the U.S. economy." She describes the development of the American immigration system from its origins to it current operation today. "Most accounts begin with the Chinese Exclusion Act of the late nineteenth century. Lytle Hernández starts a full century earlier, with the Haitian Revolution of the 1790s, which prompted both the country’s first immigration bans and its first refugee resettlement program."

== Million Dollar Hoods ==
Lytle Hernández is also the Founding Director and Special Advisor to the Million Dollar Hoods project, which she co-founded in 2016. The project uses Los Angeles Police Department data to determine the fiscal and human cost of policing and mass incarceration in Los Angeles. Almost immediately the project "identified 31 neighborhoods in which the Los Angeles Sheriff’s Department had spent at least $6 million incarcerating residents between 2010 and 2015." This revealed how certain neighborhoods, primarily Black and Latino communities, were disproportionately impacted by the Los Angeles jail, policing and bail systems; and that the "county’s budget is inordinately used to incarcerate residents of a few neighborhoods". The Los Angeles Times classified the project as "Archiving the Age of Mass Incarceration." One of its major achievements was fighting for and winning in court access to 177 boxes of historical records from the Los Angeles Police Department. Lytle Hernández described this as "an example of community control over policing." The project's website posts research reports which summarize trends in local policing and incarceration, "including the disproportionate effects of bail on predominantly African American and Latina/Latino communities." Beyond the academic investigation and reporting, the project strives to make changes to the systems they investigate. "Million Dollar Hoods has supported efforts to shift public funding away from police and jails, toward systems that are proven to create thriving families and communities, such as housing, education and health services." Lytle Hernández has testified before the State legislature and she can be found "at city hall with her students" advocating for change.

== Bibliography ==
=== Selected publications ===
- Mexican Immigration to the United States, 1900 – 1999: A Sourcebook for Teachers, National Center for History in the Schools (Fall 2002)
- Ni blancos ni negros: mexicanos y el papel de la patrulla fronteriza estadounidense en la definición de una nueva categoría racial, 1924-1940, Cuicuilco v 11, n 31 (Mayo-Agosto 2004): 85-104
- The Crimes and Consequences of Illegal Immigration: A Cross-Border Examination of Operation Wetback, 1943-1954, Western Historical Quarterly (Winter 2006), 421-444
- An Introduction to el Archivo Histórico del Instituto Nacional de Migración, co-authored with Pablo Yankelevich, Aztlán: A Journal of Chicano Studies v 34, n 1 (Spring 2009), 157-168
- Persecuted Like Criminals: The Politics of Labor Emigration and Mexican Migration Controls in the 1920s and 1930s, Aztlán: A Journal of Chicano Studies v 34, n 1 (Spring 2009), 219-239
- Mexican Immigration to the United States, Magazine of History, Organization of American Historians, v 23 n 4 (October 2009)
- Borderlands and the Future History of the American West, Western Historical Quarterly, v 42 n 3 (Autumn 2011)
- Amnesty or Abolition?: Felons, Illegals, and the Case for a New Abolition Movement, Boom: A Journal of California (Winter 2011). Link: Amnesty or Abolition?
- Hobos in Heaven: Race, Incarceration, and the Rise of Los Angeles, 1880 - 1910, Pacific Historical Review v 83, n 3 (August 2014)
- Introduction: Constructing the Carceral State, co-authored with Khalil Gibran Muhammad and Heather Ann Thompson, The Journal of American History v 102, n 1 (June 2015)
- Introduction: The Carceral West, Pacific Historical Review v 88 n 1
- "How crossing the US-Mexico border became a crime". theconversation.com. The Conversation. Apr 30, 2017.
- Migra! : a history of the U.S. Border Patrol University of California Press, Berkeley, Calif., 2010. ISBN 9780520257696
- City of inmates : conquest, rebellion, and the rise of human caging in Los Angeles, 1771-1965 The University of North Carolina Press, Chapel Hill, 2017. ISBN 9781469631189
- Bad Mexicans : race, empire, and revolution in the borderlands W.W. Norton & Company, New York, NY, 2022. ISBN 9781324004370
- Racist by Design: Two Centuries of U.S. Immigration Control W. W. Norton & Company, New York, NY, 2026. ISBN 9781324117094
