= Margaret Ellen Newell =

American historian

- Awards: James A. Rawley Prize

Academic background
- Education: BA, history and Spanish, 1984, Brown University; MA, PhD, Early American History, University of Virginia
- Thesis: Economic ideology, culture and development in New England, 1620-1800 (1991)

Academic work
- Institutions: Ohio State University

Margaret Ellen Newell is an American historian. She is a Full professor of history at Ohio State University and recipient of the 2016 James A. Rawley Prize from the Organization of American Historians.

== Early life and education ==
Newell earned her Bachelor of Arts degree from Brown University and her Master's degree and PhD from the University of Virginia.

== Career ==
Upon earning her PhD, Newell joined the faculty at Ohio State University (OSU) in 1991. During her early tenure at the university, she published her first book; From Dependency to Independence: Economic Revolution in Colonial New England. The book focused on how early New England colonialists grew their struggling economy in limited time to successfully lead an Independence war. Following the publication of this book, she received the school's Outstanding Faculty Member by the Sphinx and Mortar Board Senior Class Honoraries.

In 2015, Newell was promoted to the rank of Full professor in the Department of History at OSU. In this role, she published her second book titled Brethren by Nature: New England Indians, Colonists, and the Origins of American Slavery, which received the James A. Rawley Prize and the Peter J. Gomes Memorial Book Prize. The book discussed how New England colonists enslaved thousands of Native Americans and were the first colony to legalize slavery. In 2019, she was the recipient of OSU's Harlan Hatcher Arts and Sciences Distinguished Faculty Award.

== Publications ==
- Robert Child and the entrepreneurial vision: economic development and ideology in New England, 1629-1654, 1986
- Economic ideology, culture and development in New England, 1620-1800, 1991
- From dependency to independence: economic revolution in colonial New England, 1997
- Brethren by nature: New England Indians, colonists, and the origins of American slavery, 2015
