= Vincent Brown (historian) =

American professor

- Known for: Author, documentary filmmaker, essayist, literary critic, professor
- Awards: 2008-09 Louis Gottschalk Prize; 2021 Frederick Douglass Book Prize; 2021 James A. Rawley Prize

Academic background
- Education: University of California, San Diego (BA); Duke University (PhD)

Academic work
- Discipline: History
- Institutions: Yale University

Vincent Brown is the David Brion Davis Professor of History at Yale University. He was previously the Charles Warren Professor of History, Professor of African and African-American Studies, and Director of the History Design Studio at Harvard University. His research, writing, teaching, and other creative endeavors are focused on the political dimensions of cultural practice in the African diaspora, with a particular emphasis on the early modern Atlantic world.

== Life ==
A native of Southern California, Brown was educated at the University of California, San Diego, and received his Ph.D. in history from Duke University, where he also trained in the theory and craft of film and video making. He is the author of articles and reviews in scholarly journals, is principal investigator and curator for the animated thematic map Slave Revolt in Jamaica, 1760–1761: A Cartographic Narrative (2013), and was producer and director of research for the television documentary Herskovits at the Heart of Blackness (2009). The film was a recipient of the 2009 John E. O'Connor Film Award of the American Historical Association and was awarded best documentary at both the 2009 Hollywood Black Film Festival and the 2009 Martha's Vineyard African-American Film Festival. It was broadcast on season 11 of the PBS series Independent Lens. His first book, The Reaper's Garden: Death and Power in the World of Atlantic Slavery (2008), was co-winner of the 2009 Merle Curti Award and received the 2009 James A. Rawley Prize and the 2008–09 Gottschalk Prize. Brown appeared in the 2013 PBS documentary series The African Americans: Many Rivers to Cross, and also in the 2025 PBS documentary series The American Revolution.

== Awards ==
- 2008–09: Gottschalk Prize for The Reaper’s Garden: Death and Power in the World of Atlantic Slavery
- 2009: James A. Rawley Prize (OAH) for The Reaper’s Garden: Death and Power in the World of Atlantic Slavery
- 2009: Merle Curti Award for The Reaper's Garden: Death and Power in the World of Atlantic Slavery
- 2011: Guggenheim Fellowship
- 2020: Cundill History Prize finalist for Tacky's Revolt
- 2021: Anisfield-Wolf Book Award for non-fiction for Tacky's Revolt
- 2021: James A. Rawley Prize (OAH) for Tacky's Revolt
- 2021: Frederick Douglass Book Prize for Tacky's Revolt

== Selected works ==
- "Blackness in Diaspora," in Plantation Society in the Americas, Vol. VI, Nos 2&3 (Fall 1999): 305–312.
- Brown, Vincent (April 2003). "Spiritual Terror and Sacred Authority in Jamaican Slave Society". Slavery & Abolition. 24 (1): 24–53. doi:10.1080/714005263. S2CID 144362132.
- Brown, Vincent (April 2008). "Eating the Dead: Consumption and Regeneration in the History of Sugar". Food and Foodways: History and Culture of Human Nourishment. 16 (2): 117–126. doi:10.1080/07409710802085973. S2CID 144753714.
- The Reaper's Garden: Death and Power in the World of Atlantic Slavery. Cambridge, Massachusetts: Harvard University Press. 2008. ISBN 978-0-674-02422-9.
- Herskovits at the Heart of Blackness. Vital Pictures.
- Brown, V. (December 2009). "Social Death and Political Life in the History of Atlantic Slavery: Between Resistance and Oblivion". American Historical Review. 114 (5): 1231–1249. doi:10.1086/ahr.114.5.1231. PMID 20217990.
- "Slave Revolt in Jamaica, 1760–1761: A Cartographic Narrative". AxisMaps.
- Tacky's Revolt: The Story of an Atlantic Slave War. Cambridge, Massachusetts: Harvard University Press. 2020. ISBN 978-0-674-73757-0.
