= Frances Jolliffe =

American actress, journalist and suffragist

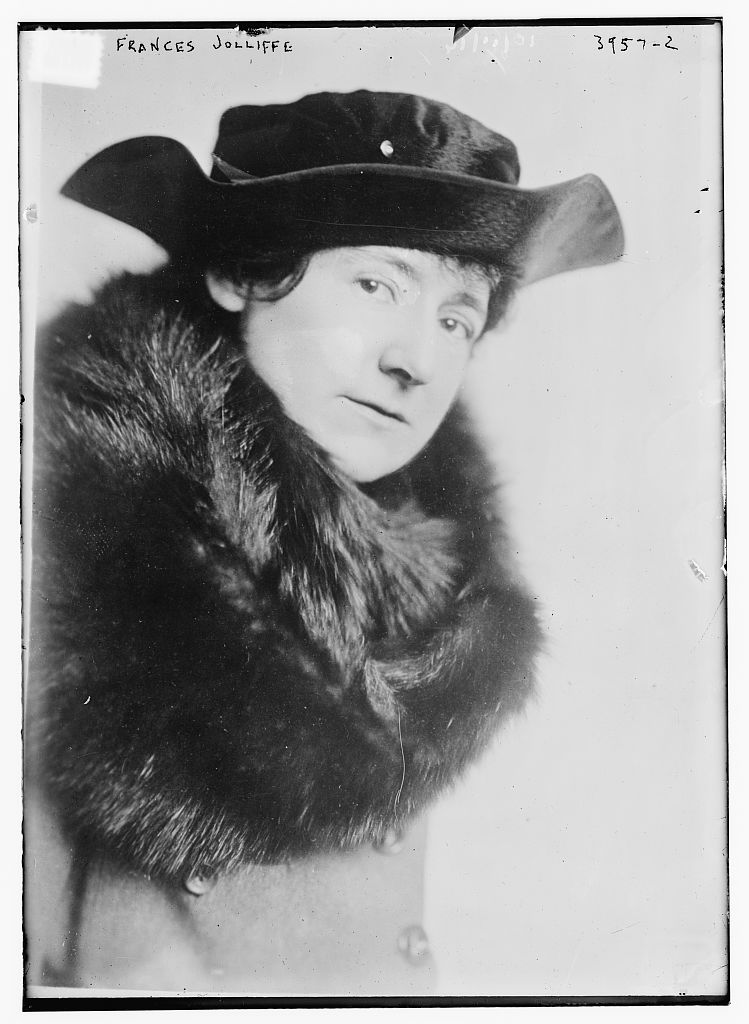
- Born: Frances Borgia Jolliffe; 1873; San Francisco, California, US
- Died: November 9, 1925 (aged 51–52); San Francisco, California, US
- Occupations: Drama critic, suffragist

Frances Borgia Jolliffe (1873 – November 9, 1925) was an American actress, journalist, and suffragist, and arts editor at the San Francisco Evening Bulletin.

== Early life ==
Jolliffe was born in San Francisco, one of the ten children born to William Howard Jolliffe and Johanna Margaret Donohue Jolliffe. Her mother was born in Ireland; her father was born in England, and worked at the Port of San Francisco. She graduated from Vassar College in 1893.

== Career ==
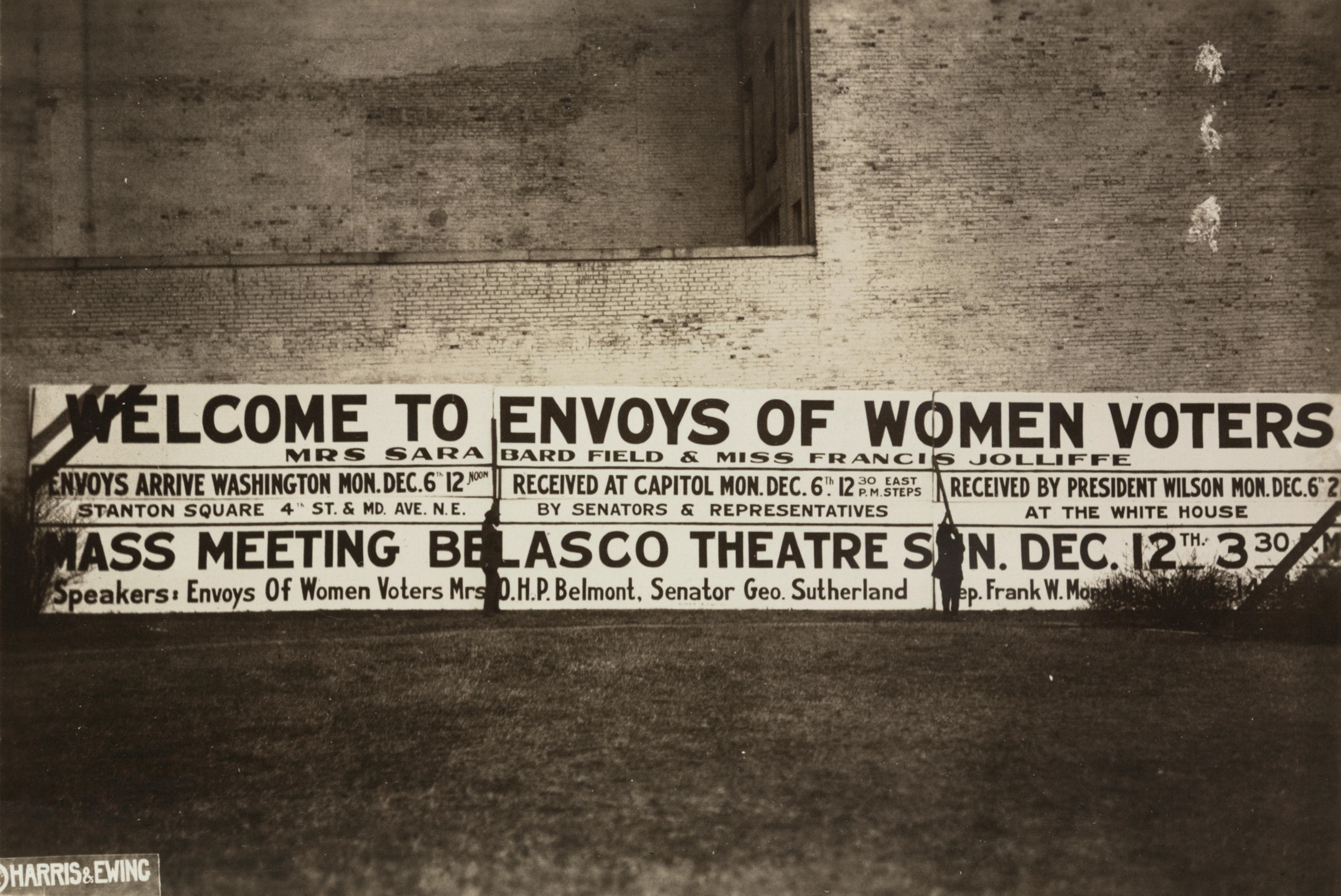
A billboard welcoming the suffrage envoys, Sara Bard Field and Frances Jolliffe, to Washington, D.C. in 1915; from the Library of Congress.

=== Theatre ===
Jolliffe was a "society actress" in San Francisco as a young woman. She appeared on the New York stage in 1900, and with Helena Modjeska's company.

She was performing arts editor at the San Francisco Evening Bulletin newspaper. In that role, she interviewed Enrico Caruso and reviewed Ruth St. Denis (whose solo performance of Radha bored Jolliffe in 1911). Artist Theodore Wores painted her portrait.

=== Suffrage ===
Jolliffe was a suffragist in California, and in 1913 became one of the first two women admitted as lobbyists to attend a meeting of the California legislature; they spoke to assemblymen about a mothers' pension bill.

Jolliffe, Sara Bard Field, Ingeborg Kindstedt and Maria Kindberg set out on a road trip from San Francisco to Washington, D.C. in September 1915, as "suffrage envoys", to deliver a "monster petition" of thousands of signatures supporting women's suffrage, and meet with President Woodrow Wilson and members of Congress. However, Jolliffe dropped out of the trip in Sacramento, their first stop, because of some undisclosed illness. She rejoined the group in Albany, New York, in time to participate in the East coast part of the trip, and to deliver the petition to Congress and President Wilson. "Anybody who thinks the California women don’t care about the vote had just better go out there and try to take it away from them," Jolliffe told an audience at a New York City rally during one of their stops.

=== War work ===
During World War I, Jolliffe went to France as a war correspondent, to report on conditions in hospitals and refugee centers; on her return, she spoke at fundraising events for war relief causes.

== Personal life ==
In 1912, Jolliffe caused a scandal when she smoked a cigarette in a hotel lobby in Lawrence, Massachusetts. Jolliffe died in 1925, in San Francisco, aged 52 years.
