= Kenneth L. Karst =

American legal scholar

Kenneth Leslie Karst
- Born: 26 June 1929
- Died: 9 April 2019 (aged 89)
- Occupation: Professor of Law
- Known for: Constitutional Law

Kenneth L. Karst (26 June 1929 – 9 April 2019) was an American professor at the University of California, Los Angeles (UCLA) who wrote extensively on constitutional law and a wide range of other subjects. He was cited 12 times by the Supreme Court of the United States.

== Life ==
Kenneth L. Karst was born on 29 June 1929. He earned his bachelor's degree from UCLA in 1950, and graduated magna cum laude from Harvard Law School in 1953. He worked at Latham & Watkins for a short period, and was then a judge advocate general in the United States Air Force. After this he was a professor of Law at Ohio State University. He joined the faculty of the UCLA School of Law in 1965, where he taught for the next forty years. Karst, his wife Smiley and their four children moved to Santa Monica in 1965. The children all attended Lincoln Junior High and Santa Monica High School.

Karst was appointed David G. Price and Dallas P. Price Distinguished Professor of Law. He specialized in constitutional law, and was interested in the relationship of the constitution to evolving public and political attitudes. He believed in ensuring equal access to legal education, and helped the law school develop outreach programs aimed at minorities. He also contributed to debates on fairness and equal access to justice, as promised by the law. Thus in 1977 Karst wrote of Roe v. Wade that it involved some of the most important aspects of a woman’s independence, control over her own destiny, and social roles. Focusing on the equality aspects of the right requires moving away from a balancing of woman versus fetus towards an examination of abortion as “an issue going to women’s position in society in relation to men." Karst’s view was shared and expanded upon by numerous scholars and eventually adopted by the Court.

In 2000 an issue of the UCLA Law Review was dedicated to Karst. It noted that the Supreme Court had cited him twelve times. Other federal courts had cited him 77 times. Karst and his wife Smiley entered a health care facility in Santa Cruz in 2013. He died on 9 April 2019 at the age of 89.

== Awards and honors ==
Awards and honors included:

- Dartmouth Medal (1987) for best reference work from the American Library Association for Encyclopedia of the American Constitution (co-editor).
- James A. Rawley Prize (1990) from the Organization of American Historians for his book Belonging to America: Equal Citizenship and the Constitution.
- Teacher of the year by graduating UCLA law students (two occasions)
- Dickson Award from UCLA in 2010-11 for continuing his distinguished academic pursuits in retirement
- Fellow of the American Academy of Arts and Sciences (1996)

== Publications ==
Karst wrote lengthy articles in the Law Review on subjects that included the First, Fifth and Fourteenth amendments; women's rights; affirmative action; civil rights and discrimination; gay and lesbian rights; lawyers and social change; and land-use reform in Latin America. Books included:

- Kenneth L. Karst (1963), Land Tenure and Legal Institutions, pp. 130 pages
- Kenneth L. Karst (1966), Latin American Legal Institutions: Problems for Comparative Study, University of California, Latin American Center, pp. 738 pages
- Kenneth L. Karst (1975), Latin American Land Reform: The Uses of Confiscation, University of Wisconsin, Land Tenure Center, pp. 46 pages
- Kenneth L. Karst; Keith S. Rosenn (1975), Law and Development in Latin America: A Case Book, University of California Press, pp. 738 pages
- Kenneth L. Karst; Audrey J. Schwartz; Murray L. Schwartz (1976), The Evolution of Law in the Barrios of Caracas, Latin American Center, pp. 125 pages
- Arvo Van Alstyne; Kenneth L. Karst; Jules Gerard. (1976), Sum & Substance of Constitutional Law, Center for Creative Educational Services, pp. 630 pages
- Kenneth L. Karst (1986), Essential Principles of Constitutional Law, Essential Principles Series, Center for Creative Educational Services, Josephson/Kluwer Legal Educational Centers, Sum & Substance, pp. 181 pages, ISBN 0940366282
- Kenneth L. Karst; Adam Winkler, eds. (1986), Encyclopedia of the American Constitution, vol. 1–6, MacMillan
- Kenneth L. Karst (1989), Belonging to America: Equal Citizenship and the Constitution, Yale University Press, pp. 329 pages
- Kenneth L. Karst (1993), Law's Promise, Law's Expression: Visions of Power in the Politics of Gender, Race and Religion, Yale University Press, pp. 321 pages

== Sources ==
- Casuso, Jorge (16 April 2019), Leading Constitutional Law Scholar and Longtime Santa Monica Resident Dies at 89
- Karst, Kenneth L. (in French), BnF Bibliothèque Nationale De France
- Mnookin, Jennifer; Kisliuk, Bill (27 June 2019), In Memoriam: Constitutional Scholar Kenneth Karst
- Smith, Priscilla J. (September 20, 2021), Thomas E. Dobbs v. Jackson Women's Health Organization (PDF), Supreme Court of the United States
