= Daryl Michael Scott =

Historian

Daryl Michael Scott is an American historian and author. He is a professor of History & Geography at Morgan State University.

He has a BA from Marquette University and a PhD in History from Stanford University.

== Awards and honors ==
His book Contempt and Pity won the 1998 James Rawley Prize of the Organization of American Historians for the best work in race relations.

== Books ==
- Contempt and Pity: Social Policy and the Image of the Damaged Black Psyche, 1880-1996 (University of North Carolina Press, 1997)

"...The great book on this is Daryl Scott’s Contempt and Pity. He’s a very good black historian" (Malcolm Gladwell).
