= Sherry L. Smith =

American historian

Sherry Lynn Smith (born 1951) is an American historian, and University Distinguished Professor at Southern Methodist University.

From 2008 to 2009, she was President of the Western History Association.

== Works ==
- Smith, Sherry L. (November 9, 2000). Reimagining Indians: Native Americans through Anglo Eyes, 1880-1940. Oxford University Press. ISBN 9780195350432.
- Smith, Sherry L. (May 3, 2012). Hippies, Indians, and the Fight for Red Power. Oxford University Press. ISBN 9780199939374.
- Smith, Sherry L. (February 1, 1991). The View from Officers' Row: Army Perceptions of Western Indians. University of Arizona Press. ISBN 9780816512454.
- Smith, Sherry L. (2001). Sagebrush Soldier: Private William Earl Smith's View of the Sioux War of 1876. University of Oklahoma Press. ISBN 9780806133355.
