= Legacy of Harriet Tubman =

Impact of African-American abolitionist

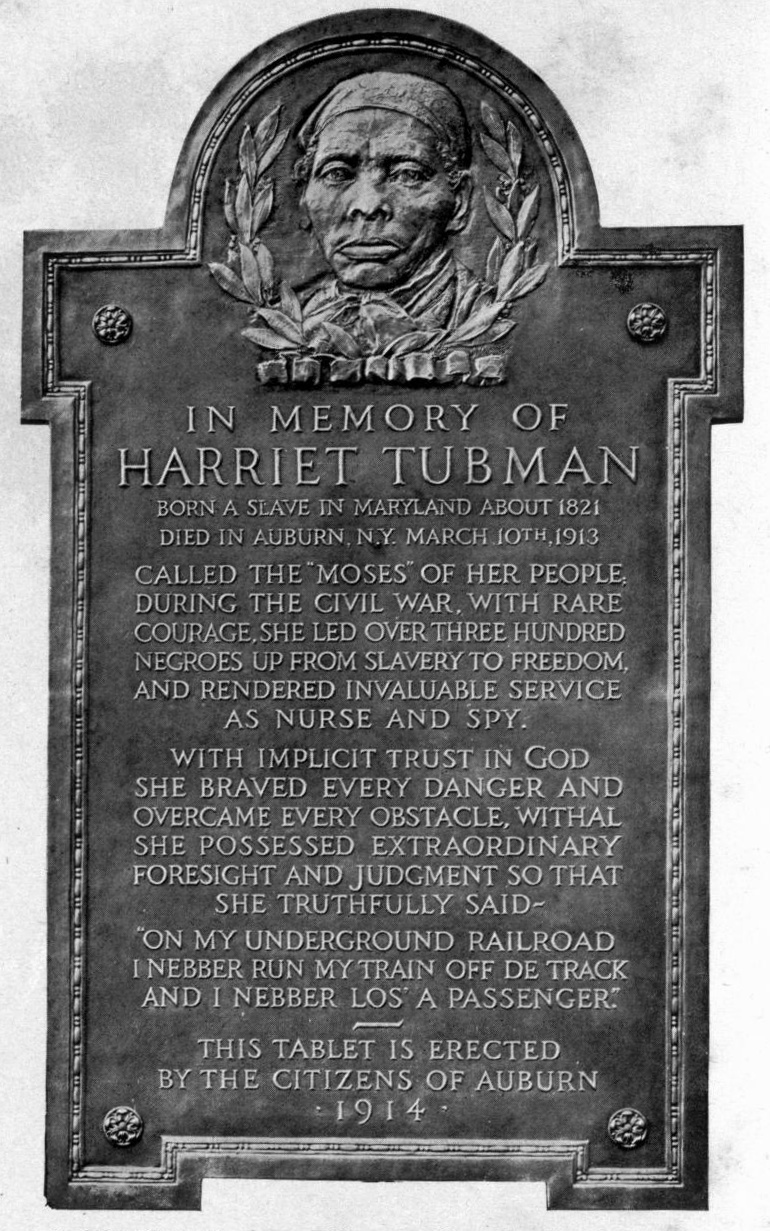
Tubman's commemorative plaque in Auburn, New York, erected 1914

Harriet Tubman (1822–1913) was an American abolitionist and social activist. After escaping slavery, Tubman made some 13 missions to rescue approximately 70 enslaved people, including her family and friends, using the network of antislavery activists and safe houses known as the Underground Railroad. During the American Civil War, she served as an armed scout and spy for the Union Army. In her later years, Tubman was an activist in the movement for women's suffrage.

Widely known and well-respected while she was alive, Tubman became an American icon in the years after she died. A survey at the end of the 20th century named her as one of the most famous civilians in American history before the Civil War, third only to Betsy Ross and Paul Revere. She inspired generations of African Americans struggling for equality and civil rights; she was praised by leaders across the political spectrum.

== Memorials ==
=== National parks, monuments and historical sites ===
In 2013, President Barack Obama created the Harriet Tubman Underground Railroad National Monument, consisting of federal lands on Maryland's Eastern Shore at Blackwater National Wildlife Refuge. The Harriet Tubman National Historical Park in Auburn was authorized by the 2015 National Defense Authorization Act and established on January 10, 2017. The act also created the Harriet Tubman Underground Railroad National Historical Park in Maryland within the authorized boundary of the national monument, while permitting later additional acquisitions.

The Smithsonian Institution's National Museum of African American History and Culture has items owned by Tubman and related items, including one of the few photographic portraits of Tubman and postcards with images of her funeral.

The Salem Chapel in St. Catharines, where Tubman worshipped while living in the town, was designated a National Historic Site of Canada in 1999. Tubman herself was designated a National Historic Person after the Canadian Historic Sites and Monuments Board recommended it in 2005.

=== State and local historical sites ===
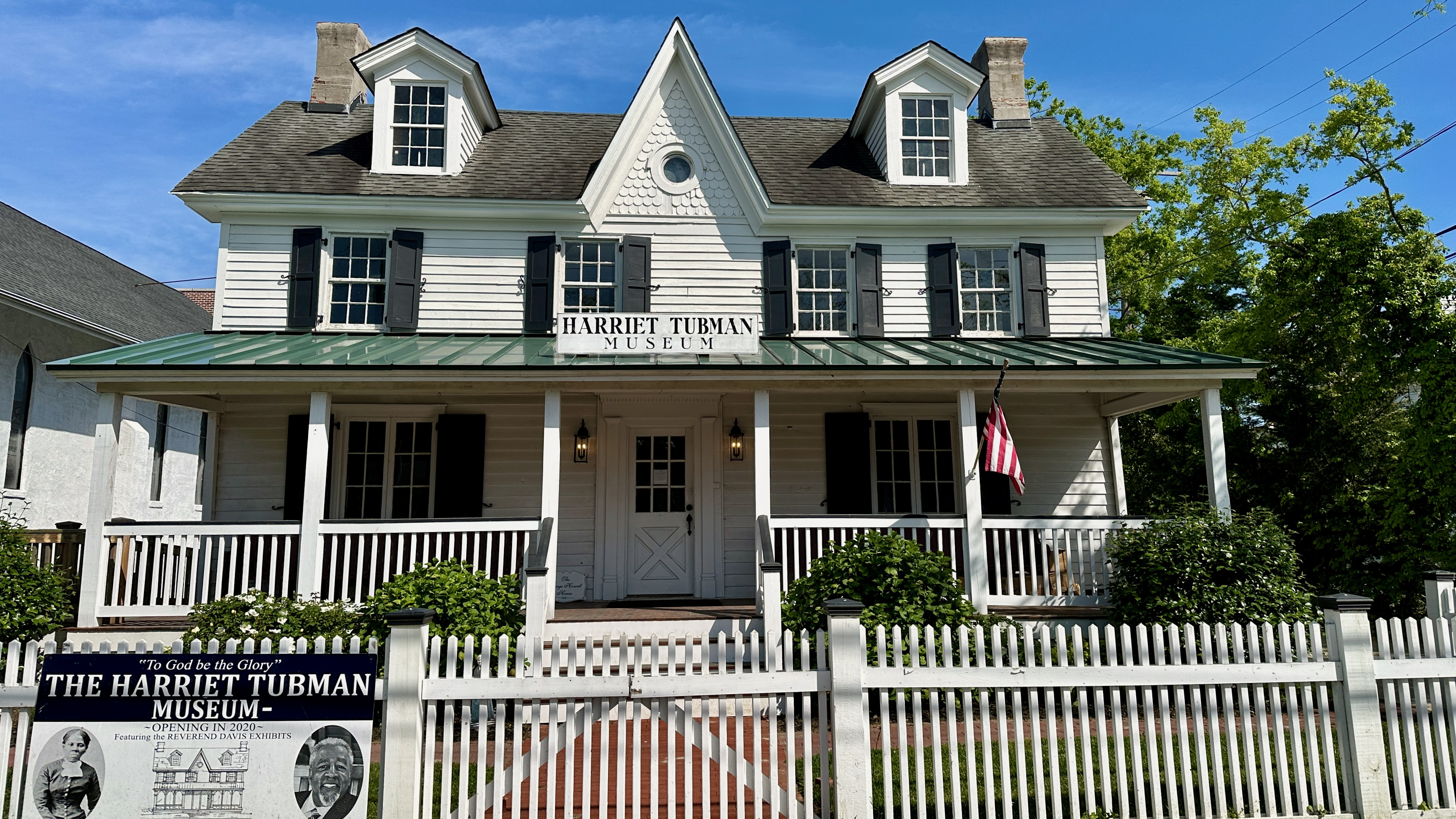
Harriet Tubman Museum in Cape May, New Jersey

In 1937, a gravestone for Harriet Tubman was erected by the Empire State Federation of Women's Clubs; it was listed on the National Register of Historic Places in 1999. The Harriet Tubman Home was abandoned after 1920, but was later renovated by the AME Zion Church and opened as a museum and education center. A Harriet Tubman Memorial Library was opened nearby in 1979.

The Harriet Tubman Museum in Cape May, New Jersey opened to the public on Juneteenth in 2021. Tubman worked in Cape May as a cook and housekeeper for several summers in the 1850s.

Other state and local historical sites about Tubman include the Harriet Tubman Underground Railroad State Park and Harriet Tubman Memorial Garden in Maryland.

== Artistic portrayals ==
Tubman is the subject of works of art including songs, novels, sculptures, paintings, movies, and theatrical productions.

=== Visual arts ===
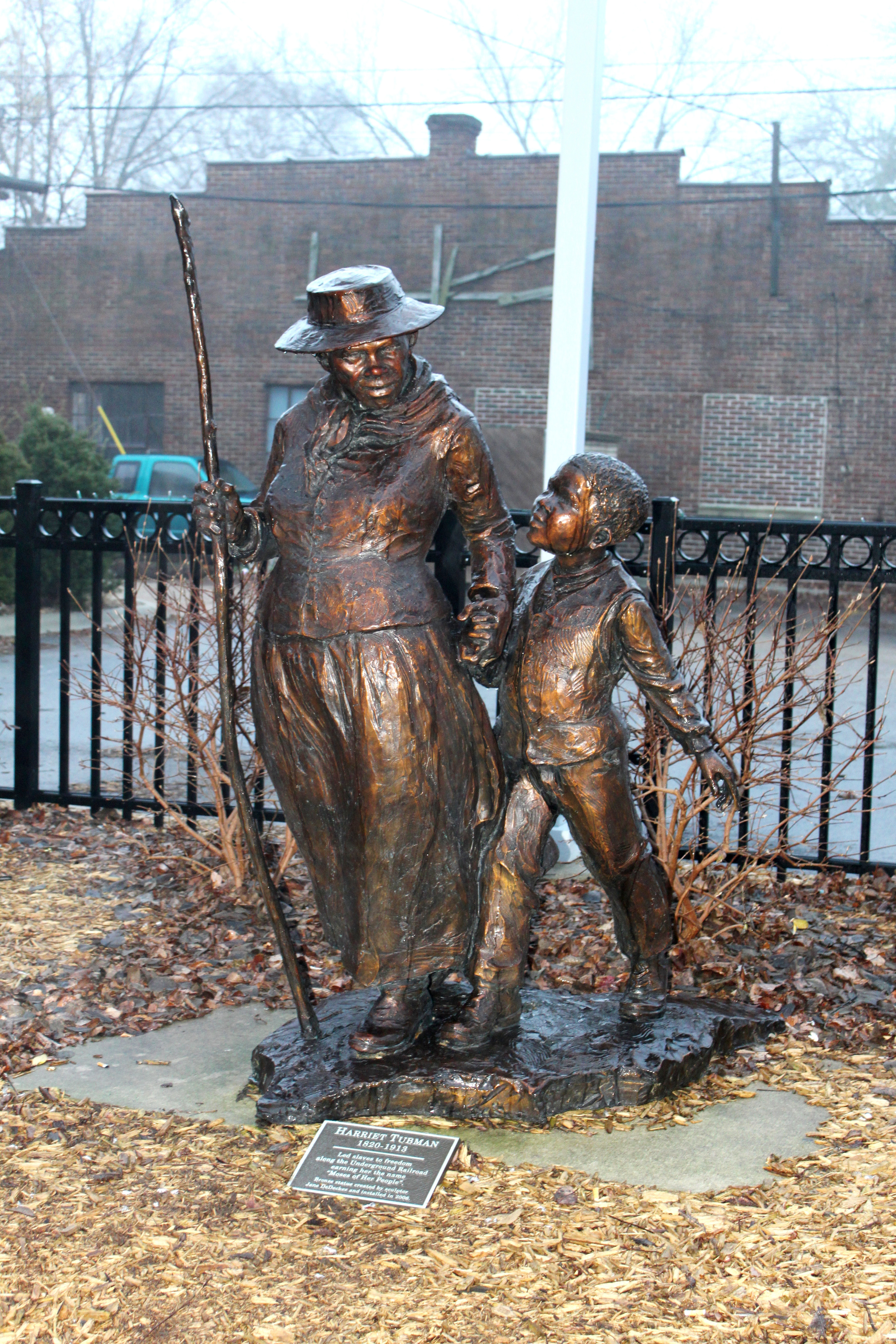
Statue by Jane DeDecker commemorating Tubman in Ypsilanti, Michigan

Sculptures of Tubman have been placed in several American cities. In 1995, sculptor Jane DeDecker created a statue of Tubman leading a child, which was placed in Mesa, Arizona. Copies were subsequently installed in several other cities, including one at Brenau University in Gainesville, Georgia; it was the first statue honoring Tubman at an institution in the Old South. Step on Board, a bronze sculpture by artist Fern Cunningham was placed at the entrance to Boston's Harriet Tubman Park in 1999. It was the first memorial to a woman on city-owned land. Swing Low, a 13-foot (400 cm) statue of Tubman by Alison Saar, was erected in Manhattan in 2008. In 2009, Salisbury University in Salisbury, Maryland unveiled a statue created by James Hill, an arts professor at the university. It was the first sculpture of Tubman placed in the region where she was born. In 2023, a twenty-five-foot-tall (7.6 m) Tubman monument called Shadow of a Face was placed in Harriet Tubman Square in Newark, New Jersey. Sculptor Ed Dwight created a 14-foot monument to Tubman's participation in the Combahee River Raid, which depicts Tubman flanked by soldiers, with escapees running toward them. It was unveiled at the Tabernacle Baptist Church in Beaufort, South Carolina on June 1, 2024.

=== Music and theater ===
Musicians have celebrated her in works such as "The Ballad of Harriet Tubman" by Woody Guthrie, the song "Harriet Tubman" by Walter Robinson, and the instrumental "Harriet Tubman" by Wynton Marsalis. There have been several operas based on Tubman's life, including Scottish composer Thea Musgrave's Harriet, the Woman Called Moses, which premiered in 1985 at the Virginia Opera. American composer Nkeiru Okoye wrote Harriet Tubman: When I Crossed that Line to Freedom, a two-act opera first performed in 2014.

In 2018 the Muziektheater Transparant company premiered the opera Harriet: Scenes from the Life of Harriet Tubman by Mexican composer Hilda Paredes at the Muziekgebouw aan 't IJ in Amsterdam. The production then toured internationally, appearing at festivals such as the Huddersfield Contemporary Music Festival in England and the Festival Internacional Cervantino in Mexico. The libretto was based on works by Puerto Rican poet Mayra Santos-Febres and Dutch writer Lex Bohlmeijer.

Non-musical stage plays based on Tubman's life appeared as early as the 1930s, when May Miller and Willis Richardson included a play about Tubman in their 1934 collection Negro History in Thirteen Plays. Other plays about Tubman include Harriet's Return by Karen Jones Meadows and Harriet Tubman Visits a Therapist by Carolyn Gage.

=== Literature ===
In printed fiction, in 1948 Tubman was the subject of Anne Parrish's A Clouded Star, a biographical novel that was criticized for presenting negative stereotypes of African-Americans. A Woman Called Moses, a 1976 novel by Marcy Heidish, was criticized for portraying a drinking, swearing, sexually active version of Tubman. Tubman biographer James A. McGowan called the novel a "deliberate distortion". The 2019 novel The Tubman Command by Elizabeth Cobbs focuses on Tubman's leadership of the Combahee River Raid. Tubman also appears as a character in other novels, such as Terry Bisson's 1988 science fiction novel Fire on the Mountain, James McBride's 2013 novel The Good Lord Bird, and the 2019 novel The Water Dancer by Ta-Nehisi Coates.

=== Film, television and video games ===
Tubman's life was dramatized on television in 1963 on the CBS series The Great Adventure in an episode titled "Go Down Moses" with Ruby Dee starring as Tubman. In December 1978, Cicely Tyson portrayed her for the NBC miniseries A Woman Called Moses, based on the novel by Heidish. In 1994, Alfre Woodard played Tubman in the television film Race to Freedom: The Underground Railroad. In 2017, Aisha Hinds portrayed Tubman in the second season of the WGN America drama series Underground. In 2018, Christine Horn portrayed her in an episode of the science fiction series Timeless, which covers her role in the Civil War. Harriet, a biographical film directed by Kasi Lemmons and co-written by Lemmons and Gregory Allen Howard, premiered at the Toronto International Film Festival in September 2019. Cynthia Erivo starred in the title role. The film made $43 million against a production budget of $17 million, and received Academy Award nominations for Best Actress and Best Song.

In the video game Sid Meier's Civilization VII, a character based on Tubman is a playable "leader", with abilities focused on Espionage.

== Currency and postage ==
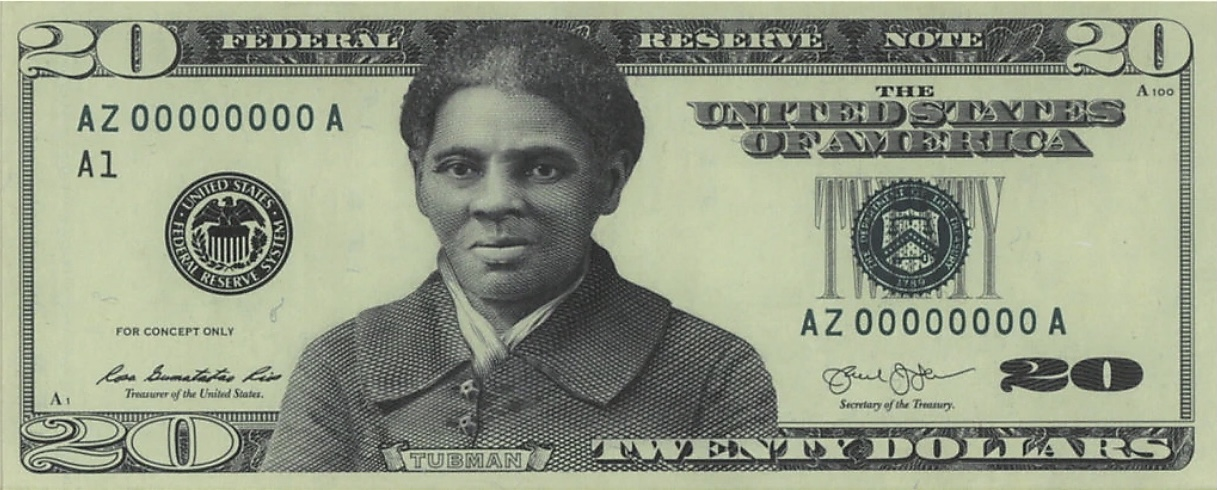
Official $20 bill prototype prepared by the Bureau of Engraving and Printing in 2016

Tubman was the first African-American woman to be honored on a U.S. postage stamp when a 13-cent stamp designed by artist Jerry Pinkney was issued by the United States Postal Service in 1978. A second, 32-cent stamp featuring Tubman was issued in 1995.

Beginning in 2016, there were plans to add a portrait of Tubman to the front of the twenty-dollar bill, moving the portrait of President Andrew Jackson, who was a slaveholder, to the reverse of the bill. Scott Bessent, the U.S. secretary of the treasury, stated in a July 2026 interview that the placement of Tubman's portrait on the bill is no longer planned. In 2024, the United States Mint issued three commemorative coins featuring Tubman, with each coin depicting Tubman at a different stage of her life. A half dollar clad coin depicts Tubman during the Civil War. A one dollar silver coin represents her work with the Underground Railroad. A five dollar gold coin shows her in old age.

== Other honors and commemorations ==
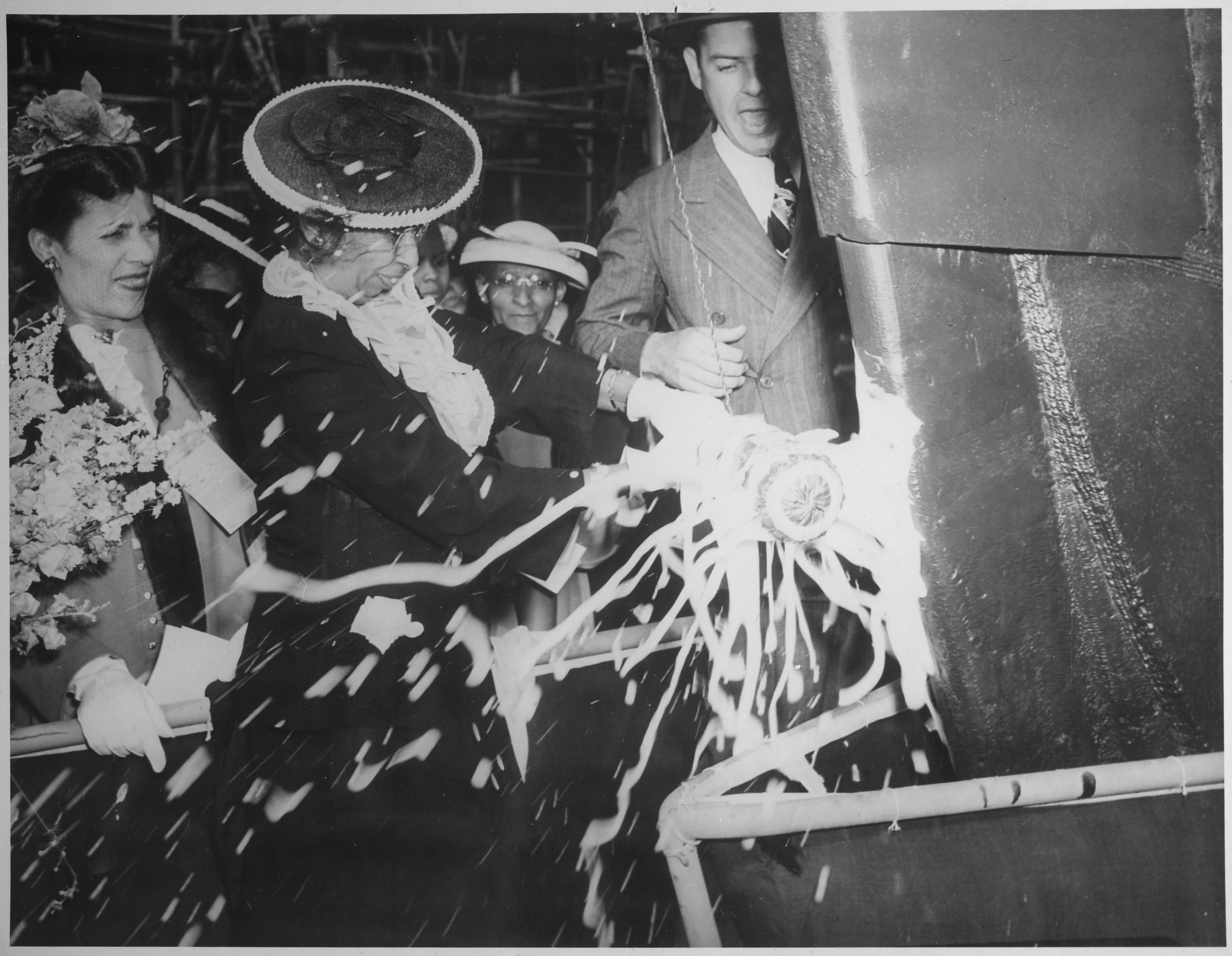
Tubman's great-niece, Eva Stewart Northrup, launching the SS Harriet Tubman in 1944.

The city of Auburn, New York, where Tubman was a longtime resident, commemorated her life with a plaque on the courthouse.

On June 28, 2024, the 81st General Convention of the Episcopal Church voted to commemorate Tubman on March 10 as part of their Calendar of the Church Year. Tubman was previously commemorated together with Elizabeth Cady Stanton, Amelia Bloomer, and Sojourner Truth on July 20. The liturgical calendar of the Evangelical Lutheran Church in America also remembers Tubman and Sojourner Truth on March 10. Since 2003, the state of New York has commemorated Tubman on March 10, although the day is not a legal holiday.

Numerous structures, organizations, and other entities have been named in Tubman's honor. These include dozens of schools, streets and highways in several states, and various church groups, social organizations, and government agencies. In 1944, the United States Maritime Commission launched the SS Harriet Tubman, its first Liberty ship ever named for a black woman.

Tubman was posthumously inducted into the National Women's Hall of Fame in 1973, the Maryland Women's Hall of Fame in 1985, the National Abolition Hall of Fame in 2005, the New Jersey Hall of Fame in 2008, and the Military Intelligence Hall of Fame in 2019. In November 2024, Maryland Governor Wes Moore posthumously commissioned Tubman as a one-star general in the Maryland National Guard.

Celebration of the Black victory in the Montgomery Riverfront Brawl frequently invoked and reflected on Tubman's legacy. The Shade Room highlighted a Twitter user who captioned a photograph of the brawl with "The Nigga Navy docking the SS Harriet no Tubman to battle the Saltines in Montgomery, Alabama", and a tweet celebrating the victory included an illustration of Tubman holding a folding chair like one used by a Black defender in the brawl.
