= Harriet Tubman =

American abolitionist (1822–1913)

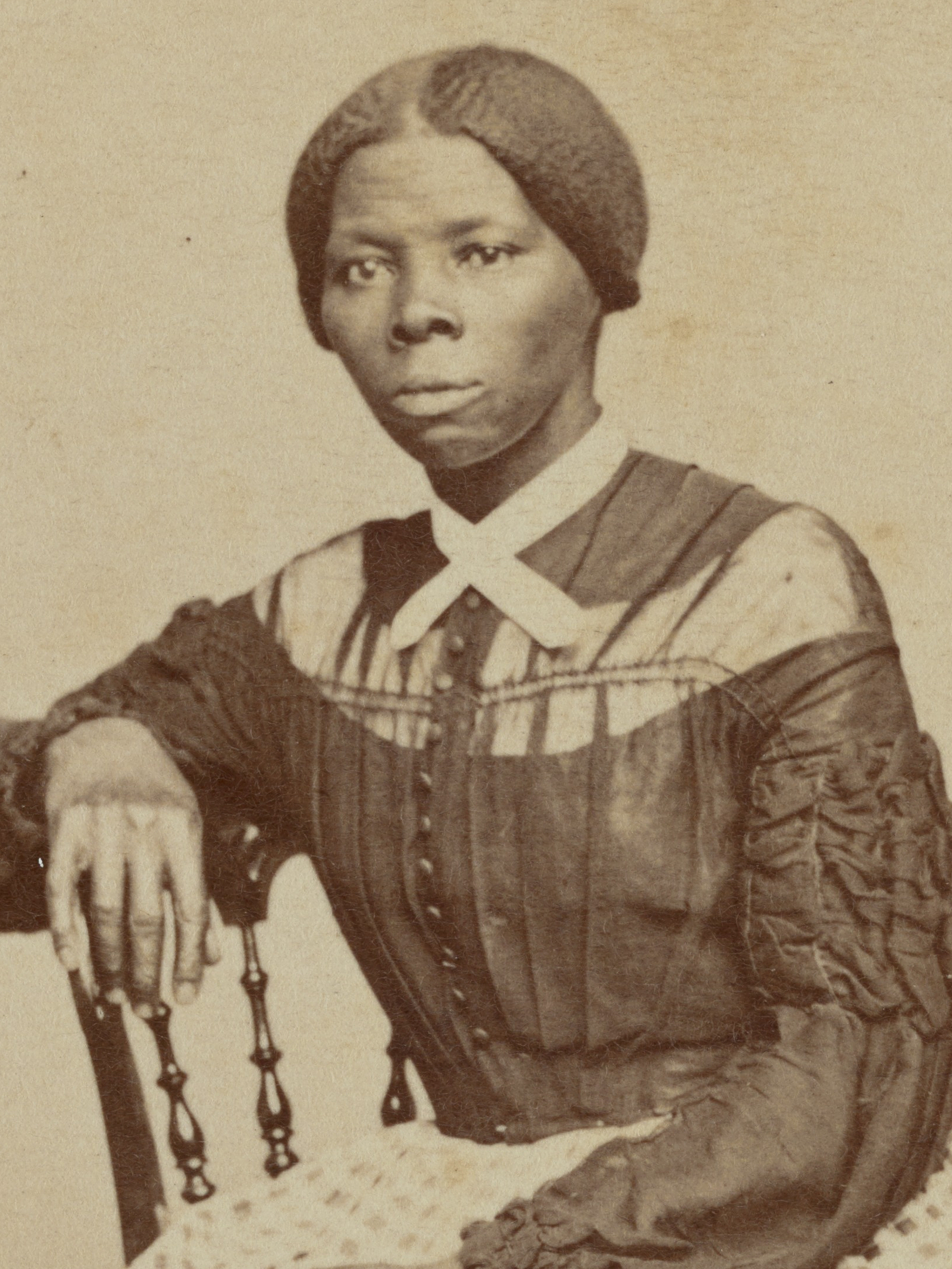
- Tubman, c. 1868/1869
- Born: Araminta Ross c. March 1822; Dorchester County, Maryland, U.S.
- Died: March 10, 1913 (aged 90–91); Auburn, New York, U.S.
- Resting place: Fort Hill Cemetery; 42.9246°N 76.5750°W
- Other names: Minty; Moses
- Occupations: Civil War scout; spy; nurse; suffragist; civil rights activist
- Known for: Guiding enslaved people to freedom
- Spouses: John Tubman (m. 1844; div. 1851) Nelson Davis (m. 1869; died 1888)
- Relatives: See Harriet Tubman's family
- Military career
- Allegiance: United States
- Affiliation: U.S. Department of War
- Rank: Brigadier General (posthumous) of the Maryland Army National Guard
- Conflicts: American Civil War; Raid on Combahee Ferry; Second Battle of Fort Wagner

Harriet Tubman (born Araminta Ross, c. March 1822 – March 10, 1913) was an American abolitionist and social activist. After escaping slavery, Tubman made some 13 missions to rescue approximately 70 enslaved people, including her family and friends, using the network of antislavery activists and safe houses known collectively as the Underground Railroad. During the American Civil War, she served as an armed scout and spy for the Union Army. In her later years, Tubman was an activist in the movement for women's suffrage.

Born into slavery in Dorchester County, Maryland, Tubman was beaten and whipped by enslavers as a child. Early in life, she suffered a traumatic head wound when an irate overseer threw a heavy metal weight, intending to hit another slave, but hit her instead. The injury caused dizziness, pain, and spells of hypersomnia, which occurred throughout her life. After her injury, Tubman began experiencing strange visions and vivid dreams, which she ascribed to premonitions from God. These experiences, combined with her Methodist upbringing, led her to become devoutly religious.

In 1849 Tubman escaped to Philadelphia, only to return to Maryland to rescue her family soon after. Slowly, one group at a time, she brought relatives with her out of the state, guiding dozens of other enslaved people to freedom. Tubman (or "Moses", as she was called) traveled by night and in extreme secrecy, and she later said she "never lost a passenger". After the Fugitive Slave Act of 1850 was passed, she helped guide escapees farther north into British North America (Canada) and helped newly freed people find work. Tubman met John Brown in 1858 and helped him plan and recruit supporters for his 1859 raid on Harpers Ferry.

When the Civil War began, Tubman worked for the Union Army, first as a cook and nurse and then as an armed scout and spy. For her guidance of the raid at Combahee Ferry, which liberated more than 700 enslaved people, she is widely credited as the first woman to lead an armed military operation in the United States. After the war, she retired to the family home on property she had purchased in 1859 in Auburn, New York, where she cared for her aging parents. She was active in the women's suffrage movement until illness overtook her and she was admitted to a home for elderly African Americans, which she had helped establish years earlier. Tubman is commonly viewed as an icon of courage and freedom.

== Birth and family ==
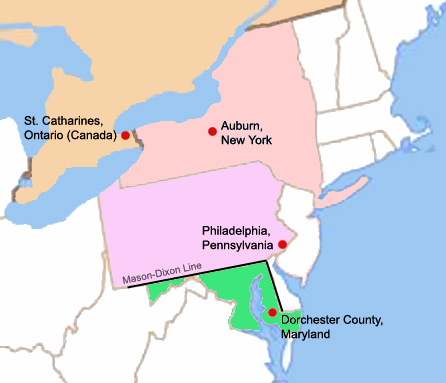
A map of key locations in Tubman's life

Tubman was born Araminta "Minty" Ross to enslaved parents, Harriet ("Rit") Green and Ben Ross. Rit was enslaved by Mary Pattison Brodess (and later her son Edward). Ben was enslaved by Anthony Thompson, who became Mary Brodess's second husband and who ran a large plantation near the Blackwater River in the Madison area of Dorchester County, Maryland.

As with many enslaved people in the United States, neither the exact year nor place of Tubman's birth is known. Tubman reported the year of her birth as 1825, while her death certificate lists 1815 and her gravestone lists 1820. Historian Kate Larson's 2004 biography of Tubman records the year as 1822, based on a midwife payment and several other historical documents, including her runaway advertisement. Based on Larson's work, more recent biographies have accepted March 1822 as the most likely timing of Tubman's birth.

Tubman's maternal grandmother, Modesty, arrived in the U.S. on a slave ship from Africa; no information is available about her other ancestors. As a child, Tubman was told that she seemed like an Ashanti person because of her character traits, though no evidence has been found to confirm or deny this lineage. Her mother (who may have had a white father) was a cook for the Brodess family. Her father was a skilled woodsman who managed the timber work on Thompson's plantation. They married around 1808 and according to court records had nine children together: Linah, Mariah Ritty, Soph, Robert, Minty (Harriet), Ben, Rachel, Henry, and Moses.

Rit struggled to keep her family together as slavery threatened to tear it apart. Edward Brodess sold three of her daughters (Linah, Mariah Ritty, and Soph), separating them from the family forever. When a trader from Georgia approached Brodess about buying Rit's youngest son, Moses, she hid him for a month, aided by other enslaved people and freedmen in the community. At one point she confronted Brodess about the sale. Finally, Brodess and "the Georgia man" came toward the slave quarters to seize the child, where Rit told them, "You are after my son; but the first man that comes into my house, I will split his head open." Brodess backed away and abandoned the sale. Tubman's biographers agree that stories told about this event within the family influenced her belief in the possibilities of resistance.

== Childhood ==
Tubman's mother was assigned to "the big house" and had scarce time for her own family; consequently, as a child Tubman took care of a younger brother and baby, as was typical in large families. When she was five or six years old, Brodess hired her out as a nursemaid to a woman named "Miss Susan". Tubman was ordered to care for the baby and rock the cradle as it slept; when the baby woke up and cried, Tubman was whipped. She later recounted a particular day when she was lashed five times before breakfast. She carried the scars for the rest of her life. She found ways to resist, such as running away for five days, wearing layers of clothing as protection against beatings, and fighting back.

Also in her childhood, Tubman was sent to work for a planter named James Cook. She had to check his muskrat traps in nearby marshes, even after contracting measles. She became so ill that Cook sent her back to Brodess, where her mother nursed her back to health. Brodess then hired her out again. She spoke later of her acute childhood homesickness, comparing herself to "the boy on the Swanee River", an allusion to Stephen Foster's song "Old Folks at Home". As she grew older and stronger, she was assigned to field and forest work, driving oxen, plowing, and hauling logs.

As an adolescent, Tubman suffered a severe head injury when involved in an altercation between an overseer and a male slave who had absconded from work without permission and had gone to the store. While Tubman and others tried to defend the man from the overseer, the overseer threw a two-pound (1 kg) metal weight at him. The weight struck Tubman instead, which she said "broke my skull". Bleeding and unconscious, she was returned to her enslaver's house and laid on the seat of a loom, where she remained without medical care for two days. Eventually, Tubman's mother was allowed to tend to her. Tubman remained in a comatose state for weeks.

After the incident, Tubman frequently experienced extremely painful headaches. She also began having seizures and would seemingly fall unconscious, although she claimed to be aware of her surroundings while appearing to be asleep. Larson suggests she may have had temporal lobe epilepsy, possibly as a result of brain injury; Clinton suggests her condition may have been narcolepsy or cataplexy. The condition remained with her for the rest of her life.

After her injury, Tubman began experiencing visions and vivid dreams, which she interpreted as revelations from God. These spiritual experiences had a profound effect on Tubman's personality, and she acquired a passionate faith in God. Although Tubman was illiterate, she was told Bible stories by her mother and likely attended a Methodist church with her family. Mystical inspiration guided her actions. She rejected the teachings of white preachers who urged enslaved people to be passive and obedient victims to those who trafficked and enslaved them; instead she found guidance in the Old Testament tales of deliverance. This religious perspective informed her actions throughout her life.

== Family and first husband ==
Anthony Thompson promised to manumit Tubman's father at age 45. After Thompson died, his son followed through with that promise in 1840. Tubman's father continued working as a timber estimator and foreman for the Thompson family. Later in the 1840s, Tubman paid a white attorney five dollars (equivalent to $170 in 2025) to investigate the legal status of her mother, Rit. The lawyer discovered that Atthow Pattison, the grandfather of Mary Brodess, indicated in his will that Rit and any of her children would be manumitted at age 45, and that any children born after she reached age 45 would be freeborn. The Pattison and Brodess families ignored this stipulation when they inherited the enslaved family, but taking legal action to enforce it was an impossible task for Tubman.

Around 1844, she married John Tubman, a free black man. Although little is known about him or their time together, the union was complicated because of her enslaved status. The mother's status dictated that of children, and any children born to Harriet and John would be enslaved. Such blended marriages – free people of color marrying enslaved people – were not uncommon on the Eastern Shore of Maryland, where by this time, half the black population was free. Most African-American families had both free and enslaved members. Larson suggests that they might have planned to buy Tubman's freedom.

Tubman changed her name from Araminta to Harriet soon after her marriage, though the exact timing is unclear. Larson suggests this happened right after the wedding, and Clinton suggests that it coincided with Tubman's plans to escape from slavery. She adopted her mother's name, possibly as part of a religious conversion or to honor another relative.

== Escape from slavery ==
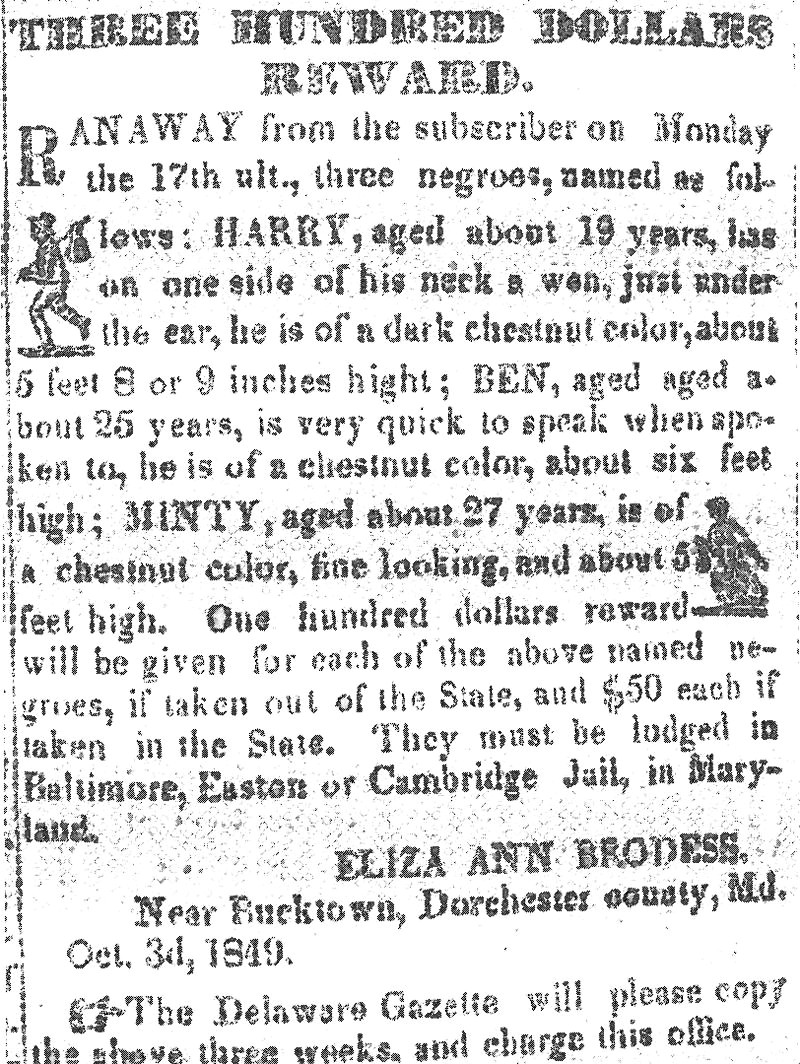
A notice offering a reward of US$100 (equivalent to $3,870 in 2025) each for the capture and return of "Minty" (Harriet Tubman) and her brothers Henry and Ben

In 1849, Tubman became ill again, which diminished her value to slave traders. Edward Brodess tried to sell her but could not find a buyer. Angry at him for trying to sell her and for continuing to enslave her relatives, Tubman began to pray for God to make Brodess change his ways. She said later: "I prayed all night long for my master till the first of March; and all the time he was bringing people to look at me, and trying to sell me." When it appeared as though a sale was being concluded, Tubman changed her prayer: "First of March I began to pray, 'Oh Lord, if you ain't never going to change that man's heart, kill him, Lord, and take him out of the way'." A week later, Brodess died, and Tubman expressed regret for her earlier sentiments.

As in many estate settlements, Brodess's death increased the likelihood that Tubman would be sold and her family broken apart. His widow, Eliza, began working to sell the people enslaved by the family. Tubman refused to wait for the Brodess family to decide her fate, despite her husband's efforts to dissuade her. She later said "there was one of two things I had a right to, liberty or death; if I could not have one, I would have the other".

Tubman and her brothers, Ben and Henry, escaped from slavery on September 17, 1849. Tubman had been hired out to Anthony Thompson (the son of her father's former owner), who owned a large plantation in an area called Poplar Neck in neighboring Caroline County; it is likely her brothers labored for Thompson as well. Because they were hired out, Eliza Brodess probably did not recognize their absence as an escape attempt for some time. Two weeks later, she posted a runaway notice in the Cambridge Democrat, offering a reward of up to US$100 each (equivalent to $3,870 in 2025) for their capture and return to slavery. Once they had left, Tubman's brothers had second thoughts. Ben may have regretted leaving his wife and children. The two men went back, forcing Tubman to return with them.

Sometime in October or November, Tubman escaped again, this time without her brothers. Before leaving she sang a farewell song to hint at her intentions, which she hoped would be understood by Mary, a trusted fellow slave: "I'll meet you in the morning", she intoned, "I'm bound for the promised land." While her route is unknown, Tubman made use of the network known as the Underground Railroad. This informal system was composed of free and enslaved black people, white abolitionists, and other activists. Most prominent among the latter in Maryland at the time were Quakers. The Preston area near Poplar Neck contained a substantial Quaker community and was probably an important first stop during Tubman's escape. From there, she probably took a common route for people fleeing slavery – northeast along the Choptank River, through Delaware, and then north into Pennsylvania. A journey of nearly 90 miles (145 km) by foot would have taken between five days and three weeks.

Tubman had to travel by night, guided by the North Star and trying to avoid slave catchers eager to collect rewards for fugitive slaves. The "conductors" in the Underground Railroad used deceptions for protection. At an early stop, the lady of the house instructed Tubman to sweep the yard so as to seem to be working for the family. When night fell, the family hid her in a cart and took her to the next friendly house. Given her familiarity with the woods and marshes of the region, Tubman likely hid in these locales during the day. The particulars of her first journey are unknown; because other escapees from slavery used the routes, Tubman did not discuss them until later in life.

Some early accounts describe Tubman warning that those turning back could endanger the entire group, a tradition sometimes summarized as “go on or die” or “dead men tell no tales.” Modern scholarship has examined these stories cautiously, with historian Jonathan Chism arguing that they reflect the extreme conditions of escape and raise ethical questions about leadership and survival, while noting there is no evidence she killed anyone. She crossed into Pennsylvania with a feeling of relief and awe, and recalled the experience years later:

When I found I had crossed that line, I looked at my hands to see if I was the same person. There was such a glory over everything; the sun came like gold through the trees, and over the fields, and I felt like I was in Heaven.

== Nicknamed "Moses" ==
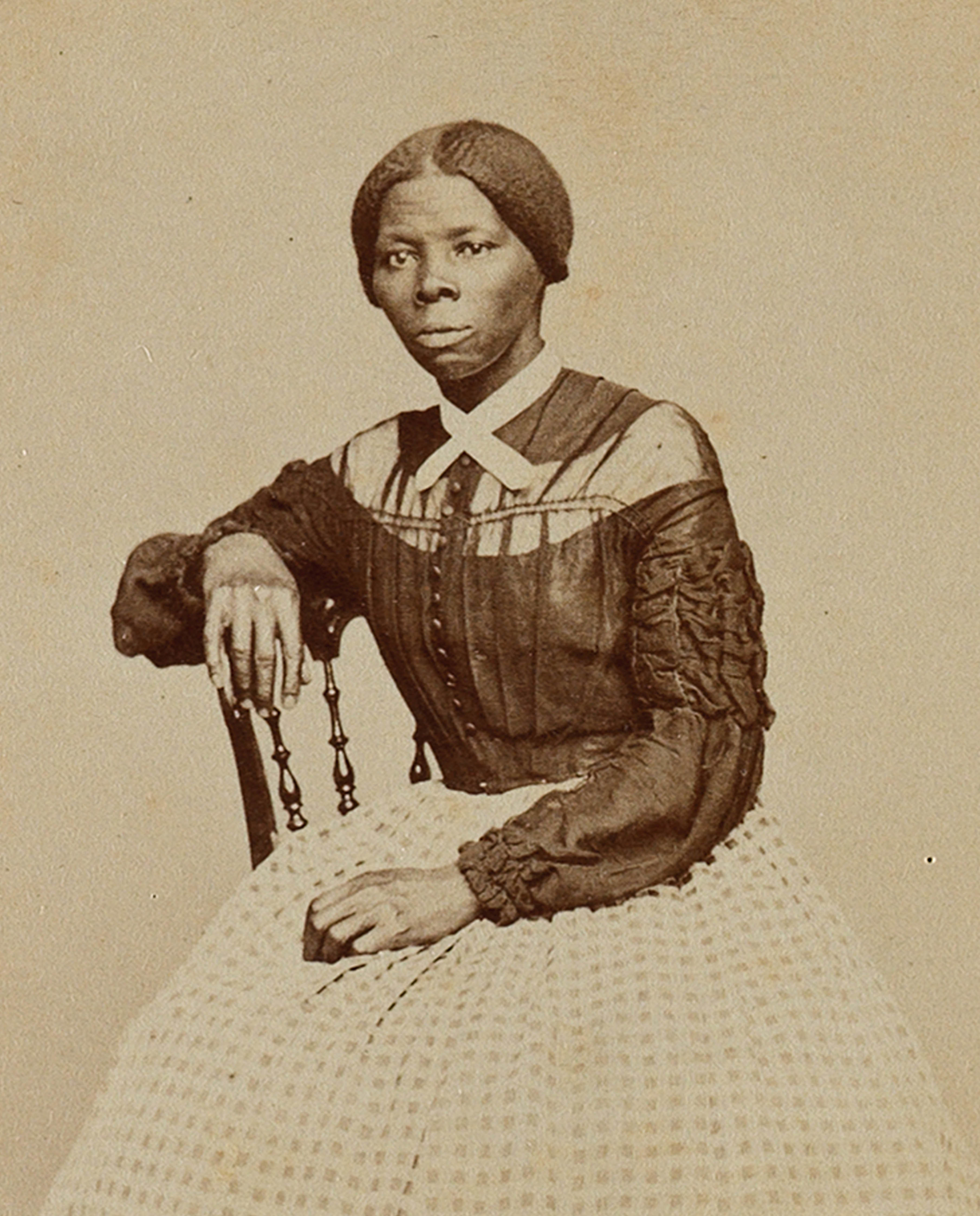
Tubman sitting, 1868 or 1869

After reaching Philadelphia, Tubman thought of her family. "I was a stranger in a strange land," she said later. "[M]y father, my mother, my brothers, and sisters, and friends were [in Maryland]. But I was free, and they should be free." While Tubman saved money from working odd jobs in Philadelphia and Cape May, New Jersey, the U.S. Congress passed the Fugitive Slave Act of 1850, which forced law enforcement officials to assist in the capture of escaped slaves – even in states that had outlawed slavery – and heavily punished abetting escape. The law increased risks for those who had escaped slavery, more of whom therefore sought refuge in Southern Ontario, where slavery had been abolished. (Note: The geographical area of Southern Ontario was part of the British province of Upper Canada when the province passed the 1793 Act Against Slavery, which banned importation of slaves and required that enslaved children born after passage of the act would be freed at age 25. The Slavery Abolition Act 1833 abolished slavery in most of the British Empire between 1834 and 1840. In 1841, the region was incorporated into the United Province of Canada.) Racial tensions were also increasing in Philadelphia as poor Irish immigrants competed with free blacks for work.

In December 1850, Tubman was warned that her niece Kessiah and Kessiah's children would soon be sold in Cambridge, Maryland. Tubman went to Baltimore, where her brother-in-law Tom Tubman hid her until the sale. Kessiah's husband, a free black man named John Bowley, made the winning bid for his wife. While the auctioneer stepped away to have lunch, John, Kessiah and their children escaped to a nearby safe house. When night fell, Bowley sailed the family on a log canoe 60 miles (97 km) to Baltimore, where they met with Tubman, who brought the family to Philadelphia.

Early next year she returned to Maryland to guide away other family members. During her second trip, she recovered her youngest brother, Moses, along with two other men. Word of her exploits had encouraged her family, and she became more confident with each trip to Maryland.

In late 1851, Tubman returned to Dorchester County for the first time since her escape, this time to find her husband John. When she arrived there, she learned that John had married another woman named Caroline. Tubman sent word that he should join her, but he insisted that he was happy where he was. Suppressing her anger, she found some enslaved people who wanted to escape and led them to Philadelphia. (Note: John and Caroline raised a family together, until he was killed 16 years later in a roadside argument with a white man named Robert Vincent.)

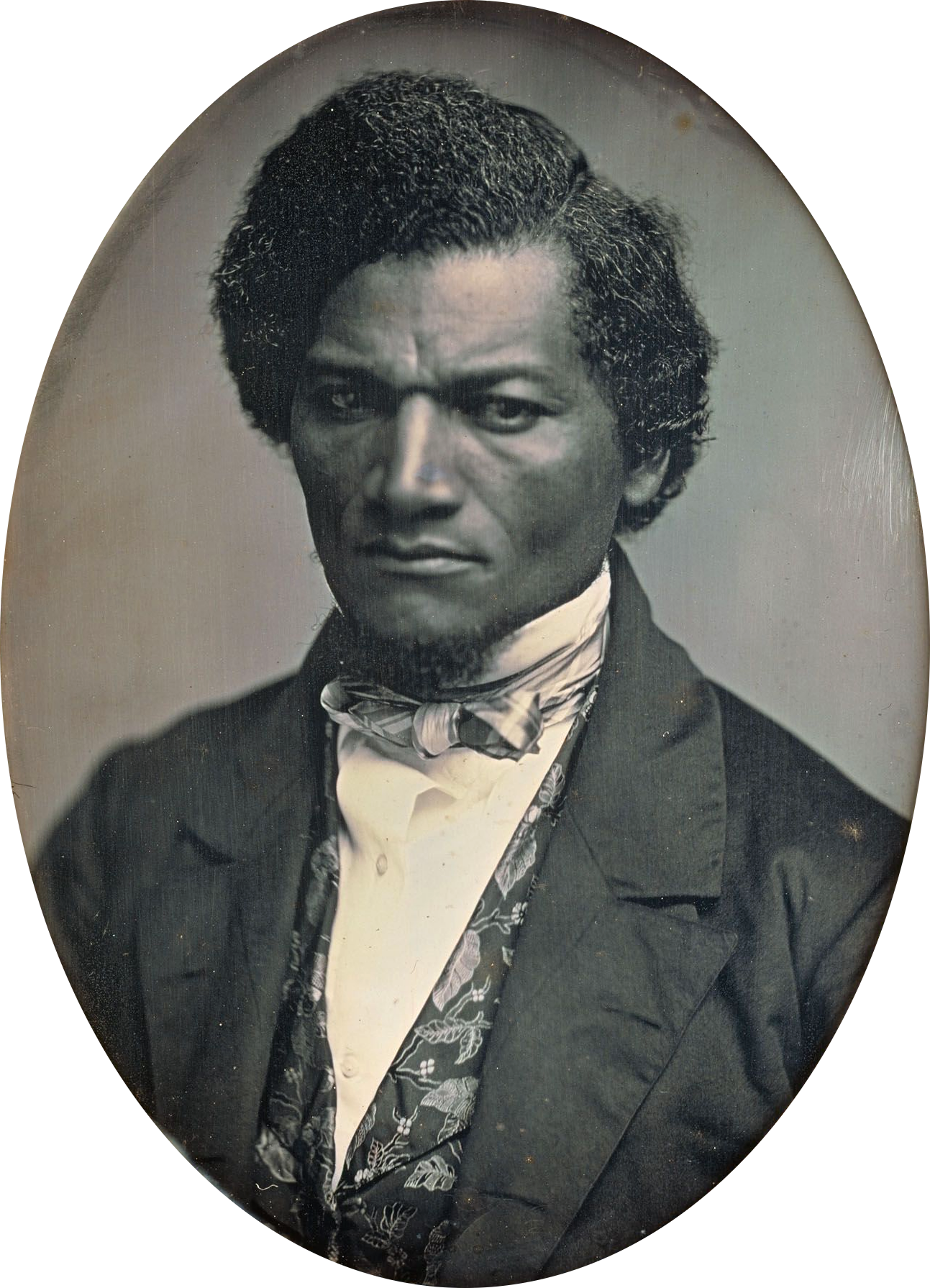
Frederick Douglass worked for slavery's abolition alongside Tubman.

In December 1851, Tubman guided an unidentified group of 11 escapees northward, possibly including the Bowleys and several others she had helped rescue earlier. There is evidence to suggest that Tubman and her group stopped at the home of abolitionist and former slave Frederick Douglass. Douglass and Tubman admired one another greatly as they both struggled against slavery. Years later he contrasted his efforts with hers, writing:

Most that I have done and suffered in the service of our cause has been in public, and I have received much encouragement at every step of the way. You, on the other hand, have labored in a private way. I have wrought in the day – you in the night. ... The midnight sky and the silent stars have been the witnesses of your devotion to freedom and of your heroism. Excepting John Brown – of sacred memory – I know of no one who has willingly encountered more perils and hardships to serve our enslaved people than you have.

From 1851 to 1862, Tubman returned repeatedly to the Eastern Shore of Maryland, rescuing some 70 enslaved people in about 13 expeditions, including her brothers Henry, Ben, and Robert, their wives and some of their children. She also provided specific instructions to 50 to 60 additional enslaved people who escaped. Because of her efforts, she was nicknamed "Moses", alluding to the biblical prophet who led the Hebrews to freedom from Egypt. One of her last missions into Maryland was to retrieve her aging parents. Her father purchased her mother from Eliza Brodess in 1855, but even when they were both free, the area was hostile. In 1857, Tubman received word that her father was at risk of arrest for harboring a group of eight people escaping slavery. She led her parents north to St. Catharines, Canada, where a community of formerly enslaved people, including other relatives and friends of Tubman, had gathered.

=== Routes and methods ===
Tubman's dangerous work required ingenuity. She usually worked during winter, when long nights and cold weather minimized the chance of being seen. She would start the escapes on Saturday evenings, since newspapers would not print runaway notices until Monday morning. She used subterfuges to avoid detection. Tubman once disguised herself with a bonnet and carried two live chickens to give the appearance of running errands. Suddenly finding herself walking toward a former enslaver, she yanked the strings holding the birds' legs, and their agitation allowed her to avoid eye contact. Later she recognized a fellow train passenger as a former enslaver; she snatched a nearby newspaper and pretended to read. Tubman was known to be illiterate, and the man ignored her.

In an 1897 interview with historian Wilbur Siebert, Tubman named some people who helped her and places she stayed along the Underground Railroad. She stayed with Sam Green, a free black minister living in East New Market, Maryland; she also hid near her parents' home at Poplar Neck. She would travel from there northeast to Sandtown and Willow Grove, Delaware, and to the Camden area where free black agents William and Nat Brinkley and Abraham Gibbs guided her north past Dover, Smyrna, and Blackbird, where other agents would take her across the Chesapeake and Delaware Canal to New Castle and Wilmington. In Wilmington, Quaker Thomas Garrett would secure transportation to William Still's office or the homes of other Underground Railroad operators in the greater Philadelphia area. Still is credited with helping hundreds escape to safer places in New York, New England, and Southern Ontario.

Tubman's faith was another important resource as she ventured repeatedly into Maryland. The visions from her childhood head injury continued, and she saw them as divine premonitions. She spoke of "consulting with God" and trusted that He would keep her safe. Garrett once said of her, "I never met with any person of any color who had more confidence in the voice of God, as spoken direct to her soul." Her faith also provided immediate assistance. She used spirituals as coded messages, warning fellow travelers of danger or to signal a clear path. She sang versions of "Go Down Moses" and changed the lyrics to indicate that it was either safe or too dangerous to proceed. As she led escapees across the border, she would call out, "Glory to God and Jesus, too. One more soul is safe!" In a dictated letter to a friend, she said, "God set the North Star in the heavens; He gave me the strength in my limbs; He meant I should be free."

She carried a revolver as protection from slave catchers and their dogs. Tubman threatened to shoot anyone who tried to turn back since that would risk the safety of the remaining group, as well as anyone who helped them on the way. Tubman spoke of one man who insisted he was going to go back to the plantation. She pointed the gun at his head and said, "Go on or die." Several days later, the man who wavered crossed into Canada with the rest of the group.

By the late 1850s, Eastern Shore slaveholders were holding public meetings about the large number of escapes in the area; they cast suspicion on free blacks and white abolitionists. They did not know that "Minty", the petite, disabled woman who had run away years before, was responsible for freeing so many enslaved people. Though a popular legend persists about a reward of $40,000 (equivalent to $1,433,000 in 2025) for Tubman's capture, this is a manufactured figure: in 1867, in support of Tubman's claim for a military pension, an abolitionist named Sallie Holley wrote that $40,000 "was not too great a reward for Maryland slaveholders to offer for her". If it were real, such a high reward would have garnered national attention. A reward of $12,000 has also been claimed, though no documentation has been found for either figure.

Tubman and the escapees she assisted were never captured. Years later, she told an audience: "I was conductor of the Underground Railroad for eight years, and I can say what most conductors can't say – I never ran my train off the track and I never lost a passenger."

== John Brown and Harpers Ferry ==
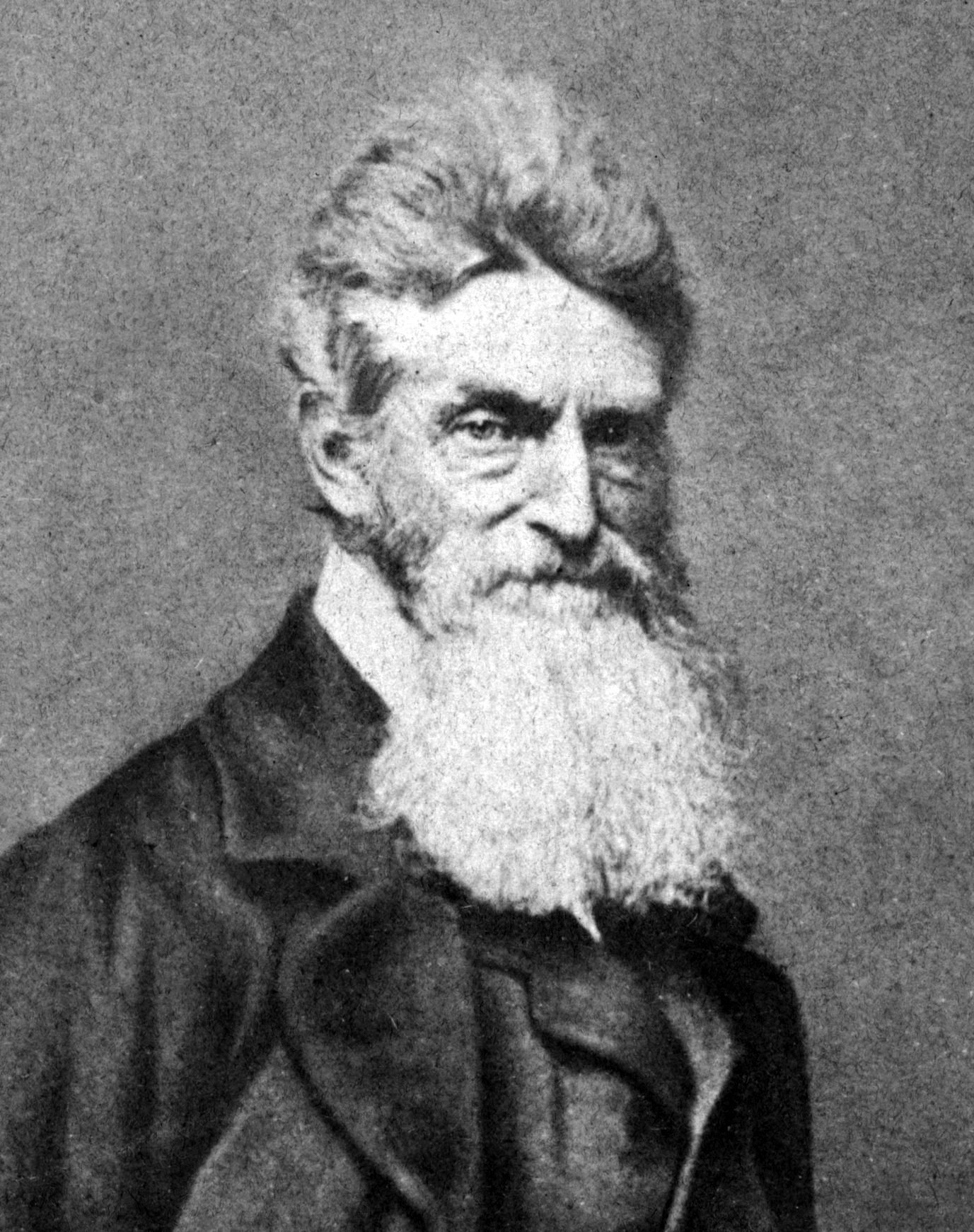
Tubman helped John Brown plan and recruit for the raid at Harpers Ferry.

In April 1858, Tubman was introduced to the abolitionist John Brown, an insurgent who advocated the use of violence to destroy slavery in the United States. Although she was not previously involved in armed insurrection, she agreed with his course of direct action and supported his goals. Like Tubman, he spoke of being called by God and trusted the divine to protect him from the wrath of slavers. She, meanwhile, claimed to have had a prophetic vision of meeting Brown before their encounter.

Thus, as he began recruiting supporters for an attack on enslavers, Brown was joined by "General Tubman", as he called her. Her knowledge of support networks and resources in the border states of Pennsylvania, Maryland and Delaware was invaluable to Brown and his planners. Although other abolitionists like Douglass did not endorse his tactics, Brown dreamed of fighting to create a new state for those freed from slavery and made preparations for military action. He believed that after he began the first battle, the enslaved would rise up and carry out a rebellion across the slave states. He asked Tubman to gather former slaves living in Southern Ontario who might be willing to join his fighting force, which she did.

On May 8, 1858, Brown held a meeting in Chatham, Canada, where he unveiled his plan for a raid on Harpers Ferry, Virginia. When word of the plan was leaked to the government, Brown put the scheme on hold and began raising funds for its eventual resumption. Tubman aided him in this effort and with more detailed plans for the assault.

Tubman was busy during this time, giving talks to abolitionist audiences and tending to her relatives. In early October 1859, as Brown and his men prepared to launch the attack, Tubman was ill in New Bedford, Massachusetts. It is not known whether she still intended to join Brown's raid or if she had become skeptical of the plan, but when the raid on Harpers Ferry took place on October 16, Tubman had recovered from her illness and was in New York City.

The raid failed; Brown was convicted of treason, murder, and inciting a rebellion, and he was hanged on December 2. His actions were seen by many abolitionists as a symbol of proud resistance, carried out by a noble martyr. Tubman was effusive with praise. She later told a friend, "[H]e done more in dying, than 100 men would in living."

== Auburn and Margaret ==
In early 1859, Frances Adeline Seward, the wife of abolitionist Republican U.S. Senator William H. Seward, sold Tubman a seven-acre (2.8 ha) farm in Fleming, New York, for $1,200 (equivalent to $46,400 in 2025). (Note: The property was an inheritance Frances received from her father, Elijah Miller. Under New York's Married Women's Property Act, she retained separate ownership from her husband, although he agreed with the sale. Because Tubman was a fugitive under federal law, the sale was illegal; the Sewards did not initially record the deed transfer and held the mortgage as a private loan.) The adjacent city of Auburn was a hotbed of antislavery activism, and Tubman took the opportunity to move her parents from Canada back to the U.S. Her farmstead became a haven for Tubman's family and friends. For years, she took in relatives and boarders, offering a safe place for black Americans seeking a better life in the north.

Shortly after acquiring the farm, Tubman went back to Maryland and returned with an eight-year-old light-skinned black girl named Margaret, who Tubman said was her niece. She also indicated the girl's parents were free blacks. According to Margaret's daughter Alice, Margaret later described her childhood home as prosperous and said that she left behind a twin brother. These descriptions conflict with what is known about the families of Tubman's siblings, which created uncertainty among historians about the relationship and Tubman's motivations. Alice called Tubman's actions a "kidnapping", saying, "she had taken the child from a sheltered good home to a place where there was nobody to care for her". After speculating in her 2004 biography of Tubman that Margaret might have been Tubman's own secret daughter, Larson found evidence that Margaret was the daughter of Isaac and Mary Woolford, a free black couple who were neighbors of Tubman's parents in Maryland and who had twins named James and Margaret.

In November 1860, Tubman conducted her last rescue mission. Throughout the 1850s, Tubman had been unable to effect the escape of her sister Rachel, and Rachel's two children Ben and Angerine. Upon returning to Dorchester County, Tubman discovered that Rachel had died, and the children could be rescued only if she could pay a bribe of $30 (equivalent to $1,070 in 2025). She did not have the money, so the children remained enslaved. Their fates remain unknown. Never one to waste a trip, Tubman gathered another group, including the Ennalls family, ready and willing to take the risks of the journey north. It took them weeks to get away safely because of slave catchers forcing them to hide out longer than expected. The weather was unseasonably cold, and they had little food. The Ennalls' infant child was quieted with paregoric while slave patrols rode by. They safely reached the home of David and Martha Wright in Auburn on December 28, 1860.

== American Civil War ==
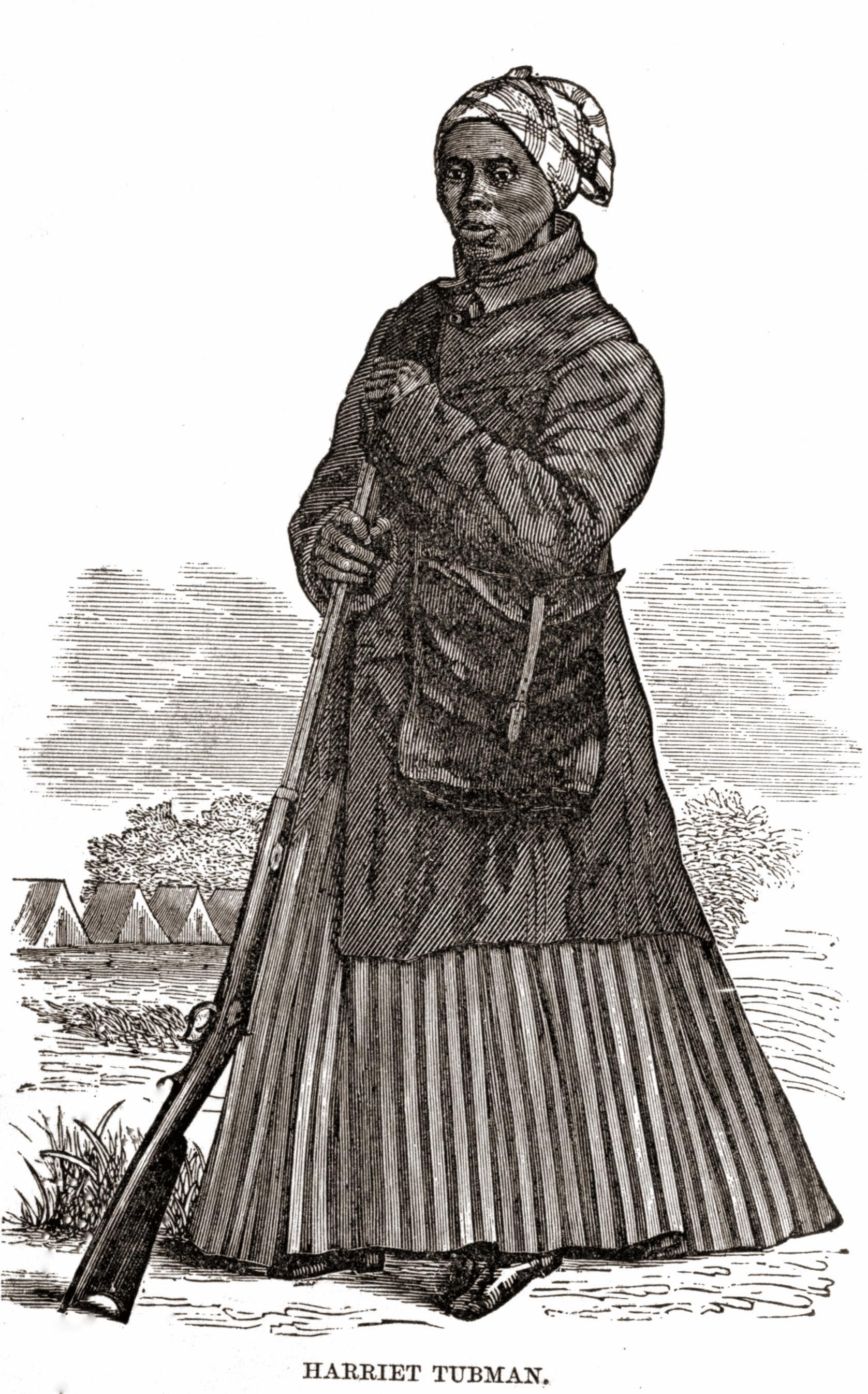
A woodcut of Tubman in her Civil War clothing

When the Civil War broke out in 1861, Tubman had a vision that the war would lead to the abolition of slavery. Enslaved people near Union positions began escaping in large numbers. At Fort Monroe in Virginia, Union army General Benjamin Butler declared these escapees to be "contraband" – property seized by northern forces – and put them to work, initially without pay. The number of "contrabands" encamped at Fort Monroe and other Union positions rapidly increased.

In January 1862, Tubman volunteered to support the Union cause and began helping refugees in the camps, particularly in Port Royal, South Carolina. There she met General David Hunter, a strong supporter of abolition. He declared all of the "contrabands" in the Port Royal district free and began gathering formerly enslaved people for a regiment of black soldiers. U.S. President Abraham Lincoln was not yet prepared to enforce emancipation on the southern states and reprimanded Hunter for his actions. Tubman condemned Lincoln's response and his general unwillingness to consider ending slavery in the U.S., for both moral and practical reasons:

God won't let master Lincoln beat the South till he does the right thing. Master Lincoln, he's a great man, and I am a poor negro; but the negro can tell master Lincoln how to save the money and the young men. He can do it by setting the negro free.

Tubman served as a nurse in Port Royal, preparing remedies from local plants and aiding soldiers suffering from dysentery and infectious diseases. At first, she received government rations for her work, but to dispel a perception that she was getting special treatment, she gave up her right to these supplies and made money selling pies and root beer, which she made in the evenings.

=== Scouting and the Combahee River Raid ===
When Lincoln issued the Emancipation Proclamation, Tubman considered it a positive but incomplete step toward the goal of liberating all black people from slavery. She turned her own efforts towards more direct actions to defeat the Confederacy. In early 1863, Tubman used her knowledge of covert travel and subterfuge to lead a band of scouts through the land around Port Royal. Her group, working under the orders of Secretary of War Edwin Stanton, mapped the unfamiliar terrain and reconnoitered its inhabitants. She later worked alongside Colonel James Montgomery and provided him with intelligence that aided in the temporary capture of Jacksonville, Florida, in March 1863.

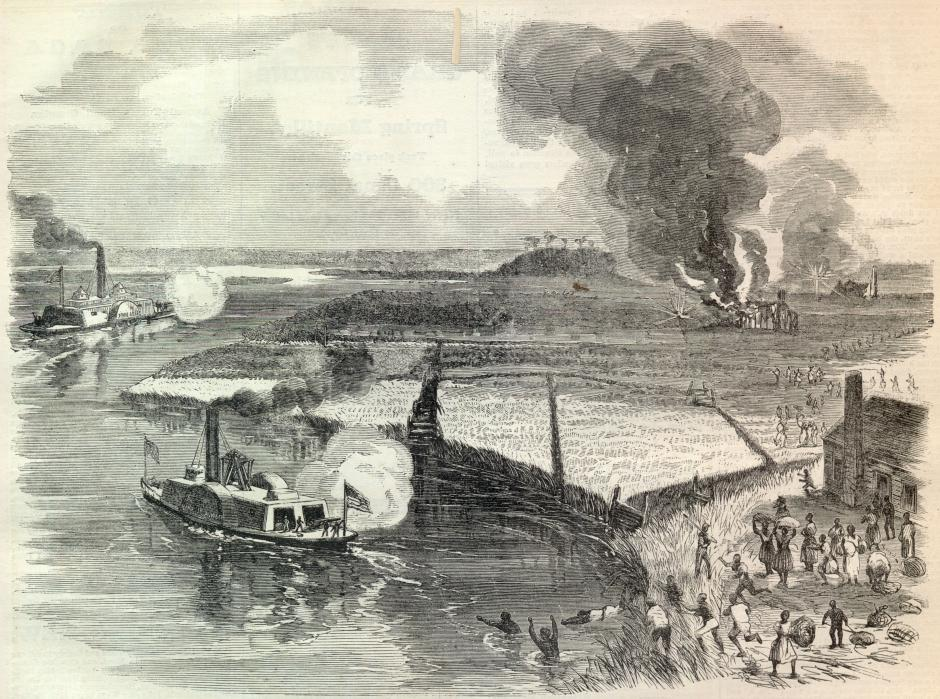
An illustration of the Combahee River Raid from Harper's Weekly

Later that year, Tubman's intelligence gathering played a key role in the raid on Combahee Ferry. She guided three steamboats with black soldiers under Montgomery's command past mines on the Combahee River to assault several plantations. Once ashore, the Union troops set fire to the plantations, destroying infrastructure and seizing thousands of dollars' worth of food and supplies. Forewarned of the raid by Tubman's spy network, enslaved people throughout the area heard steamboat whistles and understood that they were being liberated.

Tubman went ashore to assist them onto the boats, ruining her dress in the process, and she sang lyrics from "Uncle Sam's Farm" encouraging them to "come along, come along". She later described a scene of chaos with women carrying still-steaming pots of rice, pigs squealing in bags slung over shoulders, and babies hanging around their parents' necks. Armed overseers tried to stop the mass escape, but their efforts were nearly useless in the tumult. As Confederate troops raced to the scene, the steamboats took off toward Beaufort with more than 750 formerly enslaved people.

Newspapers heralded Tubman's "patriotism, sagacity, energy, [and] ability" in the raid, and she was praised for her recruiting efforts – more than 100 of the newly liberated men joined the Union army. Reports about her involvement in the raid led to a revival of the "General Tubman" appellation previously given to her by John Brown. Although her contributions have sometimes been exaggerated, (Note: Among the exaggerations are claims that she was an actual general and that Montgomery was under her command. Tubman held no official military rank and in her own account acknowledged "the brave Colonel Montgomery" for leading the operation, although she also wanted credit given to black scouts and troops in his regiment.) her role in the raid led to her being widely credited as the first woman to lead U.S. troops in an armed assault.

In July 1863, Tubman worked with Colonel Robert Gould Shaw at the assault on Fort Wagner, reportedly serving him his last meal. She later described the battle to historian Albert Bushnell Hart:

And then we saw the lightning, and that was the guns; and then we heard the thunder, and that was the big guns; and then we heard the rain falling, and that was the drops of blood falling; and when we came to get the crops, it was dead men that we reaped.

For two more years, Tubman worked for the Union forces, tending to newly liberated people, scouting into Confederate territory, and nursing wounded soldiers in Virginia, a task she continued for several months after the Confederacy surrendered in April 1865.

== Later life ==
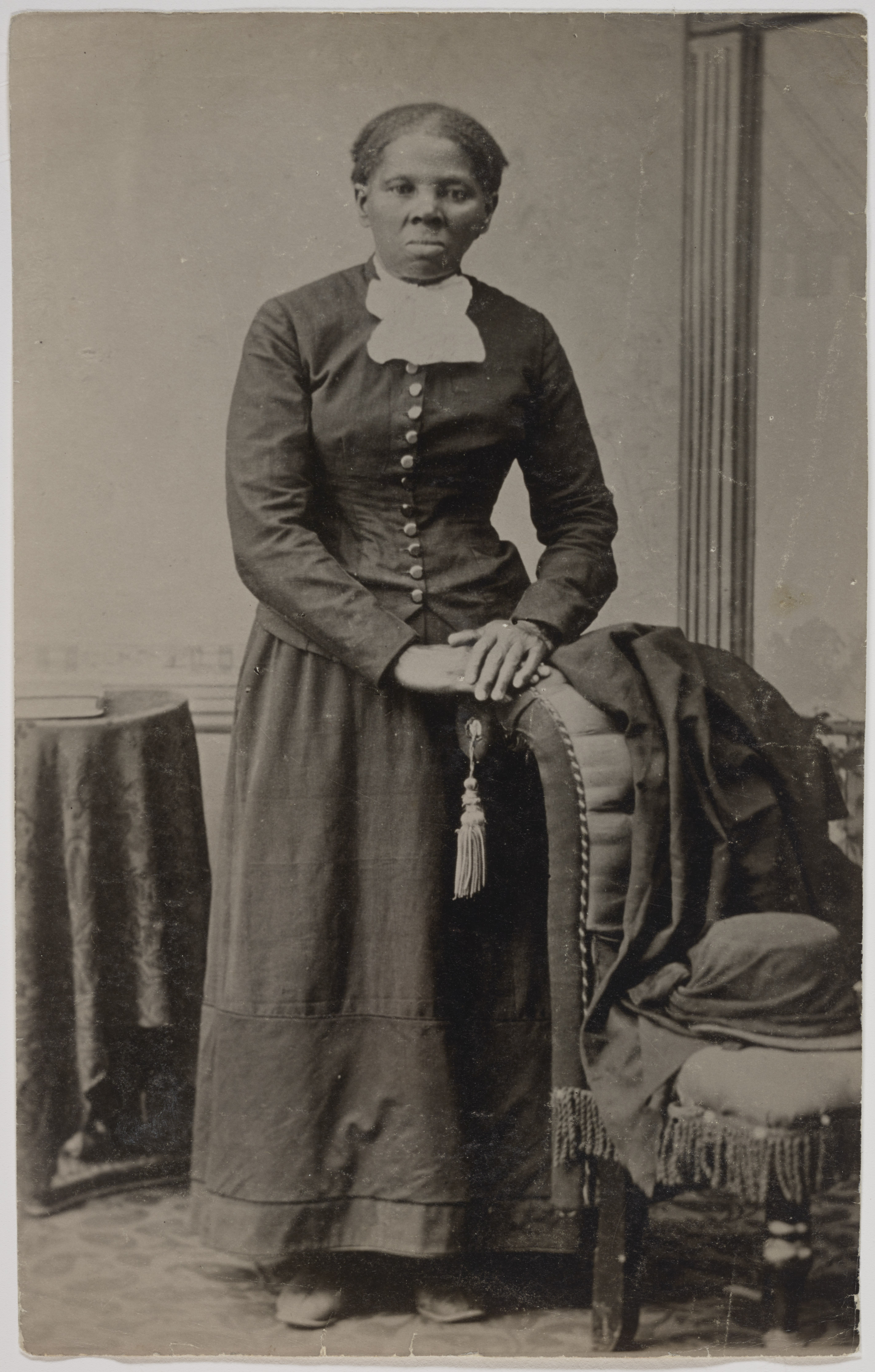
A formal portrait of Tubman taken after the Civil War and circulated as a carte de visite

Tubman had received little pay for her Union military service. She was not a regular soldier and was only occasionally compensated for her work as a spy and scout; her work as a nurse was entirely unpaid. For over three years of service, she received a total of $200 (equivalent to $4,210 in 2025). Her unofficial status caused great difficulty in documenting her service, and the U.S. government was slow to recognize any debt to her. Meanwhile, her humanitarian work for her family and the formerly enslaved kept her in a state of constant poverty.

When a promised appointment to an official military nursing position fell through in July 1865, Tubman decided to return to her home in New York. During a train ride to New York in October 1865, Tubman traveled on a half-fare ticket provided to her because of her service. A conductor told her to move from a regular passenger car into the less-desirable smoking car. When she refused, he cursed at her and grabbed her. She resisted, and he summoned additional men for help. They muscled her into the smoking car, injuring her in the process. As these events transpired, white passengers cursed Tubman and told the conductor to kick her off the train.

Tubman spent her remaining years in Auburn, tending to her family and other people in need. In addition to managing her farm, she took in boarders and worked various jobs to pay the bills and support her elderly parents. One of the people Tubman took in was a farmer named Nelson Davis. Born enslaved in North Carolina, he had served as a private in the 8th United States Colored Infantry Regiment from September 1863 to November 1865. He began working in Auburn as a bricklayer, and they soon fell in love. Though he was 22 years younger than she was, on March 18, 1869, they were married at the Central Presbyterian Church. They adopted a baby girl named Gertie in 1874.

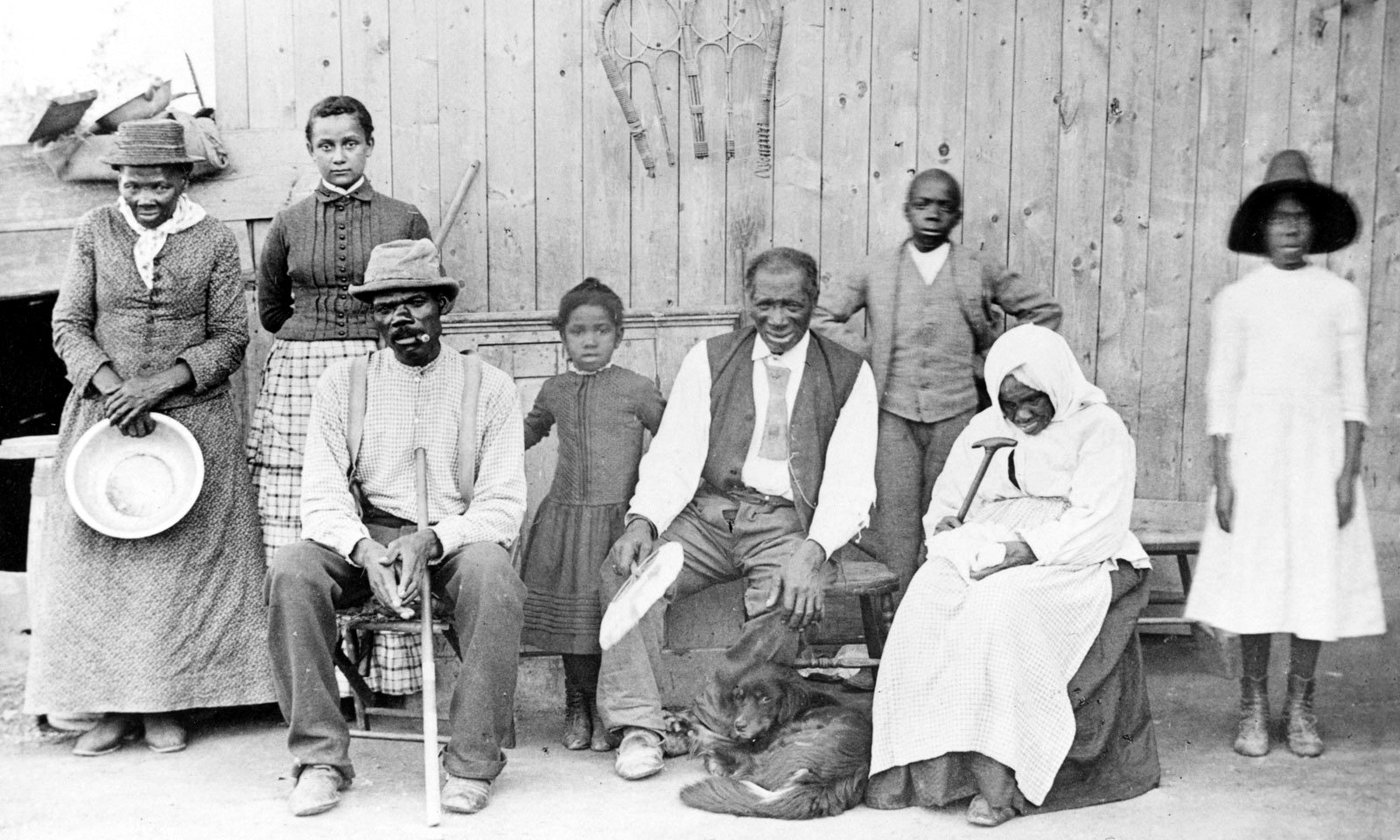
Tubman in 1887 (far left), with her husband Davis (seated, with cane), their adopted daughter Gertie (beside Tubman), Lee Cheney, John "Pop" Alexander, Walter Green, "Blind Aunty" Sarah Parker, and her great-niece Dora Stewart at Tubman's home in Auburn, New York

Tubman's friends and supporters from the days of abolition, meanwhile, raised funds to support her. One admirer, Sarah Hopkins Bradford, wrote an authorized biography entitled Scenes in the Life of Harriet Tubman. The 132-page volume was published in 1869 and brought Tubman some $1,200 in income (equivalent to $29,000 in 2025). Even with this assistance, paying off the mortgage on her farm in May 1873 exhausted Tubman's savings.

That October, she fell prey to swindlers. Two black men claimed to know a former slave who had a trunk of gold coins smuggled out of South Carolina, which they would sell for cash at less than half the coins' value. She knew white people in the South had buried valuables when Union forces threatened the region, and black men were frequently assigned to digging duties, so the claim seemed plausible to her. She borrowed money from a wealthy friend and arranged to receive the gold late one night. Once the men had lured her into the woods, they knocked her out with chloroform and stole her purse. Tubman was found dazed and injured; the trunk was filled with rocks.

The crime brought new attention from local leaders to Tubman's precarious financial state and spurred renewed efforts to get compensation for her Civil War service. In 1874, Representatives Clinton D. MacDougall of New York and Gerry W. Hazelton of Wisconsin introduced a bill to pay Tubman a $2,000 (equivalent to $56,900 in 2025) lump sum "for services rendered by her to the Union Army as scout, nurse, and spy", but it was defeated in the Senate. In February 1880, Tubman's wood-framed house burned down, but with the help of her supporters it was quickly replaced with a new brick home.

Nelson Davis died of tuberculosis on October 14, 1888. The Dependent and Disability Pension Act of 1890 made Tubman eligible for a pension as his widow. After she documented her marriage and her husband's service record to the satisfaction of the Bureau of Pensions, in 1895 Tubman was granted a monthly widow's pension of $8 (equivalent to $310 in 2025), plus a lump sum of $500 to cover the five-year delay in approval.

In December 1897, New York Congressman Sereno E. Payne introduced a bill to grant Tubman a soldier's monthly pension of $25 (equivalent to $970 in 2025). Although Congress received documents and letters to support Tubman's claims, some members objected to a woman being paid a full soldier's pension. In February 1899, Congress approved a compromise amount of $20 (equivalent to $770 in 2025) per month (the $8 from her widow's pension plus $12 for her service as a nurse) but did not acknowledge her as a scout and spy. (Note: In 2003, Congress approved a payment of $11,750 of additional pension to compensate for the perceived deficiency of the payments made during her life. The funds were directed to the maintenance of relevant historical sites.)

=== Suffragist activism ===
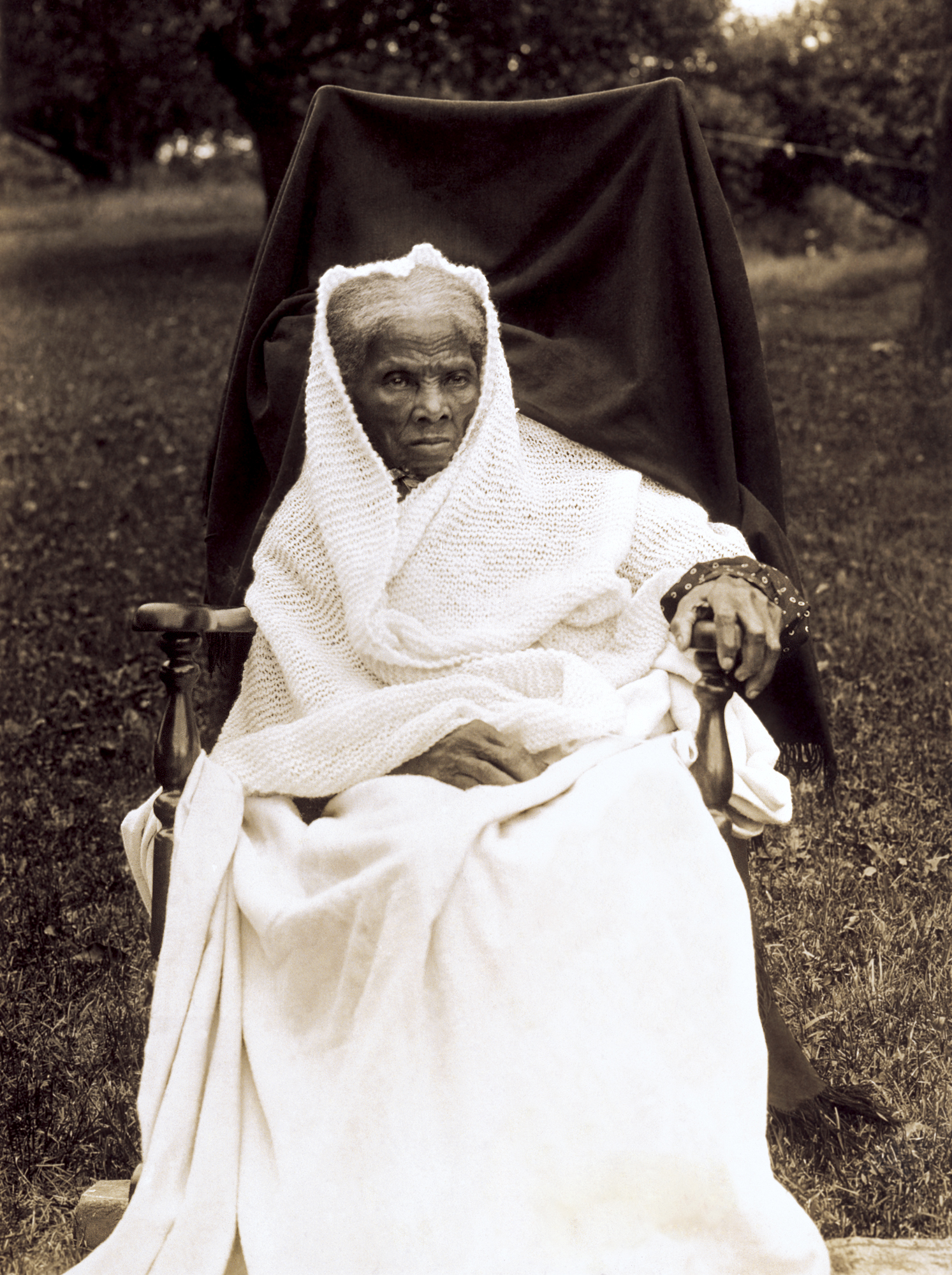
Tubman in 1911

In her later years, Tubman worked to promote the cause of women's suffrage. A white woman once asked Tubman whether she believed women ought to have the vote and received the reply: "I suffered enough to believe it." Tubman began attending meetings of suffragist organizations and worked alongside women such as Susan B. Anthony and Emily Howland.

Tubman traveled to New York, Boston and Washington, D.C., to speak in favor of women's voting rights. She described her actions during and after the Civil War and used the sacrifices of countless women throughout modern history as evidence of women's equality to men. When the National Federation of Afro-American Women was founded, Tubman was the keynote speaker at its first conference in 1896. When the federation was merged into the National Association of Colored Women, Tubman attended that organization's second conference in 1899.

This wave of activism kindled a new wave of admiration for Tubman among the press in the United States. A publication called The Woman's Era launched a series of articles on "Eminent Women" with a profile of Tubman. An 1897 suffragist newspaper reported a series of receptions in Boston honoring Tubman and her lifetime of service to the nation. However, her endless contributions to others had left her in poverty, and she had to sell a cow to buy a train ticket to these celebrations.

=== Church, illness, and death ===
In the 1870s, Tubman became active in the Thompson Memorial African Methodist Episcopal (AME) Zion Church in Auburn. In 1895, she began discussions with AME Zion leaders and others to create a Harriet Tubman Home for the Aged that would care for "indigent colored people". Despite her financial limitations, in 1896 Tubman bid $1,215 (equivalent to $47,000 in 2025) at auction for a 25-acre (10 ha) farm adjacent to the one she already owned, to use for the new facility. She designated one of the farm's buildings as its primary residence and named it "John Brown Hall" to honor her late abolitionist ally. Raising funds for the project was difficult, and attempts to donate the property were complicated by the multiple mortgages used to pay for it. After Tubman almost lost the property because of her financial difficulties, AME Zion agreed to take it over in 1903.

The home did not open for another five years, and Tubman was dismayed when the church ordered residents to pay a $100 entrance fee (equivalent to $3,580 in 2025). She said: "[T]hey make a rule that nobody should come in without they have a hundred dollars. Now I wanted to make a rule that nobody should come in unless they didn't have no money at all." She was frustrated by the rule but was the guest of honor nonetheless when the home celebrated its opening on June 23, 1908.

As Tubman aged, her childhood head trauma continued to trouble her. Unable to sleep because of pain and "buzzing" in her head, in the late 1890s she asked a doctor at Boston's Massachusetts General Hospital to operate. In her words, he "sawed open my skull, and raised it up, and now it feels more comfortable". She reportedly received no anesthesia and instead bit down on a bullet, as she had seen Civil War soldiers do when their limbs were amputated.

By 1911, Tubman's body was so frail that she was admitted into the rest home named in her honor. A New York newspaper described her as "ill and penniless", prompting supporters to offer a new round of donations. Surrounded by friends and family members, she died of pneumonia on March 10, 1913. Just before she died, she quoted the Gospel of John to those in the room: "I go away to prepare a place for you." Tubman was buried with semi-military honors at Fort Hill Cemetery in Auburn.

== Legacy ==
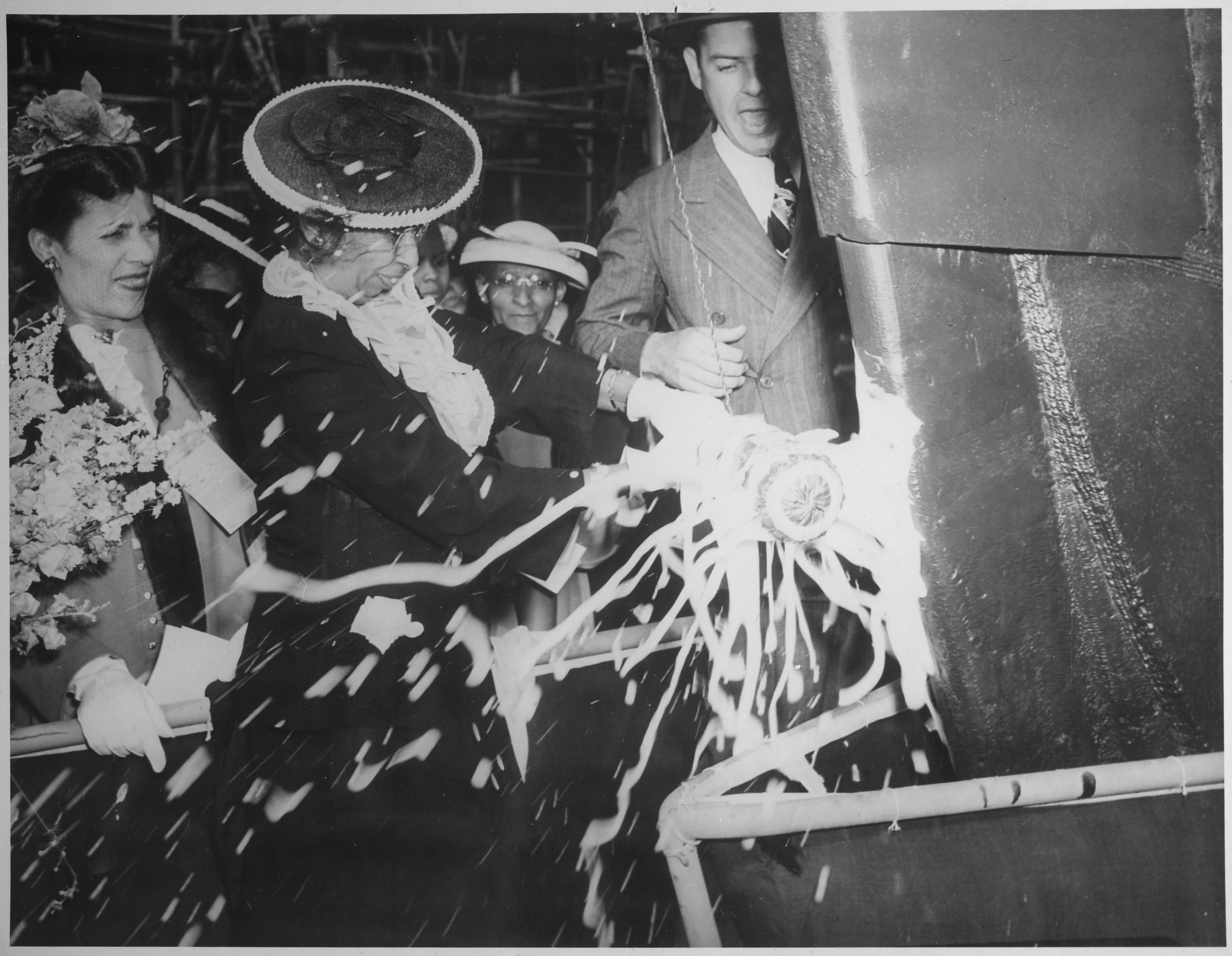
Tubman's great-niece, Eva Stewart Northrup, launching the SS Harriet Tubman

Widely known and well-respected while she was alive, Tubman became an American icon in the years after she died. By the 1980s, Tubman had become one of American history's most famous figures. She inspired generations of African Americans struggling for equality and civil rights, and was praised by leaders across the political spectrum.

=== Parks, monuments, and historical sites ===
National parks and national monuments related to Tubman in the United States are the Harriet Tubman Underground Railroad National Monument and the Harriet Tubman Underground Railroad National Historical Park, both in Maryland, and the Harriet Tubman National Historical Park in Auburn, NY.

The Salem Chapel in St. Catharines, Canada where Tubman worshipped, is a National Historic Site of Canada. The government of Canada designated Tubman as a National Historic Person after the Canadian Historic Sites and Monuments Board recommended it in 2005.

Auburn, New York, has several historical sites related to Tubman, including her gravesite. Other state and local historical sites about Tubman include the Harriet Tubman Underground Railroad State Park and the Harriet Tubman Memorial Garden in Maryland, and the Harriet Tubman Museum is in New Jersey.

=== Artistic portrayals ===
Tubman is the subject of many works of art. Musicians including Woody Guthrie, Wynton Marsalis, and Walter Robinson have written songs celebrating her. She is the subject of operas by Thea Musgrave, Nkeiru Okoye, and Hilda Paredes, as well as plays by Carolyn Gage and a collaboration of May Miller and Willis Richardson. Tubman is the focus of novels by Elizabeth Cobbs, Marcy Heidish, Anne Parrish, and Bob the Drag Queen, and is a character in novels by Terry Bisson, Ta-Nehisi Coates, and James McBride.

Since Tubman's life was first dramatized on television in a 1963 episode of the series The Great Adventure, she has been portrayed in TV productions such as The Good Lord Bird, Timeless, Underground, and A Woman Called Moses. Cynthia Erivo received an Academy Award nomination for portraying Tubman in the 2019 biographical film Harriet.

Artists including Fern Cunningham, Jane DeDecker, Nina Cooke John, and Alison Saar have presented Tubman in sculptures. The first statue of Tubman in the region where she was born was unveiled in Salisbury, Maryland, in 2009. She has been drawn or painted by numerous artists, including Romare Bearden, Aaron Douglas, William Johnson, Jacob Lawrence, and Faith Ringgold.

=== Other honors and commemorations ===
Harriet Tubman, 1978 issue The 13-cent Harriet Tubman issue was the first in the Black Heritage series of postage stamps, initiated by the USPS in 1978.

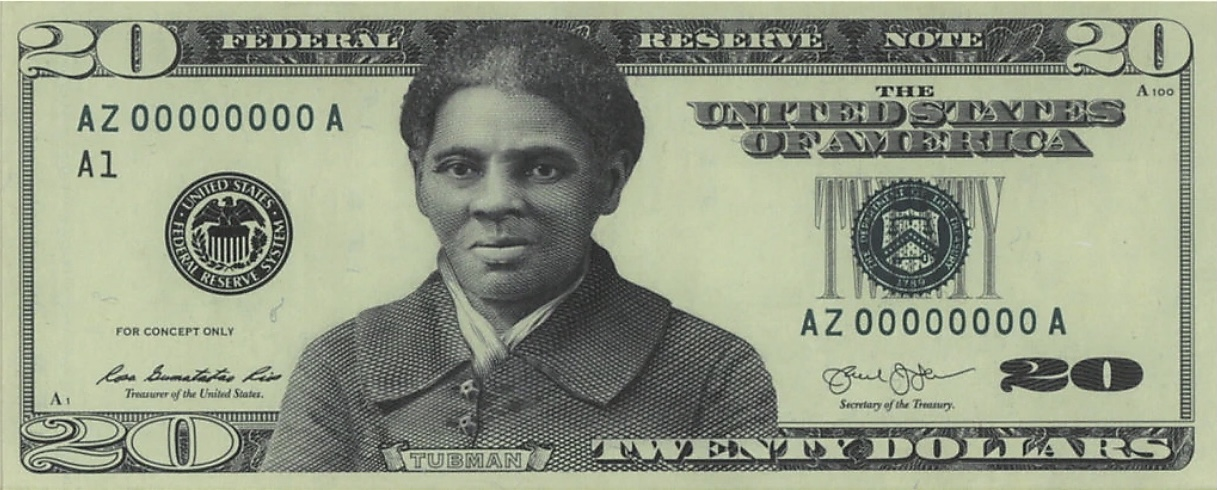
A planned $20 bill design from 2018

In 1978, Tubman became the first African-American woman honored on a U.S. postage stamp; she appeared on a second stamp in 1995. Starting in 2016, there were plans to add a portrait of Tubman to the front of the twenty-dollar bill, moving the portrait of President Andrew Jackson, a slaveholder, to the back of the bill. Scott Bessent, the U.S. secretary of the treasury, stated in a July 2026 interview that the placement of Tubman's portrait on the bill is no longer planned. In 2024, the United States Mint issued three Harriet Tubman commemorative coins; each coin depicts her at a different stage of her life.

Dozens of schools, streets and highways, church groups, social organizations, and government agencies have been named after Tubman. In 1944, the United States Maritime Commission launched the SS Harriet Tubman, its first Liberty ship named for a black woman. On November 11, 2024, Tubman was posthumously commissioned as a one-star general (brigadier general) in the Maryland Army National Guard in recognition of her military service during the Civil War.

== Historiography ==
Tubman hoped to become literate and write her own memoirs, but she never did. Instead, she authorized Sarah Hopkins Bradford to combine Tubman's personal recollections, journalistic accounts, and letters from Tubman's friends and supporters to create Scenes in the Life of Harriet Tubman in 1868. (Note: Although its official publication date was 1869, copies of the book were available in December 1868.) Criticized by modern biographers for its artistic license and highly subjective point of view, the book nevertheless provides insight into Tubman's own view of her experiences.

In 1886, at Tubman's request, Bradford released a re-written volume called Harriet, the Moses of her People. In both volumes Harriet Tubman is hailed as a latter-day Joan of Arc. The revision took a more moralistic and literary tone than the prior work, changed of many event descriptions from first to third person, and rearranged depictions of events in chronological order. A final revision in 1901 added an appendix with more stories about Tubman's life.

The first full biography of Tubman to be published after Bradford's was Earl Conrad's Harriet Tubman (1943). Conrad experienced great difficulty in finding a publisher – the search took four years – and endured disdain and contempt for his efforts to construct a more objective, detailed account of Tubman's life for adults. Several highly dramatized versions of Tubman's life had been written for children, and many more came later, but Conrad wrote in an academic style.

Though she was a popular historical figure, another book-length biography based on original scholarship did not appear for 60 years, when Jean Humez published a close reading of Tubman's life stories in 2003. Kate Clifford Larson and Catherine Clinton both published their biographies soon after in 2004. Historian Milton Sernett's 2007 book Harriet Tubman: Myth, Memory, and History discusses the major biographies of Tubman up to that time. In 2024, historian Edda L. Fields-Black published Combee: Harriet Tubman, the Combahee River Raid, and Black Freedom During the Civil War, which shed new light on Tubman's military service and was awarded the Pulitzer Prize for History.

== See also ==
- Ida B. Wells – American journalist and civil rights activist (1862–1931)
- List of slaves
- List of suffragists and suffragettes – People who campaigned for women's right to vote
- Richard Amos Ball – Canadian Methodist minister
- Tilly Escape – Slave escape aided by Harriet Tubman

== Sources ==
- André, Naomi (2018). Black Opera: History, Power, Engagement. Urbana, Illinois: University of Illinois Press. ISBN 978-0-252-08357-0.
- Armstrong, Douglas V. (2022). The Archaeology of Harriet Tubman's Life in Freedom. Syracuse, New York: Syracuse University Press. ISBN 978-0-8156-5523-7.
- Cep, Casey (June 24, 2024). "The Radical Faith of Harriet Tubman". The New Yorker.
- Clinton, Catherine (2004). Harriet Tubman: The Road to Freedom. New York: Little, Brown and Company. ISBN 978-0-316-14492-6 – via Open Library.
- "Consumer Price Index (estimate) 1800–". Federal Reserve Bank of Minneapolis.
- Dunbar, Erica Armstrong (2019). She Came to Slay: The Life and Times of Harriet Tubman (Kindle ed.). New York: Simon & Schuster. ISBN 978-1-982139-66-7.
- Duster, Chandelis (January 9, 2024). "US Mint Releases Coins Honoring Harriet Tubman". CNN. Archived from the original on January 10, 2024.
- Fields-Black, Edda L. (2024). Combee: Harriet Tubman, the Combahee River Raid, and Black Freedom During the Civil War. New York: Oxford University Press. ISBN 978-0-19-755279-7.
- Franklin, Jonathan (March 13, 2023). "A Monument of Harriet Tubman Now Replaces a Statue of Christopher Columbus in Newark". NPR. Archived from the original on June 15, 2023.
- Gaige, Amity (August 23, 2013). "The Good Lord Bird, by James McBride". San Francisco Chronicle. Archived from the original on July 25, 2019.
- Gibson, Chantal N. & Silverman, Monique (2005). "Sur/Rendering Her Image: The Unknowable Harriet Tubman". RACAR: Revue d'art canadienne / Canadian Art Review. 30 (1–2): 25–38. doi:10.7202/1069660ar. JSTOR 42630711.
- Grigg, Jeff W. (2014). The Combahee River Raid: Harriet Tubman & Lowcountry Liberation (Kindle ed.). Charleston, South Carolina: The History Press. ISBN 978-1-62585-004-1.
- Hobson, Janell (2022). When God Lost Her Tongue: Historical Consciousness and the Black Feminist Imagination. Subversive Histories, Feminist Futures series. New York: Routledge. doi:10.4324/9780429243554. ISBN 978-0-429-24355-4.
- Humez, Jean M. (Summer 1993). "In Search of Harriet Tubman's Spiritual Autobiography". NWSA Journal. 5 (2): 162–182. JSTOR 4316258.
- Humez, Jean (2003). Harriet Tubman: The Life and Life Stories. Madison: University of Wisconsin Press. ISBN 978-0-299-19120-7 – via Open Library.
- Kaufman, Rachel (May 13, 2018). "Pilot, Thinker, Soldier, Spy: The Epic Timeless Season Finale Twofer". Smithsonian Magazine. Archived from the original on October 17, 2020.
- Knauer, Caron (2023). American Slavery on Film. Hollywood History series. Santa Barbara: ABC-CLIO. ISBN 978-1-4408-7752-0.
- Larson, Kate Clifford (2004). Bound For the Promised Land: Harriet Tubman, Portrait of an American Hero. New York: Ballantine Books. ISBN 978-0-345-45627-4 – via Open Library.
- Larson, Kate Clifford (2022). Harriet Tubman: A Reference Guide to Her Life and Works. Significant Figures in World History series (Kindle ed.). Lanham, Maryland: Rowman & Littlefield. ISBN 978-1-5381-1357-8.
- Lockman, JT Moodee (November 11, 2024). "Maryland Posthumously Promotes Harriet Tubman to One-star General to Honor Her Military Service". CBS News. Archived from the original on November 12, 2024.
- Lusane, Clarence (2022). Twenty Dollars and Change: Harriet Tubman and the Ongoing Fight for Racial Justice and Democracy (Kindle ed.). San Francisco: City Lights Books. ISBN 978-0-87286-859-5.
- Miles, Tiya (2024). Night Flyer: Harriet Tubman and the Faith Dreams of a Free People. Penguin Press. ISBN 978-0593491164.
- Oertel, Kristen T. (2015). Harriet Tubman: Slavery, the Civil War, and Civil Rights in the Nineteenth-century America. Routledge Historical Americans series. London: Routledge. ISBN 978-1-135-94897-9.
- Portelli, Alessandro (1988). "Review of Fire on the Mountain". Appalachian Journal. 16 (1): 87–90. JSTOR 40933404.
- Roma, Catherine (2001). "Contemporary British Composers". In Pendle, Karin (ed.). Women and Music: A History. Bloomington: Indiana University Press. pp. 227–251. ISBN 978-0-253-11503-4 – via Open Library.
- Rosenberg, Amy S. (September 17, 2020). "The Harriet Tubman Museum in Cape May Marked Its Opening. Here's What's Inside, and Why It's in Cape May". The Philadelphia Inquirer. Archived from the original on September 21, 2020.
- Sacks, Sam (May 17, 2019). "Fiction: Tales of History and Imagination". Books & Arts in Review. The Wall Street Journal. Archived from the original on July 25, 2019.
- Sernett, Milton C. (2007). Harriet Tubman: Myth, Memory, and History. Durham and London: Duke University Press. ISBN 978-0-8223-4073-7.
- Vargas, Ángel (October 17, 2018). "La gesta de Harriet Tubman llega al Cervantino en forma de ópera" [The deeds of Harriet Tubman arrive at the Cervantino in the form of an opera]. La Jornada (in Spanish). Archived from the original on April 17, 2021.
- Walters, Kerry (2020). Harriet Tubman: A Life in American History. Black History Lives series (Kindle ed.). Santa Barbara: ABC-CLIO. ISBN 978-1-4408-5569-6.
- Ward, Jasper & Lawder, David (July 7, 2026). "Trump Administration Puts Plan for Harriet Tubman $20 Bill on Ice". Reuters.
- Wickenden, Dorothy (2021). The Agitators: Three Friends Who Fought for Abolition and Women's Rights (Kindle ed.). New York: Scribner. ISBN 978-1-4767-6076-6.
- Williams, Lesley (March 2025). "Harriet Tubman: Live in Concert (review)". Kirkus Reviews. Vol. 93, no. 5. ProQuest 3170738038.
