= Sarah Hopkins Bradford =

American writer and biographer (1818–1912)

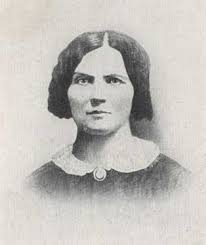
- Portrait of Sarah Hopkins Bradford
- Born: August 20, 1818; Mount Morris, New York
- Died: June 25, 1912 (aged 93)
- Occupations: Writer and historian
- Spouse: John Melancthon Bradford Jr. (m. 1839; death 1860)
- Children: 6
- Relatives: Samuel Miles Hopkins (father); Arent Schuyler Crowninshield (son-in-law)
- Writing career
- Pen name: Cousin Cicely
- Notable work: Harriet, the Moses of Her People

Sarah Hopkins Bradford (August 20, 1818 – June 25, 1912) was an American writer and historian, best known today for her two pioneering biographical books on Harriet Tubman. Most of her work consists of children's literature, some published under the name Cousin Cicely.

== Biography ==
=== Early life and family ===
Sarah Elizabeth Hopkins was born on August 20, 1818, in Mount Morris, New York. She was the youngest of seven children of the Hon. Samuel Miles Hopkins (1772–1837) and Sarah Elizabeth Rogers (1778–1866). Her father was a Yale University graduate, attorney and judge, who served as a Federalist Party congressman (1813–1815), New York State Assemblyman (1820–1821), and New York State Senate member (1822). On May 15, 1839, she married prominent Albany, New York attorney (later judge) John Melancthon Bradford Jr. (1813–1860). The couple had six children: Charles, William, Mary, John, Elizabeth and Louisa. Their two eldest sons were killed in the Civil War. Their daughter, Mary, (1844–1913) later became a well-known writer in her own right under the name Mary Bradford Crowninshield; her husband, Arent Schuyler Crowninshield, was a naval officer who advanced to Rear Admiral rank, and eventually headed the Bureau of Navigation.

=== Children's literature ===
Bradford wrote her first published work, Amy, the Glass-Blower's Daughter: A True Narrative in 1847. She then wrote the six-volume Silver Lake Series, published from 1852 to 1854. Rather than a formal series involving connected characters, these six books are each collections of poetry and prose, including many short stories. Bradford wrote these books under the pen name 'Cousin Cicely'. Most of her early writing, up until the late 1860s, targeted the children's market, and she published at least seven further children's books, including both fiction and history. She also wrote articles published in magazines.

Following her husband's death in 1860, she opened a seminary for girls and young women in Geneva, New York. She moved to Europe for eight years, where she educated her daughters.

=== Harriet Tubman works ===
In 1869, four years after the end of the Civil War, Bradford wrote her first of two groundbreaking books, Scenes in the Life of Harriet Tubman. Tubman escaped slavery and then returned to help many others escape as well, traveling to the northern United States and Canada before the Civil War, using the Underground Railroad. Bradford wrote the book, using extensive interviews with Tubman, to raise funds for Tubman's support. The two became friends. It was the first Tubman biography of any depth. Bradford was one of the first white writers to deal with African-American topics, and her work attracted worldwide fame, selling very well. In 1886, she followed up with Harriet, the Moses of Her People, again to assist in supporting Tubman. A final revision in 1901 added an appendix with more stories about Tubman's life. Both works have been published in many editions, and still sell well in the early 21st century.

=== Later life and death ===
Bradford lived in Geneva, New York, and late in her life settled in Rochester, New York. She died there June 25, 1912.

== Legacy ==
Bradford was one of the first American women writers to specialize in children's literature, predating better-known writers such as Louisa May Alcott. She was a contemporary of Harriet Beecher Stowe, whose breakthrough novel Uncle Tom's Cabin also featured African-American themes, but appeared some 20 years before Bradford's first Tubman biography. Much of Bradford's children's literature is still available in modern times, either online, or in through photographed copies of original volumes, reissued by modern publishers. Her Tubman books, which received some criticism based on lack of thoroughness in historical methods, remain popular, and have been issued in some twenty editions, as of 2012.

== Major works ==
=== Children's literature ===
- Amy, the Glass-Blower's Daughter: A True Narrative, 1847, published by American Sunday-School Union, Philadelphia
- Silver Lake Series (six volumes), from 1852 to 1854, published by Alden, Beardsley & Co., Auburn, New York, and some also published by Wanzer, Beardsley, Rochester, New York
  - The Budget: A Collection of Pieces in Prose and Rhyme
  - The Jumble: A Collection of Pieces in Prose and Rhyme
  - The Old Portfolio: A Collection of Pieces in Prose and Rhyme
  - Green Satchel: A Collection of Pieces in Prose and Rhyme
  - Ups and Downs: Or, Silver Lake Sketches
  - Aunt Patty's Mirror: A Collection of Pieces in Prose and Rhyme
- Lewie; Or, The Bended Twig, 1854, published by J.C. Derby
- The Linton Family, Or, The Fashion of this World, 1860
- Getting Well: Tales for Little Convalescents, 1866
- Grandmamma's Search, 1870, published by New Editions, London

=== History and biography ===
- The History of Peter the Great, Czar of Russia, 1858, published by D. Appleton & Co., New York
- The Story of Columbus: Simplified for the Young Folks, 1862
- History and Directory of Geneva, New York, 1862
- The Chosen People, 1863
- Scenes in the Life of Harriet Tubman, 1869, published by W.J. Moses, Auburn, New York
- Harriet, the Moses of Her People, 1886, published by George R. Lockwood & Son, New York
