= Arent S. Crowninshield =

United States Navy admiral (1843–1908)

Arent Schuyler Crowninshield
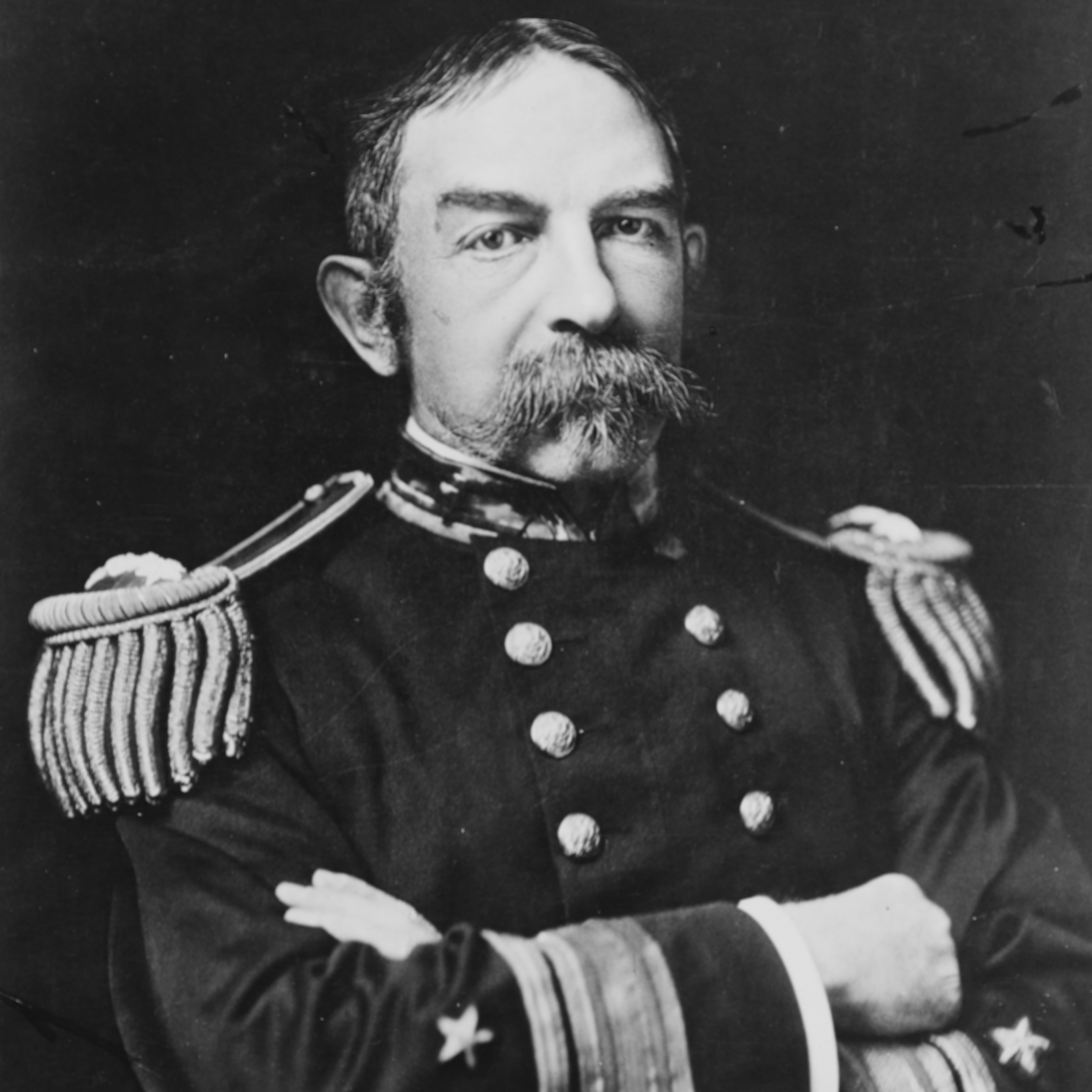
- Born: March 14, 1843; New York, US
- Died: May 14, 1908 (aged 65); Philadelphia, Pennsylvania, US
- Burial place: Arlington National Cemetery
- Relatives: Crowninshield family
- Military career
- Allegiance: United States
- Branch: United States Navy
- Service years: 1863–1902
- Rank: Rear admiral
- Commands: Portsmouth; St. Mary's; Kearsarge; Maine
- Conflicts: American Civil War; Spanish–American War

Arent Schuyler Crowninshield (March 14, 1843 – May 27, 1908) was an American rear admiral of the United States Navy. He saw combat during the Civil War, and after the war held high commands both afloat and ashore.

== Early life ==
Born in New York, he was the grandson of Jacob Crowninshield (appointed Navy secretary under President Jefferson, but who died before taking up the office), and grandnephew of George Crowninshield Jr. (adventuring owner of Cleopatra's Barge, first yacht to cross the Atlantic) and Benjamin Williams Crowninshield, United States Secretary of the Navy from 1815 to 1818. Some sources give his first name as Alton.

== Education and career ==
Arent graduated from the United States Naval Academy on May 28, 1863 and immediately went into action in the American Civil War, participating in the assault on Fort Fisher while serving on the steam sloop Ticonderoga. After the war, he rose steadily through the ranks, becoming lieutenant on November 10, 1866, and commander on March 25, 1880.

He commanded the training ship Portsmouth from 1878 to 1881, the school ship St. Mary's of the New York Nautical School from 1887 to 1891, and the sloop-of-war Kearsarge from February 1892 to November 1893.

Promoted to captain on July 21, 1894, he took command of the new battleship Maine at her commissioning in 1895, leaving in 1897 to become chief of the Bureau of Navigation with the rank of Rear Admiral.

During the 1898 Spanish–American War, Crowninshield was appointed to the Naval War Board, and had a large part in the United States Naval operations planning that resulted in resounding victories like the Battle of Manila Bay. He retired from the Navy in April 1902, completing 39 years on active service.

Admiral Crowninshield was a member of the Military Order of the Loyal Legion of the United States.

Rear Admiral Crowninshield died in Philadelphia, Pennsylvania, on May 27, 1908, and is buried in Arlington National Cemetery.

== Personal life ==
He married Mary Bradford (1844–1913), daughter of the writer Sarah Hopkins Bradford, in Dresden, Germany, on July 27, 1870. His wife became a published writer herself.
