= Harriet, the Moses of her People =

1868 biography of Tubman by Sarah H. Bradford

Harriet, the Moses of her People, originally published as Scenes in the Life of Harriet Tubman, is an 1868 biography of Harriet Tubman written by Sarah Hopkins Bradford. It is the only biographical work authorized by Tubman in her lifetime.

== Background and production of first edition ==
Harriet Tubman (1822–1913) was an African-American abolitionist and social activist. After escaping slavery, Tubman made some 13 missions to rescue approximately 70 enslaved people, including her family and friends, using the network of antislavery activists and safe houses known collectively as the Underground Railroad. During the American Civil War, she served as an armed scout and spy for the Union Army. After the war, she lived near Auburn, New York, where she worked to help former slaves in need and later became an activist for women's suffrage. Tubman's regular income was very limited, so supporters frequently organized fundraising events for her charitable causes and to help with her own expenses.

Tubman, who had not learned to read or write, hoped to become literate and write her own memoirs, but she never did. Instead, in 1868, the writer Sarah Hopkins Bradford was recruited to help with a plan to sell a biography of Tubman as a fundraiser. Bradford was the author of several children's books, including biographies of Christopher Columbus and Peter the Great. Her brother, Samuel Hopkins II, was a professor at Auburn Theological Seminary and one of Tubman's supporters. Tubman provided her own personal recollections through interviews with Bradford, who also collected journalistic accounts and solicited letters from Tubman's friends and supporters. Bradford worked quickly to complete the book before leaving on a planned trip to Europe. The publication costs were funded through donations so that all the revenue from sales could go to Tubman.

== Publication history ==
Auburn-based printer William J. Moses published Scenes in the Life of Harriet Tubman in November 1868 so it could be sold at a charity event in December, although the publication date given in the printed book is 1869. The 132-page volume brought Tubman some $1,200 in income (equivalent to $29,000 in 2025).

In 1886, at Tubman's request, Bradford released a re-written volume called Harriet, the Moses of her People. Proceeds from sales of the second edition were used towards Tubman's planned Home For The Aged. A final revision, published by Little & Company of New York in 1901, added an appendix with more stories about Tubman's life.

== Presentation of Tubman ==
Criticized by modern biographers for its artistic license and highly subjective point of view, the first edition nevertheless provides insight into Tubman's own view of her experiences. The 1886 revision took a more moralistic and literary tone than the prior work, including changes of many event descriptions from first to third person as well as rearranged depictions of events in chronological order. In all of the book's editions, Tubman is hailed as a latter-day Joan of Arc.

== Sources ==
- Armstrong, Douglas V. (2022). The Archaeology of Harriet Tubman's Life in Freedom. Syracuse, New York: Syracuse University Press. ISBN 978-0-8156-5523-7.
- Clinton, Catherine (2004). Harriet Tubman: The Road to Freedom. New York: Little, Brown and Company. ISBN 978-0-316-14492-6 – via Open Library.
- "Consumer Price Index (estimate) 1800–". Federal Reserve Bank of Minneapolis.
- Humez, Jean M. (Summer 1993). "In Search of Harriet Tubman's Spiritual Autobiography". NWSA Journal. 5 (2): 162–182. JSTOR 4316258.
- Humez, Jean (2003). Harriet Tubman: The Life and Life Stories. Madison: University of Wisconsin Press. ISBN 978-0-299-19120-7 – via Open Library.
- Larson, Kate Clifford (2004). Bound For the Promised Land: Harriet Tubman, Portrait of an American Hero. New York: Ballantine Books. ISBN 978-0-345-45627-4 – via Open Library.
- Larson, Kate Clifford (2022). Harriet Tubman: A Reference Guide to Her Life and Works. Significant Figures in World History series (Kindle ed.). Lanham, Maryland: Rowman & Littlefield. ISBN 978-1-5381-1357-8.
- Sernett, Milton C. (2007). Harriet Tubman: Myth, Memory, and History. Durham and London: Duke University Press. ISBN 978-0-8223-4073-7.
- Walters, Kerry (2020). Harriet Tubman: A Life in American History. Black History Lives series (Kindle ed.). Santa Barbara: ABC-CLIO. ISBN 978-1-4408-5569-6.
