= Harriet Tubman Museum =

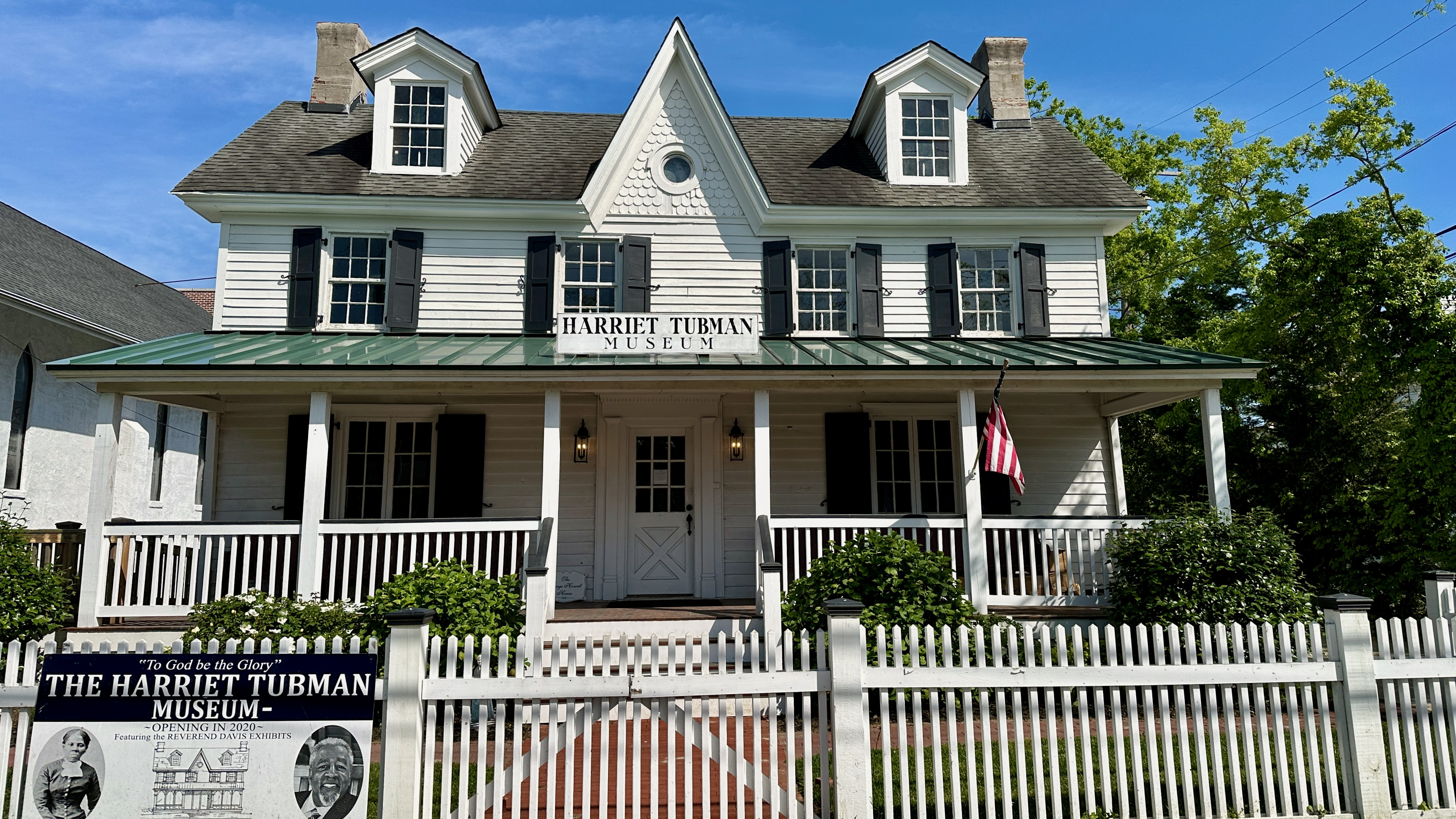
- Established: 17 June 2020
- Location: 632 Lafayette Street, Cape May, New Jersey
- Coordinates: 38.9353°N 74.9212°W
- Macedonia Baptist Church Parsonage
- U.S. Historic district – Contributing property
- Part of: Cape May Historic District (ID70000383)
- Designated CP: December 29, 1970

The Harriet Tubman Museum is located at 632 Lafayette Street in the city of Cape May, New Jersey. It features the life and work of American abolitionist and social activist Harriet Tubman in the state.

It is in the Howell House, which used to be the Macedonia Baptist Church Parsonage, a contributing property of the Cape May Historic District. The facility was renovated to hold the museum.

It had a virtual opening coinciding with Juneteenth (June 19, 2020). It physically opened on Thursday September 17, 2020, with Governor Phil Murphy attending. Murphy had approved a bill designating this as the state's official Harriet Tubman Museum. The museum refers to Tubman's time living in Cape May.

The formal opening to the public was on Juneteenth in 2021. The museum and the Macedonia Baptist Church were added to the New Jersey Black Heritage Trail in 2024.

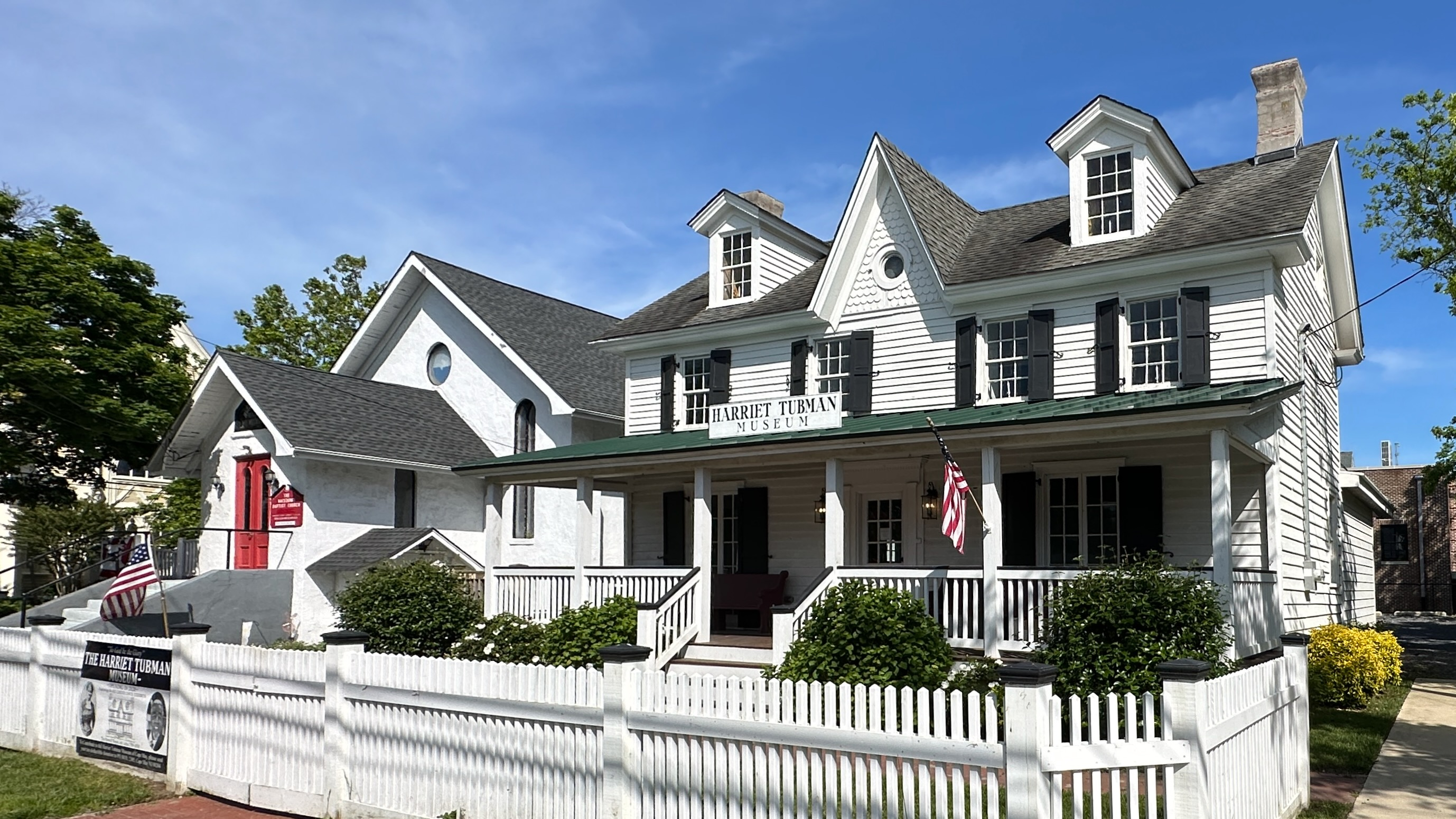
The museum next to the Macedonia Baptist Church

== See also ==
- List of museums focused on African Americans
- List of museums in New Jersey
