= Harriet Tubman Memorial Garden =

Garden in Cambridge, Maryland

Coordinates: 38.5597°N 76.0633°W

The Harriet Tubman Memorial Garden is part of the Harriet Tubman Underground Railroad Byway (Maryland) and is located in Cambridge, Maryland. It honours the life of abolitionist Harriet Tubman and the journeys of the many people she assisted to escape slavery. The garden features information boards and murals, some of which were painted by Charles Ross, a relative of Tubman's.
