= SS Harriet Tubman =

World War II Liberty ship of the United States

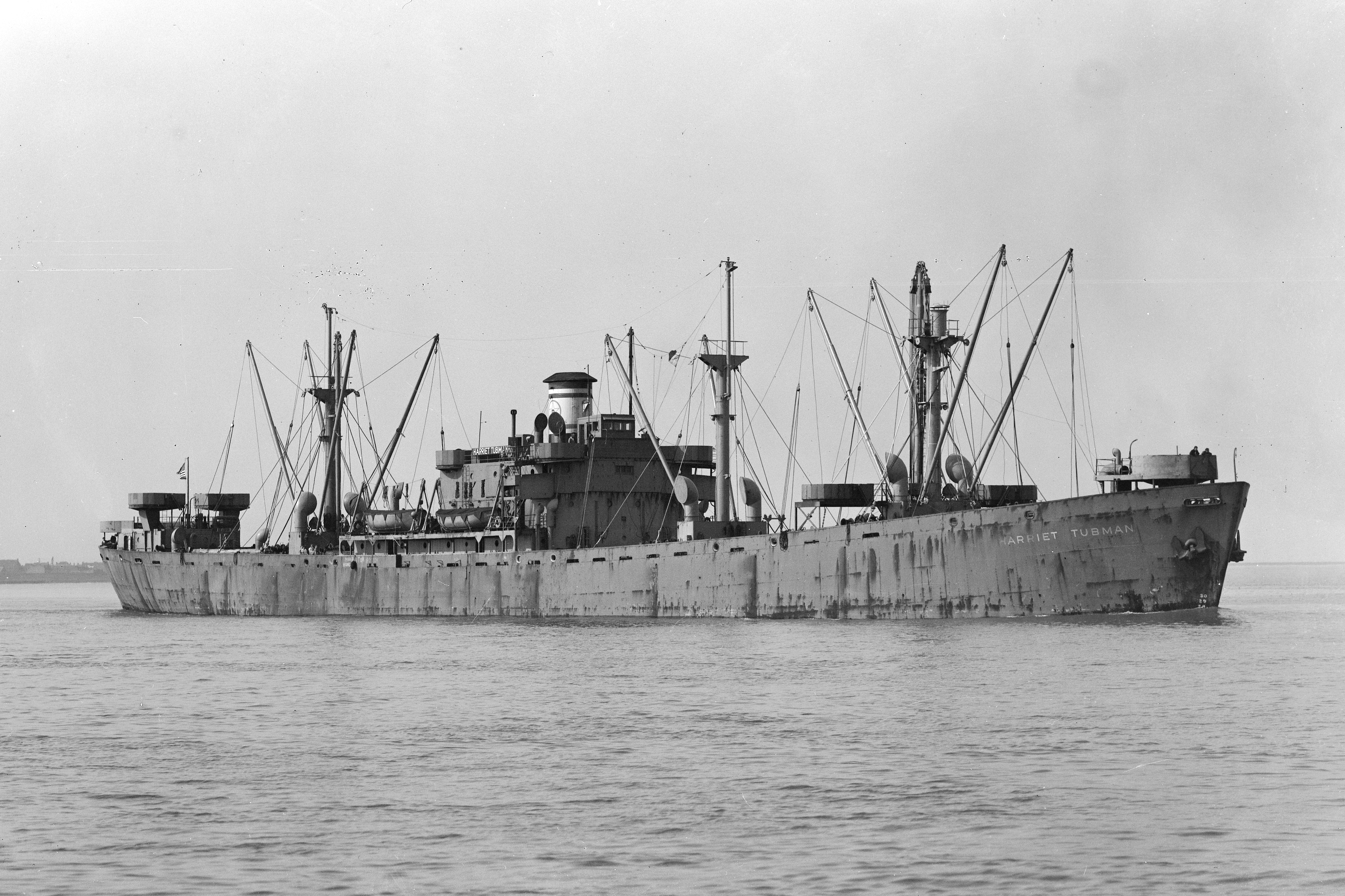
- Harriet Tubman on the river Scheldt

History

United States
- Name: Harriet Tubman
- Namesake: Harriet Tubman
- Builder: South Portland Shipbuilding Corporation, South Portland, Maine
- Yard number: 3032
- Way number: 6
- Laid down: 19 April 1944
- Launched: 3 June 1944
- Acquired: 13 June 1944
- Homeport: Portland, Me
- Identification: IMO number: 5143247; Call sign: WHRE
- Fate: Scrapped in Houston, TX, 1973

General characteristics
- Type: Liberty ship
- Tonnage: 7,000 long tons deadweight (DWT)
- Length: 441 ft 6 in (134.57 m)
- Beam: 56 ft 11 in (17.35 m)
- Draft: 27 ft 9 in (8.46 m)
- Propulsion: Two oil-fired boilers; Triple expansion steam engine; Single screw; 2,500 hp (1,864 kW)
- Speed: 11 knots (20 km/h; 13 mph)
- Capacity: 9,140 tons cargo
- Complement: 41
- Armament: 1 × Stern-mounted 4 in (100 mm) deck gun; AA guns

SS Harriet Tubman (MC contract 3032) was a Liberty ship built in the United States during World War II. She was named after Harriet Tubman, an African-American abolitionist and spy during the American Civil War, and was the first Liberty ship to be named for an African-American woman.

The ship was laid down by the South Portland Shipbuilding Corporation, South Portland, Maine, on 19 April 1944, then launched on 3 June 1944. Twenty-two members of Tubman's extended family attended the launch. Eva Stuart Northrup, Tubman's great-niece, christened the ship. The ship survived the war and remained in active service until June 1952. Laid up in the Beaumont Reserve Fleet she would suffer the same fate as nearly all other Liberty ships; she was scrapped in 1973.

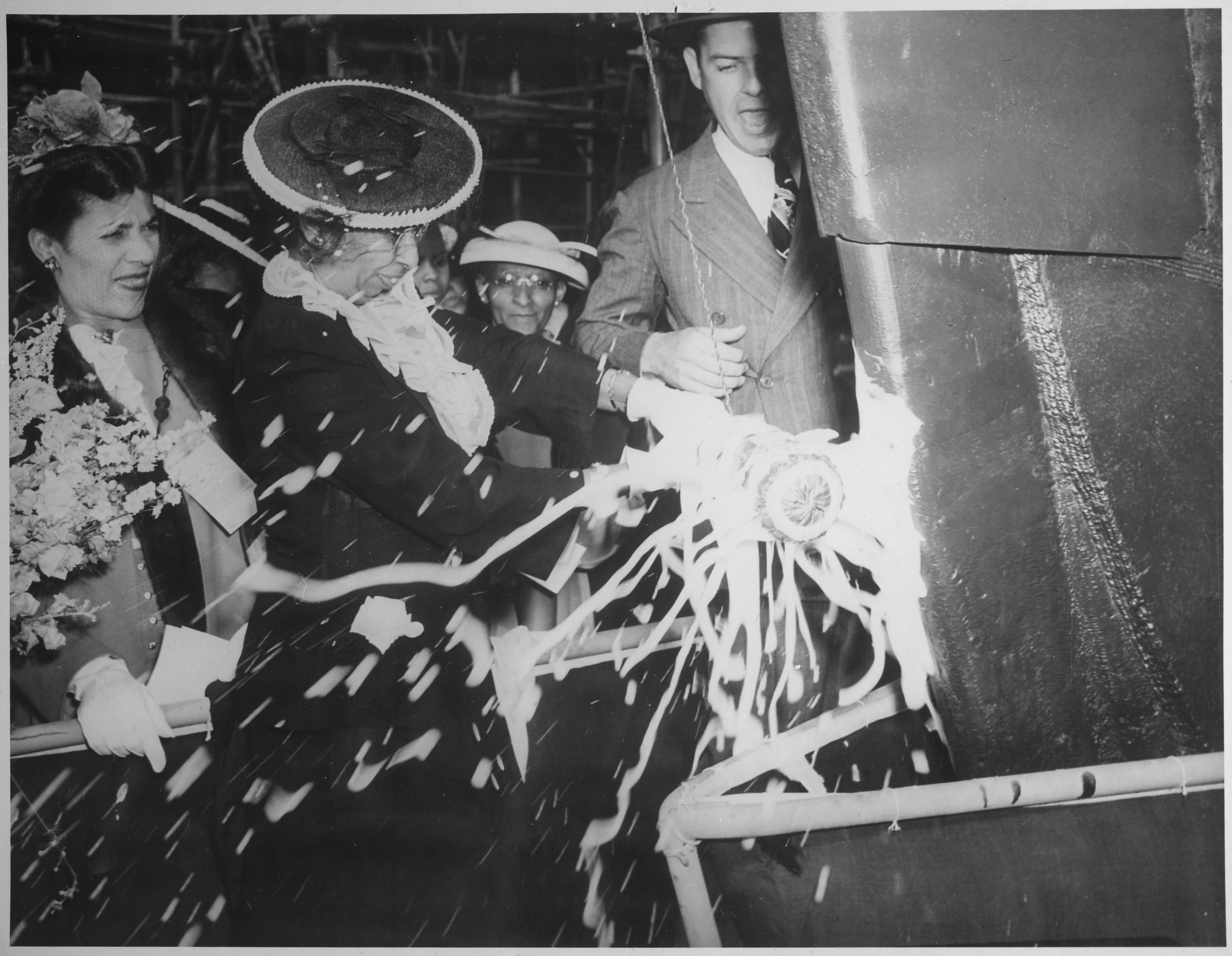
The launching party for SS Harriet Tubman, 3 June 1944
