= Uncle Sam's Farm =

Song
- Written: Unknown
- Songwriter: Jesse Hutchinson

Uncle Sam's Farm is a song based on a poem by Jesse Hutchinson, Jr., written in 1848 to encourage immigration to the American West. It was popularized by the Hutchinson Family Singers. It is part of the Roud Folk Song Index and is number 4556 on the list.

== Lyrics ==
Of all the mighty nations in the East or in the West,
O this glorious Yankee nation is the greatest and the best.
We have room for all creation and our banner is unfurled,
Here's a general invitation to the people of the world.

Chorus: Then come along, come along, make no delay;
Come from every nation, come from every way.
Our lands, they are broad enough - don't be alarmed,
For Uncle Sam is rich enough to give us all a farm.

St. Lawrence marks our Northern line as fast her waters flow;
And the Rio Grande our Southern bound, way down to Mexico.
From the great Atlantic Ocean where the sun begins to dawn,
Leap across the Rocky Mountains far away to Oregon.

Chorus: Then come along, come along, make no delay;
Come from every nation, come from every way.
Our lands, they are broad enough - don't be alarmed,
For Uncle Sam is rich enough to give us all a farm.

While the South shall raise the cotton, and the West, the corn and pork,
New England manufactories shall do up the finer work;
For the deep and flowing waterfalls that course along our hills
Are just the thing for washing sheep and driving cotton mills.

Chorus: Then come along, come along, make no delay;
Come from every nation, come from every way.
Our lands, they are broad enough - don't be alarmed,
For Uncle Sam is rich enough to give us all a farm.

Our fathers gave us liberty, but little did they dream
The grand results that pour along this mighty age of steam;
For our mountains, lakes and rivers are all a blaze of fire,
And we send our news by lightning on the telegraphic wires.

Chorus: Then come along, come along, make no delay;
Come from every nation, come from every way.
Our lands, they are broad enough - don't be alarmed,
For Uncle Sam is rich enough to give us all a farm.

The brave in every nation are joining heart and hand
And flocking to America, the real promised land;
And Uncle Sam stands ready with a child upon each arm
To give them all a welcome to a lot upon his farm.

Chorus: Then come along, come along, make no delay;
Come from every nation, come from every way.
Our lands, they are broad enough - don't be alarmed,
For Uncle Sam is rich enough to give us all a farm.

A welcome, warm and hearty, do we give the sons of toil
To come to the West and settle and labor on free soil;
We've room enough and land enough, they needn't feel alarm -
O! come to the land of freedom and vote yourself a farm.

Chorus: Then come along, come along, make no delay;
Come from every nation, come from every way.
Our lands, they are broad enough - don't be alarmed,
For Uncle Sam is rich enough to give us all a farm.

Yes! we're bound to lead the nations for our motto's "Go ahead,"
And we'll tell the foreign paupers that our people are well fed;
For the nations must remember that Uncle Sam is not a fool,
For the people do the voting and the children go to school.

Chorus: Then come along, come along, make no delay;
Come from every nation, come from every way.
Our lands, they are broad enough - don't be alarmed,
For Uncle Sam is rich enough to give us all a farm

== Recordings ==
- Happy Land: Musical Tributes to Laura Ingalls Wilder
