= Naomi André =

American scholar of music

Academic background
- Education: Barnard College (BA); Harvard University (PhD)

Academic work
- Discipline: Musicology
- Institutions: University of Michigan; University of North Carolina at Chapel Hill

Naomi André is an American scholar of music. She is the David G. Frey Distinguished Professor in Music at the University of North Carolina at Chapel Hill. She is also the first scholar-in-residence of the Seattle Opera and the Des Moines Metro Opera.

== Biography ==
André grew up the only child of a single mother. Her mother sang high coloratura soprano and studied operatic singing at the Juilliard School. She received her B.A. from Barnard College in 1989. She was the first black woman to earn a Ph.D. from Harvard University’s department of music in 1996.

André taught at the University of Michigan, first at the University of Michigan School of Music, Theatre & Dance, then at the College of Literature, Science, and the Arts until 2022, when she joined the faculty of the University of North Carolina at Chapel Hill. Her scholarship focuses on 19th century Italian Opera as well as the issues of race, representation and gender in Opera with an expertise in the works of composer Giuseppe Verdi.

In 2020, André was named the inaugural scholar-in-residence of the Seattle Opera, where she acts as an adviser to help the opera company become more inclusive, both for contemporary audiences and behind the scenes, such as improving racial and gender representation in the company's internal operations. In 2022, she was also named the inaugural scholar-in-residence of the Des Moines Metro Opera for the 2022 festival season.
