= Walter Robinson (composer) =

American composer

Walter Robinson is an American composer of the late 20th century. He is most notable for his 1977 song Harriet Tubman, which has been recorded by folk musicians such as Holly Near, John McCutcheon, and others. He is also the composer of several operas, including Look What a Wonder, an opera drawing on folk and gospel music based on the story of Denmark Vesey's 1822 slave rebellion.
