= Harold Jackman =

Educator, model, patron of the arts (1901–1961)

- Jackman by Carl Van Vechten in 1940
- Born: August 18, 1901; London, England
- Died: July 8, 1961 (aged 59); Maine, USA
- Education: New York University; Columbia University
- Occupation: Teacher

Harold Jackman (August 18, 1901 – July 8, 1961) was a British-born teacher, model, and patron of the arts with emphasis on African American art and literature. Raised in Harlem, Jackman was known for his involvement in the Harlem Renaissance and his dedication to preserving African American cultural artifacts. He founded the Countee Cullen Memorial Collection at Atlanta University and contributed to the James Weldon Johnson Collection of Yale University, the Literary Collection of Fisk University, and to the Schomburg Collection at the Harlem branch of the New York Public Library. Along with Regina M. Anderson and Dorothy Randolph Peterson, he was also a co-founder of the Harlem Experimental Theater.

== Biography ==
Jackman was born in London on August 18, 1901. His mother, Maud Jackman, was West Indian. When he was a child, his mother moved with her two children to Harlem, New York. He attended the all-boys DeWitt Clinton High School in the Bronx, where he met Countee Cullen, who became his lifelong friend. Jackman earned his bachelor's degree from New York University in 1923 and his master's degree from Columbia University in 1927. He went on to teach social studies for thirty years in the New York Public School System.

Jackman was a supporter and promoter of African American theater. He was a founding member for the Krigwa Players Little Negro Theater in 1926. He directed Georgia Douglas Johnson's Plumes for the company in 1929. He also helped establish the Harlem Experimental Theater in 1929, and was a member of the American Theater Wing Stage Door Canteen in the 1940s.

For over three decades Jackman worked as a model, most notably for Ophelia DeVore's The Grace Del Marco Agency. He was featured in Winold Reiss' drawing A College Lad (1925). Jackman was the model for Carl Van Vechten's protagonist in Nigger Heaven (1926). He also appeared as a character in Wallace Thurman's novel Infants of Spring (1932).

Jackman was a member of the Alpha Phi Alpha fraternity, the Urban League, and the Negro Actors Guild on which he served as the executive board. Jackman was an associate editor of New Challenge magazine from 1935 to 1937. He was also a contributing editor to Phylon from 1944 to 1956 and an advisory editor from 1957 to 1961.

Jackman was a collector of African American memorabilia and black cultural artifacts. His diaries and collections of have been used as a resource for writers and historians. His collections are held in depositories across the country, including the Amistad Research Center at Tulane University in New Orleans and Atlanta University in Georgia.

Jackman was a part of Harlem's gay community and frequented the Hamilton Lodge Ball, an annual masquerade which attracted thousands of costumed men and women dressed in drag. Jackman was a well-known bachelor throughout his life. He frequently escorted single women and was usually king of the Urban League's Beaux Arts Ball. Jackman spent periods in Europe, particularly in Paris where he met expatriate writer Edouard Roditi. He was known for being social and mingled with various prominent figures of the Harlem Renaissance such as Langston Hughes, Carl Van Vetchen, Wallace Thurman, Claude McKay, and Countee Cullen.

Jackman was best known for his friendship with poet Countee Cullen who he met in high school. They were called the "Johnathan and David of the Harlem Renaissance" because of their close friendship. Cullen dedicated his famous poem "Heritage" to Jackman. Jackman introduced Cullen to his first wife Yolande Du Bois, daughter of W. E. B. Du Bois, and was the best man at their wedding in 1928. Two months after the wedding, Jackman and Cullen traveled together to Europe without the bride, which has led scholars to surmise that they were lovers. After Cullen died in 1946, Jackman requested that the Georgia accumulation of artifacts be renamed from the Harold Jackman Collection to the Countee Cullen Memorial Collection in his honor. After Jackman died the collection was changed to the Cullen-Jackman Collection.

Jackman died in a Maine hospital on July 8, 1961. He was survived by a brother, Bertram Jackman, and sister, Ivie Jackman. His estate was estimated at $40,000 (US$430,958 in 2025 dollars) at the time of his death. Listed as beneficiaries were his sister Ivie Jackman and his friend Mrs. Diana Jean Shaw.

== Legacy ==
Jackman's sister Ivie Jackman instituted the Harold Jackman Memorial Committee and she was chairman.

The Cullen-Jackman Memorial Collection at Atlanta University "documents the artistic and creative nature of those of African descent."

The Harold Jackman Memorial Award was established in his honor. Recipients include Diahann Carroll (1973) and Geoffrey Holder (1982).
