= Marie Jackson Stuart =

Black American suffragist (1878-1925)

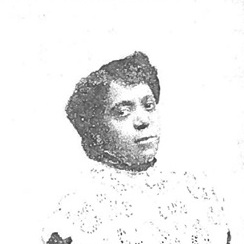
- Secretary of the New York Federation c. 1912
- Born: 1878; Pennsylvania
- Died: November 14, 1925 (aged 46–47); New York, New York
- Occupations: Actress and activist

Marie Jackson Stuart (1878-1925) was a New York-based dramatic reader who used her performances and oratory skills to promote Black women's suffrage. She was president of the Harriet Tubman Neighborhood Club of New York when Tubman died and it was Stuart who designed a marker for Tubman's grave.

== Biography ==
Marie Jackson Stuart was born around 1878 in Pennsylvania.

She moved to New York sometime before 1906, where she was first known for her oratory and elocution. She was also involved in acting and drama, women's clubs, and the Black women's suffrage movement. In 1906, she purchased a home in Orange, New Jersey. She held concerts and recitals to benefit local clubs or charities.

=== Dramatic career ===
Stuart performed at lyceum venues, such as Carnegie Lyceum and St. Mark's lyceum. In 1909, the Women's Suffrage League sponsored a lyceum activity where Stuart spoke about "Negro Citizenship." Stuart served as the corresponding secretary for St. Mark's Lyceum in 1910.

Her most prominent performance was in Three Plays for a Negro Theatre in 1917. where she played Granny Maumee. The play was put on by the Colored Players at the Old Garden Theatre in Madison Square Garden, and it marked a change in how Black actors were perceived by critics and the public. The play was radical for its discussion of racial identity and the position of Black people in the American framework.

Stuart worked with W. E. B. Dubois to help produce The Pageant for the New York Emancipation Exposition, which toured around the US.

=== Activism ===
Stuart was a founding member and organizer of the Empire State Federation of Women's Clubs, and served as secretary and organizer. She attended the 1913 convention in Buffalo, New York.

By 1912, Stuart was president of the Harriet Tubman Neighborhood Club of New York. When Tubman died in 1913, the Club hosted a memorial for her death and Stuart spoke at the service. Over the next two years under her guidance, the club raised money to build a monument over her unmarked grave in Auburn, NY. Stuart designed the marker.

Stuart was involved with several organizations that focused on improving the lives of young Black women. She was part of the Brooklyn YWCA and directed at least one dramatic performance of young ladies. Stuart was tied to the White Rose Industrial Association and attended or performed at several of their functions. She sat on the board of the Union Rescue Home.

=== Death and legacy ===
Stuart died on November 14, 1925, in New York.

== See also ==
- African-American women's suffrage movement
- Black suffrage in the United States
- Theater companies of the Harlem Renaissance
