= Claude McKay, Code Name Sasha =

2007 non-fiction book

Claude McKay, Code Name Sasha: Queer Black Marxism and the Harlem Renaissance
- Author: Gary Edward Holcomb
- Publisher: University Press of Florida
- Publication date: 1 May 2007
- ISBN: 9780813030494
- OCLC: 78893075

Claude McKay, Code Name Sasha: Queer Black Marxism and the Harlem Renaissance is a non-fiction book by Gary Edward Holcomb analyzing Claude McKay's A Long Way from Home, Banjo, Home to Harlem, and Romance in Marseille. It was published in 2007 by the University Press of Florida.

== General references ==
- Claborn, John (2008). "Claude McKay, Code Name Sasha: Queer Black Marxism and the Harlem Renaissance". Callaloo. 31 (2): 617–621. doi:10.1353/cal.0.0106. ISSN 1080-6512.
- Edwards, Brent Hayes (2010). "Review of Claude McKay, Code Name Sasha: Queer Black Marxism and the Harlem Renaissance". NWIG: New West Indian Guide / Nieuwe West-Indische Gids. 84 (3/4): 330–335. ISSN 1382-2373.
- Gosciak, J. (December 2009). "Claude McKay, Code Name Sasha: Queer Black Marxism and the Harlem Renaissance (review)". African American Review. 43 (4): 762–763. doi:10.1353/afa.2009.0082. ISSN 1945-6182.
- Reyes, Javier (2008-01-01). "Holcomb, Gary. Claude McKay, Code Name Sasha: Queer Black Marxism and the Harlem Renaissance". Anthurium: A Caribbean Studies Journal. 6 (1): 11. doi:10.33596/anth.118. ISSN 1547-7150.
