= Walter Jekyll =

English clergyman, later secularist philosopher and planter in Jamaica

Walter Jekyll (/ˈdʒiːkəl/ JEE-kəl; 27 November 1849, Bramley, Surrey, England – 17 February 1929, Bower Hall, Riverside, Hanover, Jamaica) was an English clergyman who renounced his religion and became a planter in Jamaica, where he collected and published songs and stories from the local African-Caribbean community.

== Early life ==
Jekyll lived in his youth with his family at 2 Grafton Street, Mayfair, London, the youngest of the seven children of Captain Edward Joseph Hill Jekyll, an officer in the Grenadier Guards, and his wife Julia Hammersley. His sister was the gardener Gertrude Jekyll. He was educated at Harrow and Trinity College, Cambridge. Jekyll was a friend of Robert Louis Stevenson, who may have borrowed the family name for his 1886 novella Strange Case of Dr Jekyll and Mr Hyde, though this remains speculative.

== Clerical career ==
He was ordained as a Church of England deacon in 1874, and as a priest in 1875, becoming the rector of Holy Trinity church, Heydon, Cambridgeshire until 1877. He then became a minor canon of Worcester Cathedral until 1879 when he became a chaplain at Malta. In 1880 he lost his faith and stood down from his church career.

== Subsequent career ==
He moved to Milan where he learnt singing with Francesco Lamperti. He returned to England where he provided an English translation of his Art of Singing in 1884.

== Life in Jamaica ==
Jekyll set sail for Jamaica from Southampton on 24 October 1894. Aside from a brief visit to England in 1895, he spent the rest of his life there. Accompanying him was his long-time companion Lieutenant-Colonel Ernest Boyle.

Following a narrow escape in a landslide in the 1907 Kingston earthquake he moved to Bower Hill, Lucea. He soon gained a reputation for a broad range of knowledge and a generosity in sharing it. Local residents would go to him to resolve queries concerning questions of music, literature, religion, botany and science. The phrase "Ask Mr. Jekyll" became popular at this time. He regularly organised seminars on a Saturday morning covering music and literature.

His musical skills were particularly noted. Not only did he publish a significant collection of Jamaican folk songs, but he would regularly practice on his grand piano at precisely 1pm each day with the windows open. Local residents would gather nearby to listen to him play.

Jekyll became a mentor to Jamaican-born poet and writer Claude McKay, whom he met when McKay was seventeen, and may have been a lover. Jekyll later had a mentoring relationship other young men: a singer Johnny Lyons, and a Jamaican peasant, whom McKay's brother described as "an ignorant fellow from Hanover Parish", and to whom he left his estate.

Jekyll was buried in the graveyard of the Hanover Parish Church, Lucea. On his tombstone this epitaph is inscribed: "Musician, gardener, philosopher, teacher, and writer, he lived 34 years in this Island of his adopting, where he gave himself to the service of others and was greatly beloved by all who knew him."

== Works ==
=== The Bible Untrustworthy (1904) ===
This book, The Bible Untrustworthy. A Critical Comparison of Contradictory Passages in the Scriptures, with a View of Testing Their Historical Accuracy, London: Watts and Co., The book was reviewed in Open Court, the official publication of the Free Religious Association :

"This volume of 284 pages proposes the question, “Is the Bible the inspired word of God?” and naturally answers it in the negative. The author goes over many errors and objectionable passages, including the blood-thirstiness of Yahveh, the legend of the fall, the fish-stories of the New Testament, the prophecies, the sins of David, the inhumanities of the patriarchs, and other religious errors, miracles, authorship of the Fourth Gospel, etc., etc., and finds the book that contains them wanting. He is not an irreligious man. On the contrary, he believes that we need a religion, and on account of the untenableness of dogmas rejects the Christian creed and prefers a rationalised faith which recognises the truths of Eastern religions, especially Buddhism with its noble ethics and universal lovingkindness. The author condemns especially the efforts of the Bible League to establish faith in the Bible and to suppress the higher criticism as far as possible. For this purpose he criticises the leaders of this movement for their lack of truthfulness and concludes his book with the following conciliatory comment: “In parting from them let me ask their forgiveness if I have said anything which they may think too hard. I have written purely in the interest of truth. The war is with principles, not with them.”

=== Jamaican Song and Story (1907) ===
Jekyll published Jamaican Song and Story: Annancy Stories, Digging Sings, Ring Tunes, and Dancing Tunes, in (1907), with introduction by Alice Werner and appendices by Charles Samuel Myers and Lucy Broadwood. The book made a major contribution to recording and analysing Jamaican folk music.

=== The Wisdom of Schopenhauer (1911) ===
The Wisdom of Schopenhauer: As Revealed in Some of His Principal Writings, London: Watts and Co. consists of texts selected and translated by Walter Jekyll MA formerly of Trinity College, Cambridge, and issued for the Rationalist Press Association. The publisher was primarily concerned with publishing cheap editions of popular science and secular texts for a largely working class readership. The edition consists of extracts from The Will in Nature, Essay on the Freedom of the Will, The Basis of Ethics, and the Parerga and Paralipomena.

- The Wisdom of Schopenhauer: As Revealed in Some of His Principal Writings Full text on pdf.

=== Other ===
Jekyll was a regular contributor to The Garden, to which his brother Herbert had contributed in 1871, and of which his sister, Gertrude, had become an editor in 1900.

He also provided the introduction and footnotes to Claude McKay's Songs of Jamaica (1912).

== In fiction ==
In his novel Banana Bottom (1933), first published four years after Jekyll's death, Claude McKay states "This story belongs to the Jamaican period of the early nineteen hundreds, and all the characters, as in my previous novels are imaginary, excepting perhaps Squire Gensir". Rhonda Cobham has argued that the figure of Squire Gensir, the mentor of the lead character, Bita Plant, constitutes McKay's eulogy to his former mentor. McKay describes Squire Gensir thus:

"For Squire Gensir was held in high esteem everywhere and enjoyed an honourable reputation among all classes, clerical as much as lay people, although he was openly atheistic. For he was not antagonistic to ecclesiastical folk as a social group and sometimes on his long lonely tramps in the country he had taken tea with some of them as well as the gentry. Indeed he was asked more often than he accepted, as he preferred to live his life almost entirely amongst the peasantry."
