= Regina M. Anderson =

American playwright and librarian

Regina Mathilde Anderson
- Born: Regina M. Anderson; May 21, 1901; Chicago, Illinois, US
- Died: February 5, 1993 (aged 91); Ossining, New York, US
- Other names: Regina M. Andrews (married name); Ursula Trelling (pen name)
- Education: Wilberforce University, Columbia University School of Library Service
- Occupation: Librarian
- Employer: New York Public Library
- Known for: Dedicated Librarianship, integral member of Harlem Renaissance, breaking the color barrier
- Spouse: William Trent Andrews, Jr.
- Children: 1

Regina M. Anderson (May 21, 1901 – February 5, 1993) was an American playwright and librarian. Influenced by Ida B. Wells and the lack of Black history teachings in school, Anderson became a key member of the Harlem Renaissance.

== Biography ==
Regina Anderson was born in the Hyde Park section of Chicago, Illinois, to Margaret Simons Anderson and William Grant "Habeas Corpus" Anderson. Her mother was a ceramicist, and her father was an attorney.Her parents were identified as Black in 1900 and mixed-race with Black Heritage in the 1910 United States census. (Note: She is identified by Whitemore as an African American, but the heritage information in the JSTOR article is incorrect, based upon census records for Regina and her parents in 1900 and 1910. There was a man from Sweden named William G. Anderson from Chicago, but his wife was Charlotte Olivia Jungblom.) Regina's ancestry highlight a multicultural background, as she was of Native American, Jewish, East Indian, Swedish, and other European ancestries. One of her grandparents was a Confederate general while her other grandparent was of African descent and born in Madagascar. Due to the success of her father, Anderson grew up in an upper-middle-class family. After her parents' divorce, she was sent to live with her grandparents from her mother's side in Normal, Illinois. After spending a few years in Normal, she journeyed back to Chicago and graduated from Hyde Park High School in 1919. Anderson studied at the historically black college Wilberforce University and worked in its Carnegie Library.

After studying there for a year, Anderson returned home to Chicago and was hired as a junior library assistant at the Chicago Public Library in 1921. A short time after, she vacationed in New York where decided to stay. Eventually, she first settled in downtown Manhattan living at a YWCA. While staying at the YWCA, she applied to be a librarian at the 135th Street branch of the New York Public Library, working under the supervision of Ernestine Rose.

She shared an apartment in the Sugar Hill district of Harlem with Ethel Ray and Louella Tucker. The women opened the space to the community, hosting salons, events, and gatherings for artists. Located at 580 Saint Nicholas Avenue, the apartment became known as the "580," the "Dream Haven," and the "Harlem West Side Literary Salon." Her apartment became a place where writers such as Claude McKay and Alain Locke would work. Anderson helped to organize the Civic Club dinner of 1924 for Black New York intellectuals and writers. Attended by 110 guests, including W. E. B. Du Bois, Jean Toomer, Countee Cullen, Charles S. Johnson, Hubert Thomas Delany, and Langston Hughes, the dinner was one of the coalescing events of the Harlem Renaissance.

Anderson and Du Bois co-founded the Krigwa Players (later Negro Experimental Theatre), a Black theater company that originally performed in the library's basement. The Players produced her plays Climbing Jacob's Ladder (about a lynching) and Underground (about the Underground Railroad). Anderson wrote both Climbing Jacob's Ladder and Underground under the pen name Ursala Trelling. The Krigwa Players disbanded, and Anderson created the Harlem Experimental Theatre with Dorothy Peterson and Harold Jackman.

On April 10, 1926, Anderson married the Howard University and Columbia Law School grad William T. Andrews, from Sumter, South Carolina. Andrews was an NAACP lawyer and New York assemblyman. In 1948, the couple adopted a daughter, Regina Ann, who was born in 1945.

She was the first minority to climb the ranks and become a supervising librarian at the New York Public Library, at the 115th Street branch in 1938, and her struggle to break the color barrier has earned her numerous accolades. Regina Anderson was one of ten African-American women whose contributions were recognized at the 1939 World's Fair in New York. The Women's Service League awarded Anderson a medal for being the first woman of color to serve as the head of a New York library branch.

While working at the Washington Heights branch library, Anderson served on the boards and committees of several organizations. She was a Vice President of the National Council of Women of the United States and represented the National Urban League as a member of the United States National Commission for UNESCO. Anderson traveled to West Germany, various countries in West Africa, and several Asian countries from 1958 through 1965. She retired from the New York Public Library in 1966. In 1968, Anderson was a consultant for the Metropolitan Museum of Art's exhibit Harlem on My Mind. Later, Anderson wrote The Black New Yorkers partially due to her experience working on that exhibit.

Anderson outlived virtually all of the other members of the Harlem Renaissance. She died at the Bethel Nursing Home in Ossining, a suburb of New York City. In her will, she left thousands of dollars to organizations in New York, including the National Urban League, the NAACP, the National Council of Women of the United States, the American Council for Nationalities Services, and the Washington Heights Branch of the NYPL.

== Career as a librarian ==
Anderson moved to New York in 1922, at the age of 21, to apply for a librarian position at the New York Public Library. Previously, she had worked in various libraries in and around Chicago. Her first position in New York was at the 135th Street branch of the New York Public Library. She started her position as a full-time clerk in 1923 under the leadership of Ernestine Rose, who wanted to make sure the community was served by librarians that reflected their diversity.

During this time, the library hosted meetings by groups like the NAACP and the Anti-Lynching Crusaders. Anderson also organized lectures by individuals like Hubert Harrison and Margaret Sanger. In 1948, Anderson began working at the Washington Heights branch with the title of Supervising Librarian, and while there, she created a community outreach program called "Family Night at the Library." The program focused on African, Caribbean, Latin American, Southeast Asian, and African-American culture, politics, and history. Guest speakers, such as artists, writers, and government representatives, participated. Art exhibitions, artifacts, and annotated biographies often supplemented programming.

Over the 44 years of her career as a librarian, Anderson worked at the 135th Street, Hamilton Fish Park, Woodstock, Rivington, 115th Street, and Washington Heights branch libraries. Anderson retired from the NYPL in 1966 but continued to remain active in her community.

== Works ==
- Climbing Jacob's Ladder (1931, play)
- Underground (1932, play)
- A Public Library Assists in Improving Race Relations (1946, thesis)
- Intergroup Relations in the United States: A Compilation of Source Material and Service Organizations (1959, article)
- Chronology of African-Americans in New York, 1621–1966 (1971, co-editor)
- The Man Who Passed: A Play in One Act (published posthumously in 1996, play)
- The Black New Yorkers (published posthumously, book)
- Matilda (one-act play)
- The Prince and the Porker (1955, children's book)
- The Rabbit Who Saw the World Outside (children's book)
- The Shoeshoe Rabbit (children's book)
- The Words of Regina Andrews (1974, published chapter in Voices of the Black Theater (edited by Loften Mitchell)
