= History of Anglicanism in Jamaica =

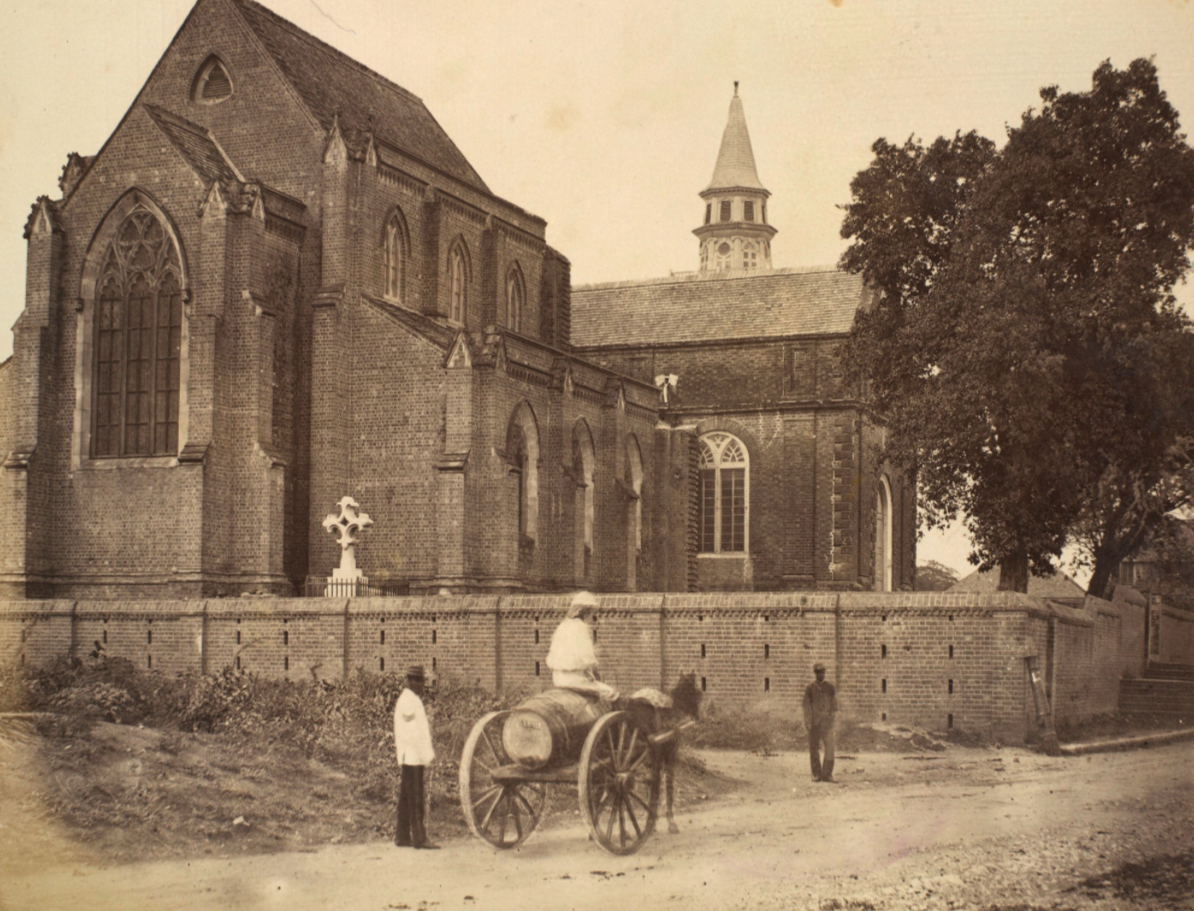
The Anglican Cathedral, Spanish Town, Jamaica

The History of Anglicanism in Jamaica began shortly after the conquest of the Spanish-held island of Jamaica by an English Army during the Anglo-Spanish War (1654–1660). It immediately developed a major role in the political and social structure of the colony. Although nominally under the jurisdiction of the Bishop of London, the clergy were in practice under the control of their parish vestry.

== Under the Commonwealth ==
The military and naval forces led by Robert Venables and William Penn during their invasion were accompanied by seven clergymen, who however succumbed to the tropical fever which was responsible for around 200 deaths a day amongst the English troops.

Alongside ordering the deportation of 2,000 young people from Ireland, the Commissioners of the Navy in 1655 ordered that 2,000 bibles be supplied, presumably for their use.

== Under the restored monarchy ==
Charles II appointed Edward D'Oyley as the first Governor of Jamaica in 1661, with instructions to "discourage vice and debauchery and to encourage ministers that Christianity and the Protestant religion, according to the Church of England, might have due reverence and exercise." D'Oyley, a parliamentarian officer of the New Model Army was soon replaced by Thomas, Lord Windsor.

== Diocese of Jamaica ==
The Diocese of Jamaica was established on 24 July, 1824, with Christopher Lipscomb appointed as the first Bishop of Jamaica. He arrived in Jamaica on 11 February 1825.

== See also ==
- Hanover Parish Church, Lucea
