= Harriet Tubman Grave =

- U.S. National Register of Historic Places
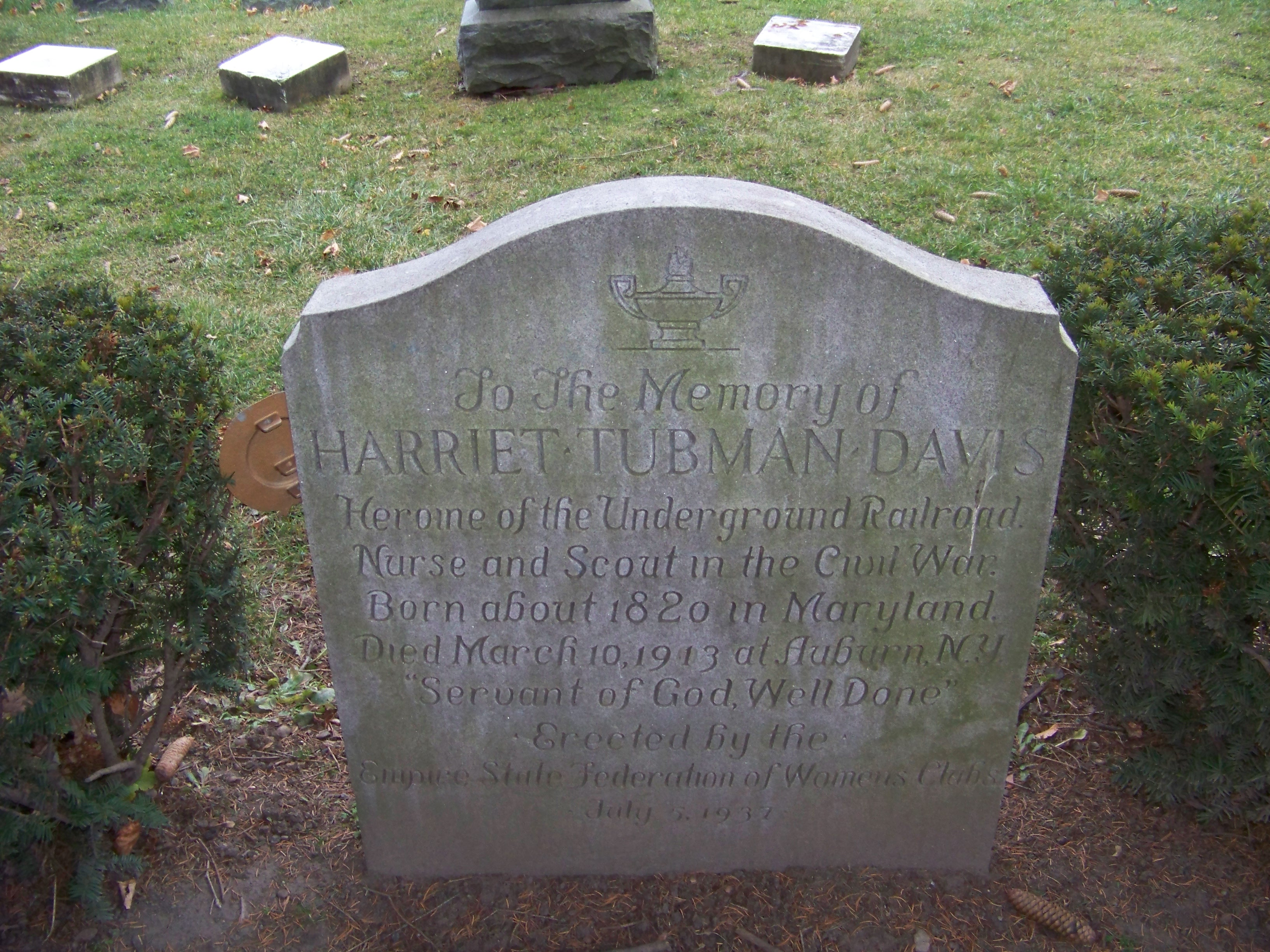

- Location within New York Location within the United States
- Location: Fort Hill Cemetery, Auburn, New York
- Coordinates: 42°55′29″N 76°34′29″W
- Area: less than one acre
- Built: 1937
- MPS: Harriet Tubman in Auburn, New York MPS
- NRHP reference No.: 99000348
- Added to NRHP: April 02, 1999

Harriet Tubman Grave is a historic gravesite located in Fort Hill Cemetery at Auburn, in Cayuga County, New York. The granite gravestone marks the resting place of famed African-American abolitionist Harriet Tubman, who was born into slavery in Maryland in the United States in 1822.

The gravestone marker is approximately three feet tall, and was erected in 1937 by the Empire State Federation of Women's Clubs. The original marker from 1915 was sponsored by the Harriet Tubman Neighborhood Club out of New York, New York. Marie Jackson Stuart was the president of this women's club and designed the original marker.

It is carved with the name "Harriet Tubman Davis (1820–1913)" on the front. On the back is an inscription commemorating Tubman's work with the Underground Railroad and her role as scout and nurse during the Civil War. The religious faith that marked all her activities is noted with the inscription "Servant of God, Well Done." The gravesite is located on Fort Hill Cemetery's "West Lawn C", beneath a large tree, with one small yew bush on each side of her headstone.

Harriet Tubman's grave is the focus of an annual pilgrimage by the Thompson AME Zion Church to commemorate her life and work.

The gravesite was listed on the National Register of Historic Places in 1999.

== See also ==
- Harriet Tubman Underground Railroad National Monument
