= Frances Reynolds Keyser =

American suffragist & educator (1860s–1932)

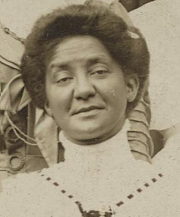
- Frances Reynolds Keyser, from a 1909 photograph.
- Born: 1860s Georgia
- Died: 1932; New York
- Education: Hunter College
- Occupations: Educator, suffragist, clubwoman
- Employer(s): White Rose Mission, Daytona Normal and Industrial Institute
- Organization(s): Brooklyn Equal Suffrage League, YWCA, National Association of Colored Women, Northeastern Federation of Colored Women's Clubs, Empire State Federation of Women's Clubs, National Association for the Advancement of Colored People (NAACP)

Frances Reynolds Keyser (1860s – 1932) was an American suffragist, clubwoman, and educator. She succeeded Victoria Earle Matthews as superintendent of the White Rose Mission in New York City, and was academic dean of the Daytona Normal and Industrial Institute alongside school founder Mary McLeod Bethune.

== Early life and education ==
Frances Reynolds was born in Georgia during the American Civil War, in about 1862. Because she showed promise, a philanthropist funded her visit to New York City, to train as a teacher. In 1880 she graduated from Hunter College with honors.

== Career ==
Reynolds taught in New York City as a young woman. After she was widowed, she returned to the South, and taught in Maryland and Florida. Victoria Earle Matthews brought her back to New York to work at the White Rose Mission, a Christian residence, kindergarten, library, and community center. Keyser became the superintendent at the White Rose when Matthews died in 1907. In 1911, she spoke at a conference of social workers about her work at the White Rose.

Keyser moved to Florida again in 1912, to assist Mary McLeod Bethune at the Daytona Normal and Industrial Institute, until Keyser's retirement in 1924. She taught English, Dramatics, Public Speaking, and Latin courses at the school, and was the institution's bookkeeper as well. She was described as "dean and director" of the school's academic department in 1922. She founded and was administrator of Keyser Elementary School, part of the Bethune-Cookman College educational offerings.

While in New York, Keyser counted Hubert Harrison, and Paul Laurence Dunbar among her friends and colleagues. Keyser was active in the Brooklyn Equal Suffrage League, the YWCA, the National Association of Colored Women and the Northeastern Federation of Colored Women's Clubs, and first president of the Empire State Federation of Women's Clubs. She was on the first executive committee of the NAACP. In Florida, she was president of the State Federation of Colored Women's Clubs from 1915 to 1917.

== Personal life ==
Frances Reynolds Keyser was briefly married. She died in New York in 1932, aged about 70 years, after a decade of poor health.
