= If We Must Die =

Poem by Claude McKay

- by Claude McKay
- First published in: The Liberator
- Language: English
- Subject: Self-assertion under oppression
- Form: Sonnet
- Publication date: July 1919; 107 years ago

"If We Must Die" is a poem by Jamaican-American writer Claude McKay (1890–1948) published in the July 1919 issue of The Liberator magazine. McKay wrote the poem in response to mob attacks by white Americans upon African-American communities during the Red Summer. Although the poem does not specifically reference any group of people, it is reflecting the lynching nightmare black people were experiencing. It is considered one of McKay's most famous poems and was described by the poet Gwendolyn Brooks as one of the most famous poems of all time. “W. Churchill read it in a speech against the Nazis, and it was found on the body of an American soldier killed in action in 1944.”( J. H.Cone, 2011) It addresses the depth of Black people's despair in the face of white people choosing to stay silent while lynching was still going on in northern riots.

== Background ==
During the Red Summer, from late summer to early autumn 1919, there was a wave of anti-black attacks—at least twenty-five major "mob actions". In the attacks, hundreds of people were killed and thousands more were injured. James Weldon Johnson coined the term "Red Summer" to refer to the period.

Claude McKay was born in Jamaica in 1889. He moved to the United States in 1912, and after attending several schools, settled in New York City. He began to publish more poetry pseudonymously (having first published several collections in Jamaica). McKay's poetry was generally well received, particularly "To the White Fiends". Shortly after moving to New York, he met Max Eastman, the publisher of The Liberator magazine, and the two became friends.

== Writing and publication ==
If We Must Die

If we must die, let it be not like hogs
Hunted and penned in an inglorious spot,
While round us bark the mad and hungry dogs,
Making their mock at our accursed lot.

If we must die, O let us nobly die,
So that our precious blood may not be shed
In vain; then even the monsters we defy
Shall be constrained to honor us though dead!

O kinsmen! we must meet the common foe!
Though far outnumbered let us show us brave
And for their thousand blows deal one deathblow!
What though before us lies the open grave?

Like men we'll face the murderous, cowardly pack,
Pressed to the wall, dying, but fighting back!

McKay experienced the Red Summer personally, seeing violent mobs of white people while he worked for the Pennsylvania Railroad. He wrote "If We Must Die" in response to the events. The sonnet was first published in the July 1919 issue of The Liberator.

Frank Harris had sought to convince McKay to publish the poem in his Pearson's Magazine and was angry when it was not, telling McKay: "It belongs to me ... I gave you the inspiration to write that sonnet and I want to have the credit of publishing it." The poem was reprinted in The Messenger and the Workers' Dreadnought (London) later that year. It was widely reprinted in the years that followed.

== Analysis and reception ==
"If We Must Die" is one of McKay's most famous poems, and the poet Gwendolyn Brooks cited it as "one of the most famous poems ever written". According to Jordanian scholar Shadi Neimneh, the poem "arguably marks the beginning of the Harlem Renaissance because it gives expression to a new racial spirit and self-awareness". It has also been described as "the most renowned of the Harlem Renaissance sonnets" and the "inaugural address" of the Renaissance. Wallace Thurman considered the poem as embodying the essence of the New Negro movement as it was not aimed at arousing sympathy, but rather consisted of self-assertion. The scholar Jean Wagner cited the poem as inspirational to people experiencing persecution, writing that "[a]long with the will to resistance of black Americans that it expresses it voices also the will of oppressed people of every age who, whatever their race and wherever their region, are fighting with their backs against the wall to win their freedom."

Tonya Foster wrote that McKay's poem turned those who were persecuted into heroes and described it as a "call to arms for workers": by using "we" repeatedly, McKay extends his poem to whoever the poem reaches, and it is a nonspecific poem—there are no phrases tying it to a specific group or race—and can apply to any group under attack by "monsters we defy".

=== Structure ===
McKay wrote the poem as a Shakespearean sonnet, using an ABABCDCDEFEF rhyming pattern across three quatrains and ending with a "perfectly rhymed" couplet. The poem begins with eight lines written as conditional sentences (if/then) centered on "the inevitable death" of the subject. The next six lines are a separate section. By having three lines that are broken without any punctuation (three, six, and seven), McKay creates a sense of "immediacy, urgency". The sestet, or final six lines, provides a calmer and "controlled" resolution— each line ends with punctuation. The final line of the poem has two caesuras, or breaks in the phrase.

The scholar Robert A. Lee provided a close reading of the poem in CLA Journal. He noted that "If We Must Die" is structured to develop with imagery. It begins the subject being described as "hogs" who are "hunted" and "penned" by "animals". In the second quatrain, the animals have become "monsters" and the hogs are humanized with "precious" blood and the ability to "defy" the monsters. Here, instead of the hogs being penned, the monsters have been "constrained". In the third, the hogs have developed to "kinsmen" while the dogs are "common". The poem ends with a couplet where the subject is "men" and the monsters are a "murderous, cowardly pack". Those who are oppressed continue to fight although they realize they "must die".

== Legacy ==
Henry Cabot Lodge, a Republican member of the United States Senate from Massachusetts, is sometimes reported to have read read the poem to the United States Congress in 1919. Lodge allegedly intended the poem to serve as an example of "black radicalism". However, the scholar Lee M. Jenkins found no such reference.

Winston Churchill allegedly read the poem without attribution to the US Congress and later during The Blitz in World War II. Melvin B. Tolson wrote in a review of McKay's anthologized poetry that "[d]uring the last world war, Sir Winston Churchill snatched Claude McKay's poem 'If We Must Die', from the closet of the Harlem Renaissance, and paraded it before the House of Commons, as if it were the talismanic uniform of His Majesty's field marshal". Jenkins considers it unlikely Churchill actually read the poem to Congress and found no evidence that he ever quoted it.

Prisoners during the 1971 Attica Prison riot allegedly passed the poem's text around.

The poem was recited in the film August 28: A Day in the Life of a People, which debuted at the opening of the Smithsonian's National Museum of African American History and Culture in 2016.

Eric Robert Taylor wrote a book about insurrections during the Atlantic slave trade and titled it If We Must Die after the poem.

== See also ==
- "If I Must Die", 2023 poem by Refaat Alareer
