= Helen Williams (model) =

American model (1935–2023)

Helen Marie Williams Jackson (September 16, 1935 – July 26, 2023) was an American fashion model, and one of the first African American models to be featured in mainstream publications of her time.

== Career ==
Working as a stylist in a New York photographer's studio, Williams was discovered at age 17 by celebrity clients such as Lena Horne and Sammy Davis Jr.

Her career began as an exclusive model for magazines such as Ebony and Jet. However, the discrimination she faced in the United States as an African-American led her to relocate to France in 1960, where she found success modeling for designers such as Christian Dior and Jean Dessès. She returned to the U.S. in 1961 and despite initial roadblocks went on to be the face of major ad campaigns by brands such as Budweiser and Sears. She was one of the first clients of Ophelia DeVore's Grace De Marco modeling agency.

== Personal life and death ==
Helen Marie Williams was born in Burlington County, New Jersey on September 16, 1935.

Williams retired from modeling in 1970, but continued her career in fashion as a stylist. Helen also took up drawing and painting in her early model years which she continued long after her retirement. After a brief marriage to John Clayton Anderson some years earlier, she married Norm Jackson in 1977, whom she had met during her modeling days. They were married until his death in 2017.

Williams lived in East Riverton, New Jersey. She died from Alzheimer's disease at a care facility in nearby Moorestown, on July 26, 2023, at the age of 87.

== Legacy ==
Williams has been credited with helping to break down racial barriers in modeling. In 2004, she was the recipient of the Trailblazer Award by the Fashion & Arts Xchange organization at a ceremony at New York's Fashion Institute of Technology.
