= Theater companies of the Harlem Renaissance =

Theaters associated with the Harlem Renaissance

A number of theater companies are associated with the Harlem Renaissance.

== Lafayette Players (1916–1932) ==
Anita Bush, a pioneer in African American theater, began an acting company after seeing a show at the Lincoln Theater in Harlem. She wanted an all-Black group that performed Broadway plays, to combat the popular "racial stereotypes of African Americans as singers, dancers, and slapstick comedians." According to Bush, she wanted to prove that Blacks can do the same thing as whites. They were called the Bush Players. After performing at the Lincoln Theater for two years, the owner, Marie Downs, wanted to change their name to the Lincoln Players. Anita refused and took her company to the rival theater, The Lafayette Theatre.

In 1916, due to financial difficulties, Bush sold her company to the theater. One of the actors, Charles S. Gilpin, took over the players and helped establish the Lafayette Players Stock Company, which became the first legitimate Black stock company in Harlem. That same year Robert Levy, an American Jew, became involved with the Lafayette Players through the formation of the Quality Amusement Corporation, which managed both the theater and the acting troupe. Later, Levy used the talents of the players in the movies he produced. Reol Productions Corporation had a goal to product high-class pictures with colored actors, which created continuous employment for Black performers. The company consisted of only black actors who were cast as serious dramatic roles—something that was unheard of at the time. White playwrights, who intended to have white actors playing them, wrote many of these roles. This allowed serious black actors transcend the stereotyped and comedic roles, which they were normally expected to play. The Lafayette Players began performing for almost exclusively Black audiences. The plays they would perform were shows that were popular in the white theater repertory as well as the classics. Some examples of these are performances: Madame X, Dr. Jekyll and Mr. Hyde, and Shakespeare's Macbeth, which had been directed by Orson Welles. The Players performed anything that was being done on Broadway. They performed short plays, shortened versions of popular Broadway success'—most which were melodramatic. Sometimes they would perform musicals like Darktown and Shuffle Along. Some Harlem figures, like W. E. B. Du Bois, opposed this choice of materials because it did not promote the work of black playwrights.

By 1924, the Players were divided up into four different groups. The original cast stayed at the Lafayette Theater in Harlem. A new group was created in Chicago. Then two traveling groups formed—one that traveled throughout the South, and one along the East coast. These groups only played in theaters that allowed Black's. The groups, combined, performed over two hundred plays that had never been performed by a black cast. Their job was not only to make a point against the mainstream theater and society, but also to educate the Black audience around the country.

Some actors who were cast in the Lafayette Players: Edna Morton, Lawrence Chenault, Canada Lee, Rose McClendon, Oscar Micheaux, Lionel Monagas, Clarence Muse, and Charles S. Gilpin. The arranger James P. Johnson was involved for a while as well as the famous director Edgar Forrest. When the Depression started taking its toll, the performers were one of the first to get hit. In 1928, a white company bought the Players and relocated them to Los Angeles, California where they performed until 1932.

== Ida Anderson Players (1917–1928) ==
Ida Anderson got her start working for Anita Bush and after two years in the Lafayette Players she started her own players. The Ida Anderson Players got hired at the Lincoln Theater. The Anderson Players resided there until 1928, when Anderson was fired over a salary dispute. After her termination, the troupe was renamed The Lincoln Players.

== Negro Players (Hapgood Players) (1917) ==
When W. E. B. Du Bois saw a production of the Negro Players performing Ridgely Torrence's Three Plays for a Negro Theater in 1917, it influenced him to write, "The present spiritual production in the souls of Black folk is going to give American stage a drama that will lift it above silly songs and leg shows." Marie Jackson Stuart performed in the second playlet as Granny Maumee.

== Players' Guild (1919) ==
When the Circle for Negro War Relief had developed a branch in New York City, New York, they also established a theater company named the Players' Guild. The Players' Guild had several performances during the 1920s at the local Harlem YMCA. One of these productions helped the actor Paul Robeson rise to stardom. After the Guild made the YMCA their home, the place became a new venue for Black drama. The Guild was admired for creating a substitute from the cheap musical comedy and melodramatic works that were taking over Harlem theaters.

== Acme Players (1922–1924) ==
The Acme Players developed out of a performance by the National Urban League at the Lafayette Theater in 1922. In May 1923, under the direction of a white woman named Anne Wolter, the Players gave a performance at the Harlem YMCA. Here they performed two of Frank Wilson's short plays—A Train North and The Heartbreaker. When Wolter realized the Players' success, she developed the National Ethiopian Art Theater, which later became a school. Both, the Acme Players and the Ethiopian Art Theater furthered the three goals of creating a black theater, improve black actors, and performing black drama.

== National Ethiopian Art Theater (NEAT) (1924–1925) ==
The National Ethiopian Art Theater grew out of the success of the Acme Players. It was a short-lived cast and a school the encouraged playwriting and dramatic performances by African Americans. The teachers at the school included the organizers of the theater; Anne Wholter and Henry Creamer. The first public performance put on by NEAT was on June 19, 1924. The performance included choral singing and dance numbers. Another known performance of theirs was at the Lafayette Theater, where they performed three one-act plays; Cooped Up by Eloise Bibb Thompson, Being Forty by Eulalie Spence, and Bills. The school was disbanded in 1925.

== Krigwa Players Little Theater Group (1925–1928) ==
In 1925, W. E. B. Du Bois and Regina Anderson co-founded the Krigwa Players for the sole purpose of advancing African-American playwrights and practitioners. Du Bois wanted to create a theater that followed his belief of "for us, by us, near us, about us," which meant he wanted a troupe of black actors, performing pieces or shows written by Black playwrights. Krigwa, became an acronym for "Crisis Guild of Writers and Artists". When Krigwa was developed it was immediately affiliated with the NAACP, because of their importance on political theater. It was a way to communicate to the community new ideas and new messages, without the support of moneyed theatergoers and club owners. In the 1930s the group's impact was felt throughout the African-American community in Harlem and Baltimore, where they had built an extension group. In the summer of 1926, the Krigwa Players Little Negro Theater had found a home at the public library on 135th street with Du Bois as chairman of the group. Besides giving opportunities to actors, Krigwa held competitions with prizes for black dramatists. The prizes would sometimes include providing space for training and rehearsals, and put on productions that were intended to uplift and educate the audiences. In 1928 the Krigwa Players Little Theater Group dwindled and evolved into the "Negro Experimental Theatre"

== Aldridge Players (1926) ==
The Aldridge Players were a short-lived acting company that was formed by playwright Frank Wilson. He named them the Aldridge Players to pay tribute to the famous Shakespearean actor Ira Aldridge. Wilson formed the Players to present three of his one act plays: Sugar Cane, Flies, and Color Worship. The group became active in 1926, performed as guests of the Kringwa Players at the Harlem Library Little Theater. The company included: William Jackson, Agnes Marsh, Charlie Taylor, Charles Randolph, and Frank Wilson, who directed.

Another Aldridge Players company from St. Louis, Missouri, toured from 1927 to 1936 as part of the African-American little theater movement. Actor Frederick O'Neal organized that group with the help of the Saint Louis Urban League.

== Alhambra Players (1927–1931) ==
Before the 1920s, the Alhambra Theater only allowed Blacks to sit in the balcony and failed to pick up any Black acts. In 1920, the treasurer was arrested for not selling two Black men seats down in the orchestra. By 1925, Alhambra Theater catered to its Black audience members. One of its highlights was when the theater held a Harlem premiere of Blackbirds of 1926. It was a six-week engagement musical revue that was produced by Lew Leslie to show off the talents of Florence Mills. The show that followed, Blackbirds of 1928 starred Bill "Bojangles" Robinson. In May 1927, the Alhambra Theater introduced their new stock company—The Alhambra Players. They were briefly billed as All Star Colored Civic Repertory Company. Their first production was Goat Alley by the white playwright E. H. Culbertson. The company was known to perform nonracial shows, like The Cat and the Canary or Rain. In June 1927, the Alhambra Theater had to close down for a couple of months because of a lack of capital. They were only closed for two months, and reopened the house in August. The new Alhambra Players featured some actors from the Lafayette Players, like: Evelyn Preer, Charles H. Moore, Edward Thompson, J. Lawrence Criner, Susie Sutton, and Alice Gorgas. The Alhambra Players performed shows including: Norman Houston's The Panther, Why Women Cheat, The Temper, In the Underworld, The House of Lies, Mr. Squash Meets a Girl, Mighty Lak a Rose, The Ghost Returns, Carnival Girl and Monster Man. The company stayed active till 1931, when the theater transformed into a movie theater.

== Negro Experimental Theatre (Harlem Experimental Theatre (HET)) (1929–1934) ==
A very popular group called the Krigwa Players was a theater group founded in 1925 by W. E. B. Du Bois and Regina Anderson. The company was based in the 135th Street Public Library in Harlem, where Regina Anderson worked. Out of its ashes, emerged the Negro Experimental Theatre in 1929, founded by librarian Regina Anderson Andrews and teachers Dorothy Peterson. Others who helped establish the organization were critic Theophilus Lewis, playwright Jessie Redmon Fauset, and teacher Harold Jackman. This theater took place in the very same theater that its predecessor, the Krigwa Players utilized. The group continued to follow Du Bois's philosophy of African-American drama, that "The Negro Art Theatre should be (1) a theatre about us, (2) a theatre by us, (3) a theatre for us and (4) a theatre near us." It also aspired to continue where the old troupe left off, so they included as many of the founding members as possible. These members included Du Bois and Anderson of course, as well as Jessie Fauset, an African-American playwright, essayist, and educator, and prominent actress for the Harlem Renaissance. The Negro Experimental Theatre was not interested in mimicking professional theater, although they relied on professional actors and directors, and strove for high credits from Black critics and press. The group mixed itself more into society of Harlem, and kept to the idea of providing a public service and developing artists. When HET inherited the same library basement where the Krigwa Players performed, they focused on reaching out to the community, and collaborating with other races, and set up educational programs. Though it stood by Du Bois's 4 rules of black playwriting, the foundation was not focused on the exclusion of white work. In fact, according to A History of African American Theatre by Errol Hill and James V. Hatch, "HET also relied on white drama to fill its programs...Largely because they published their work."

The largest and most successful performance to come out of HET was Wade in the Water in 1929, starring prominent Harlem Renaissance actress Laura Bowman and teacher Dorothy Peterson. The play is based around an old folk song that stemmed from the fragmented stanzas, rhymes, melodic phrases, and spirituals of African People in the American diaspora, According to African-American hymnologist Melva Wilson Costen. The play itself tells the story of a slave woman ONA and her dying son, and their experience within the plantation culture that they live on. The play illustrates spirituality within the death of ONA's son and how his presence oscillates between life and death. HET became an inspirations to other little theater groups around the country, and encouraged serious Black theater and Black playwrights. The group performed the co-founder Regina Anderson's work—Climbing Jacob's Ladder and Underground.

== National Colored Players (1929) ==
Ida Anderson and her players reunited in 1929 to create a new company called the National Colored Players. NCP was one of the first theater troupes who allied with the new radical aesthetics. The Players usually showed showcases for revivals of past Broadway Hits. NCP moved into West End theatre and this is where they present three productions: Seven Heaven written by Audtin Strong, starring Ida Anderson, Vere E. Johns, George Randol, and J. Homer Tutt, Crime by Samuel Shipman and John Hymer, and The Gorilla by Harold Spence. All three shows were written by a white male playwright, and had successful runs with their shows on Broadway before bringing it to Harlem.

== Harlem Suitcase Theater (1938) ==
After working in the war, Langston Hughes came back to American and told Louise Patterson about his idea of a people's theater. She directed him to the International Workers Order on 125th street, which would become the home of the future Harlem Suitcase Theater. With Louise Thompson Patterson's assistance, Hughes' goal was to create "a group of proficient actors who would present productions for labor organizations." The mission statement that was created was about promoting interracial plays. Also mentioned in its constitution was creating a permanent repertory group that performed pieces dealing with lives, the problems, and hopes of Blacks and their relation to the American society. The theater and players got their name from its arena staging and lack of scenic properties. The name also implied that the productions would use as many props as could be packed in a suitcase. The stage was the first theater in the round in New York, so it was a training ground for all actors. Hughes intended to produce plays in a variety of styles and to provide entertainment. Hughes wrote most of the pieces that were performed there: The Slave, The Man Who Died At Twelve O'clock, or several skits that lampooned white caricatures of blacks: Em-Fueher Jones, Limitations of Life, and Little Eva's End. The program was made up of two or three skits followed by the resistance piece, Don't You Want To Be Free?, which became the longest running play in Harlem at the time. Paul Peters, Whittaker Chambers, Langston Hughes, and Jacob Burck all would serve as directors for this troupe. Other pieces that Hughes wrote included: Limitations of Life, The Em-Fuehrer Jones, Colonel Tom's Cabin, Hurrah, America! (subtitled Jersey City Justice), Scarlet Sister Barry, and Young As We Is. Some pieces he did in collaboration with his staff, which included Hilary Phillips, Powell Lindsay, Dorothy Peterson, and Louis Douglas. Besides and Hughes and the staff's work, people would send in their plays. The Theater also held training sessions directed by Hillary Phillips, which trained on theater technique. Summer of 1939, the season was under the directions of Thomas Richardson, it was during this period that Hughes had resigned from his position and theater all together. He left the Harlem Suitcase Theater for economic reasons, and from then on the two years of success slowly decreased. In the fall of 1939, the theater was relocated to the Harlem Branch Library. Here they performed productions such as: Don't You Want To Be Free?, Limitations of Life, Colonel Tom's Cabin (aka Little Eva's End), The Em-Fuehrer Jones, Hurrah, America!, Scarlet Sister Barry, and Young As We Is.
