= To the White Fiends =

Sonnet by Claude Mckay

To The White Fiends is a Petrarchan sonnet by Claude McKay. The Poetry Foundation describes it as one of McKay's most famous works from the late 1910s. In 2018 the scholar Timo Muller described it as "a pivotal text in the history of the black protest sonnet" and notes that it was McKay's first to reach a "wider audience". Léon Damas quoted part of the poem in his 1937 book of poetry Pigments. McKay, an immigrant to the United States, had written the poem the first year he spent in the nation in 1912. He sent an early draft of the poem to William Stanley Braithwaite, a Bostonian poetry editor in January 1916. The Crisis rejected the poem and it was not published until 1918 by Pearson's Magazine. In 1919 the poem was republished by The Liberator magazine.
