= Alice Wiley Seay =

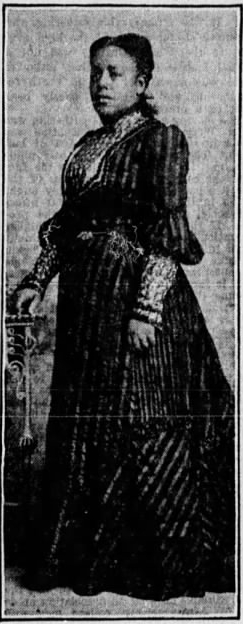
Alicey Wiley Seay in 1905.

Alice W. Wiley Seay (1858 – November 1937) was an American social worker and founder of the Empire State Federation of Women's Clubs. She was also involved in charity work through the Dorcas Society and women's clubs. She held leadership roles in many of these organizations.

== Biography ==
Seay was born in Giles, Virginia in 1858 and was most likely born into slavery. By 1880, Seay was no longer living in her family home and in June 1886, she married Pleasant Wiley. She and her husband moved to Brooklyn sometime after their marriage. Seay worked as a dressmaker and she and her husband had several tenants living in their home.

Seay became involved in clubs and raising money for the needy while she lived in Brooklyn. She began to do charity work through the Dorcas Home Missionary Society. Seay was president of the Dorcas Society in Brooklyn beginning in the late 1880s. In 1903, she became the vice president of the Northeastern Federation of Colored Women's Clubs (NFCWC), and in 1905, she was elected president of that group. In 1908, Seay founded the Empire State Federation of Women's Clubs (ESFWC). ESFWC was an affiliate of NFCWC and was involved in improving the lives of women and girls and also raising funds for the care of Harriet Tubman.

Seay's husband died in 1906 and Seay moved back to Virginia briefly. In 1910, Seay married James Alfred Seay. She moved back to Brooklyn for a few years where she again led the Dorcas society in Brooklyn. She also served on the board for the Mothers Day Nursery at the Lincoln Settlement.

Seay was involved in the temperance movement, dedicating a conference on the topic for the third annual meeting of the ESFWC. She was also a member of the Order of Tents and the Equal Suffrage League of Brooklyn.

In 1915 she was recorded as the chairman of the membership committee for the National Association for the Advancement of Colored People.

Seay returned to Virginia in 1916 where she was employed as a social worker and where her husband, James, had a farm. James died in 1932. Five years later, Seay died in Mattoax, Virginia in November 1937. She was buried at the Flower Hill Baptist Church in Giles, next to James. In February 1938, a memorial service for Seay was performed at the Concord Baptist Church. The service drew over 300 attendees.
