= Songs of Jamaica =

First book published in Jamaican Patois (1912)

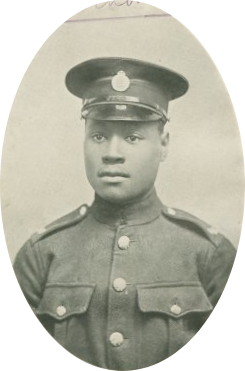
McKay as pictured in Songs of Jamaica, 1912

Songs of Jamaica is the first book published by the African-Jamaican writer Claude McKay, which appeared in January 1912. The Institute of Jamaica awarded McKay the Silver Musgrave Medal for this book and a second volume, Constab Blues, also published in 1912. He used the associated stipend to fund a trip to the United States of America.

The book was dedicated to Sir Sydney Olivier, who was at that time Governor of Jamaica, expressing admiration for Olivier's "sympathy for the black race". The collection was the first book-length publication of poetry in Patois by an African-Caribbean writer, and contained footnotes and an introduction by Walter Jekyll to aid readers unfamiliar with the dialect. In 1906 Jekyll had published Jamaican Song and Story: Annancy Stories, Digging Sings, Ring Tunes, and Dancing Tunes which celebrated the presence of African cultural elements in Jamaican vernacular culture.
