= Maria Perkins Lawton =

- Born: 1864
- Died: 1946 (aged 81–82)
- Education: Richmond Institute, Howard University
- Occupations: Organizer, lecturer
- Spouse: William Rufus Lawton (m. 1886–1944)

Maria Coles Perkins Lawton (April 30, 1864 – 1946) was a notable figure in the national women’s club movement of the early 20th century. She was the president of the Empire State Federation of Women's Clubs from 1916 to 1926.

== Biography ==
Lawton was born in Lynchburg, Virginia, on April 30, 1864. She attended Lynchburg High School, the Richmond Institute in Richmond, Virginia, and Howard University in Washington, DC.

In 1886 she married William Rufus Lawton, and they raised seven children. In 1892 the Lawtons moved to Brooklyn, New York. There, William pursued his career as a civil servant for New York City and also served as a Presbyterian minister at several churches in the New York/New Jersey area. Maria became a reporter for the Brooklyn newspaper, the Standard Union.

The couple were both active in the Brooklyn African-American community.

Lawton became active in the National Association of Colored Women's Clubs. She was a strong believer in organizing to improve the lives of African-American women and children.

With the passage of the Nineteenth Amendment, Lawson became involved with politics, specifically the League of Republican Colored Women.

Lawton was also involved in the labor movement in the 1920s. In 1924 she was the representative on the state of New York at the Labor Conference of Women.

Maria Perkins Lawton died in 1946, surviving her husband by two years.

== Legacy ==
She is the namesake of National Association of Colored Women's Clubs, Inc., NY affiliate, the Empire State Federation of Women’s Clubs Albany chapter, the "Maria C. Lawton Civic and Cultural Club", the oldest African American civic organization in Albany, NY. Mrs. Lawton was best known for her passion about servicing older adults, establishing the First Older Adult Center, Stuyvesant Center, which is now Maria Lawton Older Adult Club, in 1951. The Maria Lawton Older Adult Club is the FIRST African American older adult club and the OLDEST older adult club in Brooklyn, New York., which continues to provide older adults with social services, congregate meals, and recreational activity. Mrs. Lawton is remembered most of all for her tremendous contributions to the women's club movement, Brooklyn politics, and New York State politics.
