= Addie Wilkins Jackson =

American suffragist (1875-1938)

- Born: Addie Wilkins; 1875; Petersburg, Virginia, U.S.
- Died: December 7, 1938 (aged 62–63)

Addie Wilkins Jackson (1875 – December 7, 1938) was an American suffragist.

Jackson née Wilkins was born in Petersburg, Virginia, in 1875. Her family moved to New York State when she was a child. In the 1880s, she lived in the Brooklyn area and worked as a laundress and a housecleaner. In 1893, at the age of 18, she married Clarence Jackson, with whom she had five children. She was very close with her sister-in-law, Beatrice Jackson, and the two were involved in a number of the same political causes. Her class status had improved over the decades, and as her life stabilized she had more time to devote to activist causes. By the 1910s, Jackson lived in Tarrytown in Westchester County, where she was active in the suffrage movement and involved in many women's clubs. Notably she served as financial secretary of the Empire State Federation of Women's Clubs (ESFWC) from 1913 through 1920, after which she continued to be involved as an elected organizer. Jackson was instrumental in planning the Federation's first mid-winter conference in 1925.

At the time of World War I Jackson established a chapter of the American Red Cross in Tarrytown. Family records show that her Red Cross efforts were driven by the desire to make sure that the Harlem Hellfighters regiment received gifts made for them.

Jackson died of a heart attack on December 7, 1938.
