= Empire State Federation of Women's Clubs =

Empire State Federation of Women's Clubs logo

The Empire State Federation of Women's Clubs (ESFWC) was founded in 1908 and is an umbrella organization for African-American women's groups in New York. The organization worked to help improve the lives of young women and helped care for Harriet Tubman until her death in 1913. The organization was affiliated with the National Association of Colored Women's Clubs, and worked with the NAACP.

== About ==
Alice Wiley Seay founded the Empire State Federation of Women's Clubs (ESFWC) in Brooklyn in August 1908. The first convention took place at the Bethel A.M.E. Church in New York City in July 1909. The organization has created educational endowments. In 1933, they formed the Empire State Association of Youth Clubs for black girls.

The organization also saw that Harriet Tubman, who was living in poverty in the Tubman Home, would need continuing donations to support her care in her old age. The ESFWC was sending Tubman $25 a month for expenses, which supplemented the $20 a month she received as a pension. Tubman's expenses came to around $40 a month. The club has continued to honor Tubman's memory in various ways. In 1915, the group created a monument designed by Mrs. Jackson Stewart at Tubman's grave. In 1974, the ESFWC paid tribute to Tubman at their annual convention, and over 300 women attending the convention visited the Tubman home.

== Notable members ==
- Mary Frances Gunner (president)
- Frances Reynolds Keyser (president)
- Maria Perkins Lawton (president 1916–1926)
- Addie Wilkins Jackson (financial secretary 1913-1920)
