= Ophelia DeVore =

American businesswoman, publisher, and model (1922–2014)

- Born: August 12, 1921; Edgefield, South Carolina, U.S.
- Died: February 28, 2014 (aged 91); New York City
- Education: Hunter College High School; New York University
- Occupations: model, entrepreneur, publisher
- Known for: The Grace Del Marco Agency
- Spouse(s): Harold Carter; Vernon Mitchell

Ophelia DeVore (August 12, 1921 – February 28, 2014) was an American businesswoman, publisher, and model. She was the first model of African-American descent in the United States. In 1946, she helped establish the Grace Del Marco Agency, one of the first modeling agencies in America.

== Early life and education ==
Emma Ophelia DeVore was born on August 12, 1922, in Edgefield, South Carolina. She was one of ten children born to John Walter DeVore and Mary Emma Strother giving Devore a mixed ancestry of German-American, African-American, and Cherokee. Her father owned a road contracting business and her mother was an educator and musician. Her father mentored her in communicating well with people, as her mother stressed proper education, appearance, and etiquette.

DeVore attended segregated schools until she was nine, and then moved to Winston-Salem to live with her mother's brother, John. Two years later, she moved to New York City, where she lived with a relative, and her move north prevented any future educational interruptions due to her father's travel schedule.

DeVore graduated from Hunter College High School and went on to New York University. There, she majored in mathematics and minored in languages.

== Career ==
=== The Grace Del Marco Agency ===
Ophelia DeVore began modeling at the age of 16. As a fair-skinned person of African-American descent, DeVore could "pass" for Norwegian and gain contracts throughout Europe. In 1946, determined to create a new market for non-White women in the U.S., DeVore established The Grace Del Marco Agency.

In the agency's early days, it was a stepping stone for countless household names; Diahann Carroll, Helen Williams, Richard Roundtree, Cicely Tyson and others. Racism was rampant in New York's fashion business and the Grace Del Marco Agency was one of the few places non-White models could gain work.

Her agency's shows took place in churches, college campuses, and in the ballrooms of the Diplomat and Waldorf-Astoria hotels. Like many non-Whites in the mid-twentieth century, DeVore's breakthrough came in Europe; specifically through the French fashion world.

The initial impact took place at many of the Cannes Film Festivals during the 1950s and 1960s. DeVore also seized media for business equity by co-hosting ABC's Spotlight on Harlem. Her intensity to "make it" demanded relentless dedication and work ethic; enough to cause her a heart attack while still in her twenties.

In the agency's later years, it was renamed Ophelia DeVore Associates, and then the Ophelia DeVore Organization. In 1985, DeVore broadened her enterprise globally to include Swaziland as a client, and published her late husband's newspaper The Columbus Times.

=== Publishing ===
DeVore was the CEO and publisher of The Columbus Times newspaper in Columbus, Georgia, a Black newspaper which she ran from the 1970s until retiring in 2009. After her retirement, DeVore's daughter, Carol Carter Gertjegerdes became publisher, until her retirement in 2015. The current publisher of the newspaper is Ms DeVore's granddaughter.

=== Activism and philosophy ===
DeVore always maintained a role as activist for non-White inclusion in the fashion industry and creating universally inclusive concepts designed for excellence.

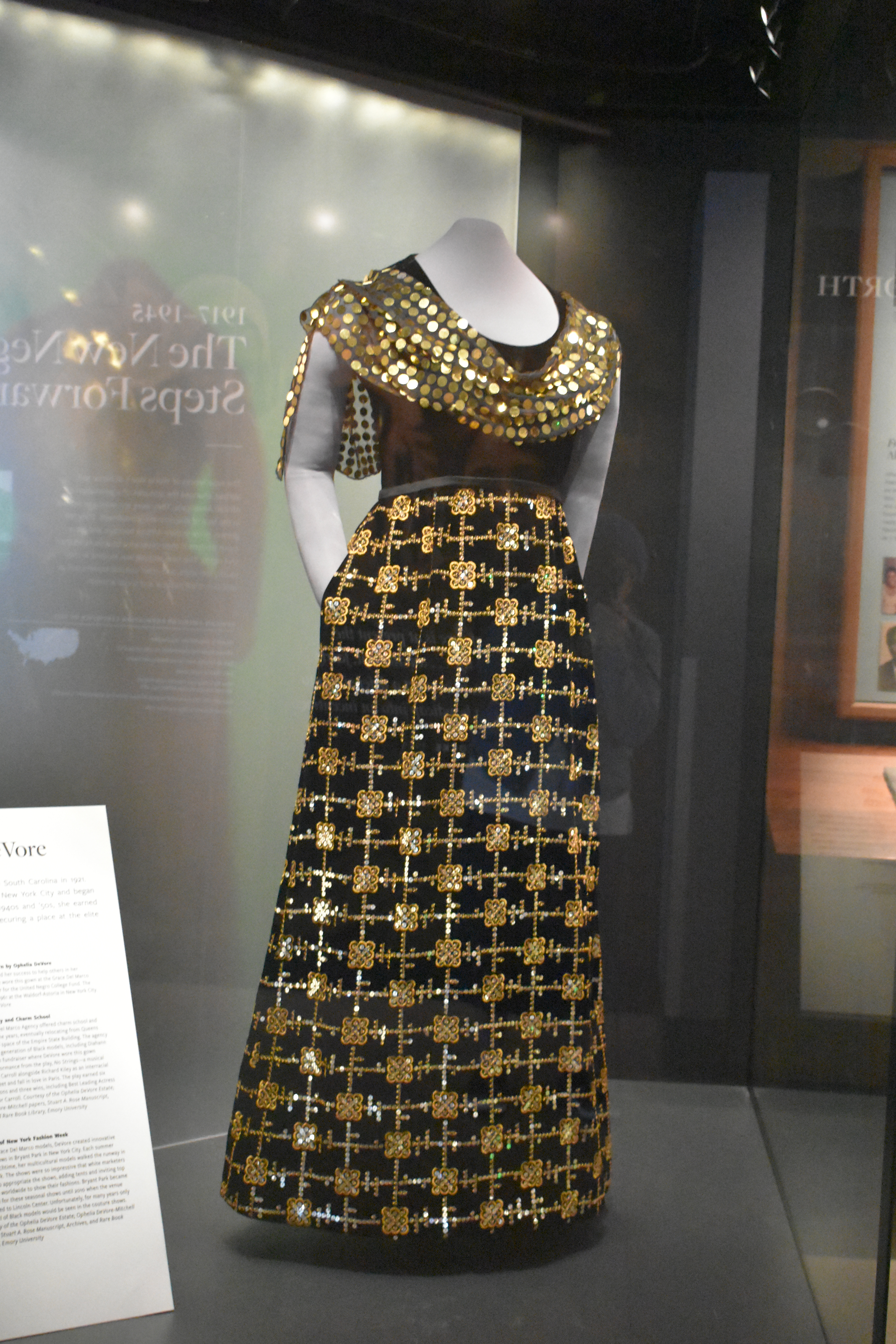
Evening dress designed by Ophelia DeVore as seen in the Smithsonian Museum of African American History and Culture

=== Honors and recognition ===
In 1989, she was featured in Brian Lanker's I Dream a World, a collection of portraits and biographies of black women who helped change America.

In 2004, along with Wesley Tann, she was honored by the Fashion Institute of Technology and the Fashion Arts Xchange, Inc. for her contributions to fashion and entertainment.

== Personal life ==
In 1941, she married Harold Carter. He worked as a firefighter while she studied fashion, public relations, and advertising. Together, they had five children.

DeVore married Vernon Mitchell in 1968, who died in 1972.

== Death ==
She died on February 28, 2014, in Manhattan, aged 92.
