= Romance in Marseille =

Novel by Claude McKay

- First edition
- Author: Claude McKay
- Language: English
- Publisher: Penguin Classics
- Publication date: February 4, 2020
- Publication place: United States

Romance in Marseille is a novel by Claude McKay. The novel was published posthumously in 2020, 87 years after it was written, as the original editors deemed it too transgressive for its time. It is McKay's second posthumously published novel in recent years.

It follows the story of Lafala, a black sailor who becomes wealthy after winning a lawsuit against a shipping line for the mistreatment he experiences as a stowaway. The novel is partly based on the real-life experiences of Nelson Simeon Dede, a Nigerian sailor McKay had met in Marseille.

== Publication history ==
Building on his second novel, Banjo: A Story Without a Plot (1929), McKay began composing what would become Romance in Marseille in September 1929, initially calling it "The Jungle and the Bottoms." He set aside the manuscript following debates with his agent and publisher, taking it up again in 1932 and renaming it "Savage Loving." However, McKay ultimately abandoned the project in 1933 amid the Great Depression, leaving the work in its most complete form and with the final title, Romance in Marseille. The novel was posthumously published in 2020 by Penguin, edited by Gary Edward Holcomb and William J. Maxwell. They note that "Romance is not a long-lost, now-recovered text [. . .] two hand-corrected typescript versions of Romance have been available to researchers. A truncated draft is kept in the collection of the Beinecke Rare Book and Manuscript Library at Yale University, while the lengthier, complete, and final version is held at the Schomberg Center for Research in Black Culture in Harlem." Notwithstanding, the novel's significance was certainly lost on most modernist critics, as well as the publishing industry, and these factors limited public access to the novel for nearly a century.

== Synopsis ==
The story opens on Lafala in a hospital in New York after his legs have been amputated. Readers learn that he is a sailor from English West Africa, and that he had been forced to stow away on a liner after a prostitute named Aslima robs him. After he is caught by the shipping line and imprisoned in a freezing "bunker" (a WC), his legs become frostbitten and must later be amputated. After a lawyer hears about Lafala's case and encourages him to sue the shipping line for mistreatment, Lafala wins a massive legal payout and is catapulted into wealth. He acquires prosthetic legs and returns to Marseille.

Upon his return, Lafala again pursues a relationship with Aslima despite her betrayal. He is now one of the wealthy patrons of the port city, but his affair also leads to tension between Aslima and her pimp, as well as further troubles with the authorities. Seeking retribution, the shipping line conspires with the French police to jail Lafala for "stowing away for profit." While Lafala is later freed, he becomes cynical and determines to return to his native home in West Africa. Though he initially invites Aslima to return to West Africa with him, Lafala ultimately leaves her. At the end of the novel, Aslima is killed in a fight with her jealous pimp: "He shot the remaining bullets into her body, cursing and calling upon hell to swallow her soul."

== Themes ==
The novel explores disability, the legacy of black diaspora, and queer identity. A major portion of the narrative revolves around Lafala's disability and the "Pyrrhic victory" associated with the lawsuit: he is made "whole" with the loss of his limbs, but he questions whether money can ever truly compensate for his disability. Additionally, the transport and mistreatment of black bodies across the Atlantic is a topic that returns repeatedly throughout the novel, emphasizing the specter of slave trading in Western culture. Several of the characters are openly queer in the novel as well, including Big Blonde, which is likely one reason the text was viewed as "too transgressive" for publication in the 1930s.

There are also some anti-Semitic undertones in the novel, such as the portrayal of the Jewish lawyer (an ambulance-chaser): "I'm not here to listen to a lecture from you, Mr. Jew. You did wring that money out of the company alright—to get your big share."

== Accolades ==
The book was called "the best new novel" by Vulture in February 2020, named a New York Times book of the week, and an Editors' Choice Pick in the NYT Book Review.
