= Dorothy Randolph Peterson =

American actress

Dorothy Randolph Peterson (June 21, 1897 – November 4, 1978) was an American teacher and actress who played an important role in the Harlem Renaissance through her efforts to promote and preserve the achievements of African-American artists.

== Biography ==
Dorothy Randolph Peterson was born in Brooklyn, New York to Jerome Peterson and Cornelia S. White. She had a younger brother named Sydney Peterson. Peterson spent much of her childhood in Puerto Rico, due to her father's work as the U.S. Consul to Puerto Cabello, Venezuela. After attending university in Puerto Rico, she attended New York University and moved to Harlem in the 1920s. There, she engaged in the artistic community by hosting literary salons, as an early patron of Fire!! -- A Quarterly Devoted to the Younger Negro Artists, and as co-founder of the Negro Experimental Theater in 1929 with Regina Anderson. Her efforts to preserve African-American art and culture culminated with her founding of the James Weldon Johnson Memorial Collection of Negro Arts and Letters at Yale University and the Jerome Bowers Peterson Collection of Photographs of Celebrated Negroes at Wadleigh High School in Harlem.
