= Hanover Parish Church, Lucea =

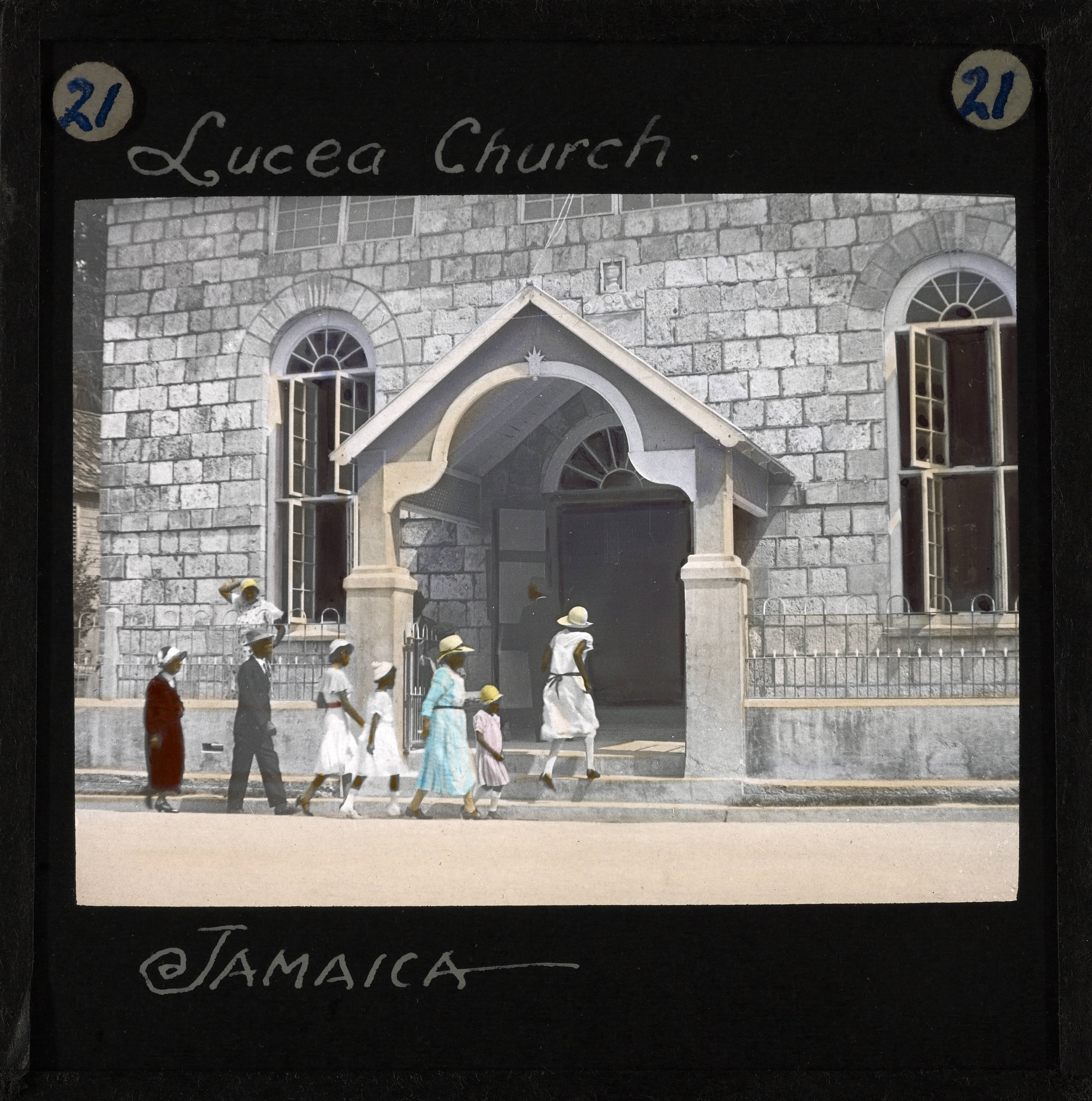
Members of the Congregation entering Lucea Church, Jamaica, early 20th century

Hannover Parish Church, Lucea is the parish church of Hanover, Jamaica. It was built in Lucea, Jamaica in 1725, with the first baptism that year, and the first burial in 1727.

Daniel Warner Rose was rector of the church from 1806 to 1824.
