= White Rose Mission =

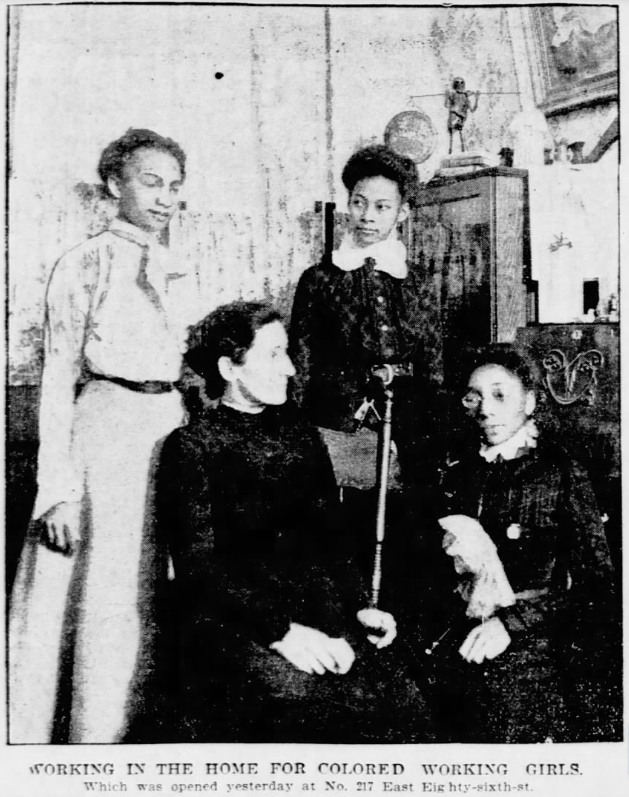
The opening of the White Rose Mission's new building, 1902

The White Rose Mission (also known as the White Rose Home for Colored Working Girls and the White Rose Industrial Association) was created on February 11, 1897 in Manhattan, New York. The mission was founded by two African American activists, Victoria Earle Matthews and Maritcha Remond Lyons, as a place where women could become acclimated to new life in the North after migrating from the South, later becoming a place for working girls. It was founded to offer refuge, shelter and food for the newly arrived African American women whom traveled from the southern states of the US.

Throughout the years the mission underwent many changes with leadership, property, and allocating different programs to combat each issue women in the North were facing. The mission influenced various other organizations to help those in need and placed thousands of African American women and girls in safe homes. By 1915, many more organizations that focused on helping African Americans, were developed. As the population of members grew, the founders needed to expand and invest in more property to house everyone and obtain a larger space to conduct meetings.

When the mission first opened in 1897, it was located at 217 East 86th Street. In 1918, The Mission moved to 262 West 136th Street from eighty sixth street after a spike in migrating individuals in New York, continuing the same programs and community work.

== Influence ==
Though the women were escaping from the South to the North in hopes of a better life, the North continued to be struck by various issues. The migrants faced limited employment opportunities, inadequate housing, grinding poverty, racial prejudice and racially motivated violence. Founded to offer shelter and food to destitute migrants, The White Rose Mission also offered job placement for the new arrivals. As African American workers were relegated to jobs as unskilled laborers, conditions and opportunities for African American female workers in New York City were deplorable. In 1898 a girl that was seeking help from the mission was lured away by a white male while she was migrating from Florida. This led the Matthews and members of the mission to become more cautious of the risks that women could be exposed to. After the incident, at Manhattan's piers, docks and railway stations, volunteers offered assistance to female travelers who often fell prey to these unscrupulous employment agents and con artists.

The mission helped women find homes until 1902 when it was able to provide adequate housing to many individuals for $1.25 a week. The aim of the employment placement service of the White Rose Mission was to furnish skilled, circumspect domestic workers to middle-class homes. The Mission also offered instruction in aspects of housekeeping, such as: cooking, sewing, expert waiting and laundering. In addition, trade and other profession courses. The mission also helped many younger girls by taking them on outings where they were able to learn useful skills. The mission was well known and many helped to donate furniture and supplies for classrooms. It also provided a library of works relevant to the history and accomplishments of African and African American people. This coincided well with the literature and history classes that were available. The mission's library included a 1773 edition of the poems of Phillis Wheatley, an 1859 volume of the Anglo-African Magazine and a first edition of An Appeal in Favor of that Class of Americans Called Africans by Lydia Maria Child, which were all considered to be few of the most unusual and important early collections of special materials about African American individuals.

== Victoria Earle Matthews ==
Victoria Earle Matthews was an African American woman who had a long history in activism. She was born enslaved, but was rescued by her mother who had escaped shortly after Matthews was born. Raised in New York City, Matthews began her work in activism as a journalist. Before founding the mission, Matthews, among other African American women, started the Woman's Loyal Union in 1892 in support of preventing lynching in the US. Also, becoming the organizer of the National Association of Colored Women in the mid 1890's. She then created the mission after the death of her son in 1895 due to the loneliness that became of her after his passing. She spoke in the Hampton Negro Conference in 1898 where she described the many hardships individuals were encountering in the North. She conducted detailed research into the working conditions of young African American women often by passing as a white person to obtain information on schemes and organized rings. She found that many women were being corrupted by white individuals for work and many ended up in sex work due to limited resources. She strove to help support the women by allocating resources therefore they could work and live in a safer environment.

== Maritcha Remond Lyons ==
Maritcha Remond Lyons was not only a founder of the mission but also a teacher due to her history in education. Though Maritcha was born free in New York, she had to work hard to fight for her education and to later create a career in teaching. Lyons's father, Albro Lyons, opened many practices where she was able to learn various skills. Her family was a part of the Underground Railroad system to help many escape from slavery. She was the first black individual to go to an all-white school in Rhode Island. Her family had helped over a thousand escape slavery. Throughout her early childhood and teen years, she was surrounded by activists. Along with her parents work, her godfather, Dr. James McCune Smith started an interracial medical practice. Frederick Douglass, the famous abolitionist, was her great uncle. Once Lyons moved to Providence after being on the run after her family's fear of exposure, she became the first African American individual to graduate Providence High School in May of 1869. At first she was not allowed to attend an all white school but her case was brought to the Rhode Island Legislature, and after much debate she was permitted. Due to her race she had to undergo various tests before she could begin her high school education. Once she graduated she became a teacher to help children like her, and later helped to found the White Rose Mission to continue her work in education.

== Other key figures ==
In 1907, after Matthew's passing, Frances Keyser became the leader of the mission until 1912. Many other influential activists played a part in enhancing programs of the mission. In 1908, the founder of the "New Negro Movement" a social activism movement that worked close with many other organizations, Hubert Harrison, offered classes focused on the history of race. Harrison was a writer, orator, educator, critic and political activist who also helped to organize a literary club at the White Rose Home, delivered lectures on post-war Reconstruction, and took charge of the Home's Boys Club. In addition, Matthews has formed a friendship with Booker T. Washington who was able to gain support from white benefactors to help donate to the mission. Washington continued to be a supporter of the mission which helped spread the word of the importance and resources it gave.
