= Claude McKay =

Jamaican American writer and poet (1890–1948)

The Honourable Claude McKay OJ
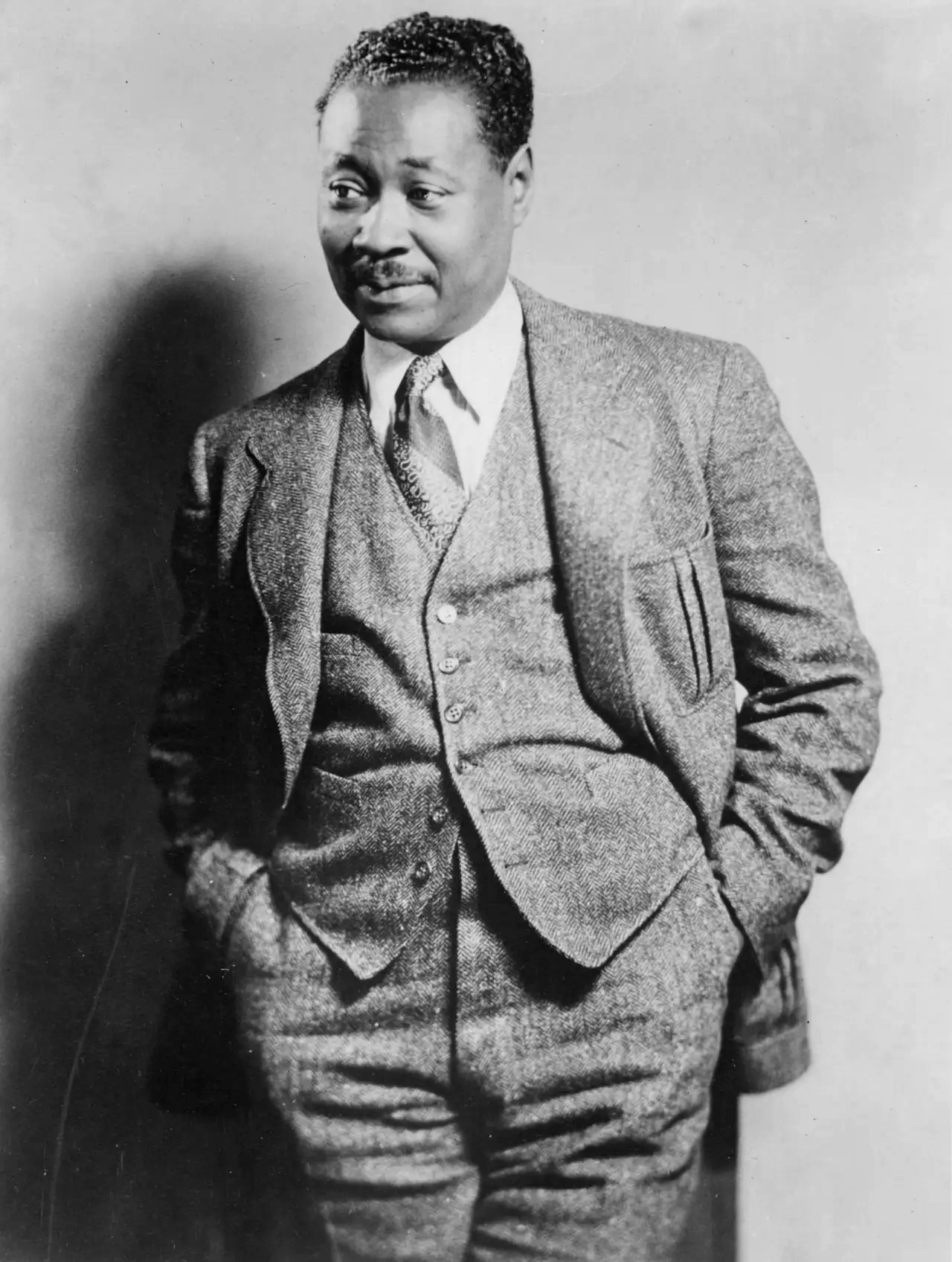
- Born: Festus Claudius McKay; September 15, 1890; Clarendon, Colony of Jamaica, British Empire
- Died: May 22, 1948 (aged 57); Chicago, Illinois, U.S.
- Education: Kansas State College, Tuskegee Institute
- Occupations: Writer, poet, journalist
- Writing career
- Language: English
- Period: Harlem Renaissance
- Notable works: Songs of Jamaica (1912); "If We Must Die" (1919); Harlem Shadows (1922); Home to Harlem (1928); A Long Way from Home (1937)
- Notable awards: Harmon Gold Award

Festus Claudius "Claude" McKay OJ (September 15, 1890 – May 22, 1948) was a Jamaican-American writer and poet. He was a central figure in the Harlem Renaissance.

Born in Jamaica, McKay first travelled to the United States to attend college, and encountered W. E. B. Du Bois's The Souls of Black Folk which stimulated McKay's interest in political involvement. He moved to New York City in 1914 and, in 1919, he wrote "If We Must Die", one of his best known works, a widely reprinted sonnet responding to the wave of white-on-black race riots and lynchings following the conclusion of the First World War.

McKay also wrote five novels, Home to Harlem (1928), a best-seller that won the Harmon Gold Award for Literature, Banjo (1929), Banana Bottom (1933), Harlem Glory (written in 1938–1940, published in 1990), Amiable With Big Teeth: A Novel of the Love Affair Between the Communists and the Poor Black Sheep of Harlem (written in 1941, published in 2017), and a novella, Romance in Marseille (written in 1933, published in 2020).

Besides these novels and four published collections of poetry, McKay also authored a collection of short stories, Gingertown (1932); two autobiographical books, A Long Way from Home (1937) and My Green Hills of Jamaica (published posthumously in 1979); and Harlem: Negro Metropolis (1940), consisting of eleven essays on the contemporary social and political history of Harlem and Manhattan, concerned especially with political, social and labor organizing. His 1922 poetry collection, Harlem Shadows, was among the first books published during the Harlem Renaissance and his novel Home To Harlem was a watershed contribution to its fiction. His Selected Poems was published posthumously, in 1953. His Complete Poems (2004) includes almost ninety pages of poetry written between 1923 and the late 1940s, most of it previously unpublished, a crucial addition to his poetic oeuvre.

McKay was introduced to British Fabian socialism in his teens by his elder brother and tutor Uriah Theodore, and after moving to the United States in his early 20s he encountered the American socialist left in the work of W. E. B. Du Bois and through his membership in the Industrial Workers of the World (IWW) — the only American left-labor organization of the era that was totally open to Black members (as he comments), continuing the tradition of the populist People's Party of the previous generation. In the course of the teens he became acquainted with the writings of Marx and the programs of a variety of activists. As a co-editor of The Liberator magazine, he came into conflict with its hard-line Leninist doctrinaire editor Mike Gold, a contention which contributed to his leaving the magazine. In 1922–1923, he traveled to the Soviet Union to attend a Congress of the International, there encountering his friend Liberator publisher Max Eastman, a delegate to the Congress. In Russia, McKay was widely feted by the Communist Party. While there, he worked with a Russian writer to produce two books which were published in Russian, The Negroes of America (1923), a critical examination of American black-white racism from a Marxist class-conflict perspective, and Trial By Lynching (1925); translations of these books back into English appeared in 1979 and 1977 respectively; McKay's original English texts are apparently lost. In the Soviet Union, McKay eventually concluded that, as he says of a character in Harlem Glory, he "saw what he was shown." Realizing that he was being manipulated and used by the Party apparatus, and responding critically to the authoritarian bent of the Soviet regime, he left for Western Europe in 1923, first for Hamburg, then Paris, then the South of France, Barcelona and Morocco.

After his return to Harlem in 1934, he found himself in frequent contention with the Stalinist New York City Communist Party which sought to dominate the left politics and writing community of the decade. His prose masterpiece, A Long Way From Home, was attacked in the New York City press on doctrinaire Stalinist grounds. This conflict is reflected in Harlem: Negro Metropolis and satirized in Amiable With Big Teeth. His sonnet sequence, "The Cycle," published posthumously in the Complete Poems, deals at length with McKay's confrontation with the left political machine of the time. Increasingly ill in the mid-40s, he was rescued from extremely impoverished circumstances by a Catholic Worker friend and installed in a communal living situation; later in the decade, he converted to Catholicism and died in 1948.

== Biography ==
=== Early life in Jamaica ===
Festus Claudius McKay, known as Claude McKay, was born September 15, 1890, in Nairne Castle near James Hill in upper Clarendon Parish, Jamaica. He referred to his home village as Sunny Ville, a name given to the area by locals. He was the youngest child of Thomas Francis McKay and Hannah Ann Elizabeth Edwards, well-to-do farmers who had enough property to qualify to vote. He had seven siblings. McKay's parents were active and well-respected members of the Baptist faith. Thomas was a strict, religious man who struggled to develop close relationships with his children due to his serious nature. In contrast, Hannah had a warmth that allowed her to give love freely to all of her children. Thomas was of Ashanti descent, while Hannah traced her ancestry to Madagascar. Claude recounted that his father would often share stories of Ashanti customs with the family.

At the age of four, McKay went to school at Mt. Zion Church. Around the age of nine, he was sent to live with his oldest brother, Uriah Theodore, also known as Theo, a teacher, to be given a proper education. His brother was also an amateur journalist. Due to his brother's influence, McKay became an avid reader of classical and British literature, as well as philosophy, science, and theology. In his free time, he would read poems, including Shakespeare. He started writing poetry of his own at the age of 10.

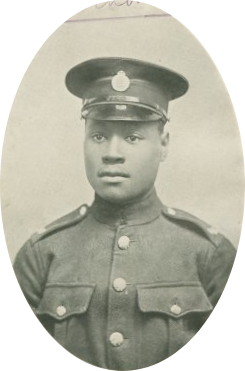
McKay as pictured in Songs of Jamaica, 1912

As a teenager in 1906, he became apprenticed to a carriage and cabinet maker known as Old Brenda, maintaining his apprenticeship for about two years. During that time, in 1907, McKay met Walter Jekyll, a philosopher and folklorist, who became a mentor and an inspiration for him, who also encouraged him to concentrate on his writing. Jekyll convinced McKay to write in his native dialect, and set some of McKay's verses to music. Jekyll helped McKay publish his first book of poems, Songs of Jamaica, in 1912. They were the first poems published in Jamaican Patois, a dialect of mainly English words and Twi (Ghanaian language) structure. McKay's next volume, Constab Ballads (1912), was based on his experiences of joining the constabulary for a brief period in 1911.

In the poem "The Tropics in New York", McKay reminisced about the Caribbean. The poem is set in New York and was written while McKay lived there as a laborer. The fruits he sees in New York make the speaker of the poem long for Jamaica, and thus Caribbean fruits are imagined as part of the New York cityscape. The colors of the fruit remind him of the colors and diversity in his native island and "hungry for old familiar ways / a wave of longing through my body wept".

=== First stay in the U.S. ===
McKay left for the U.S. in 1912 to attend Tuskegee Institute (now Tuskegee University). He was shocked by the intense racism he encountered when he arrived in Charleston, South Carolina, where many public facilities were segregated; this inspired him to write more poetry. At Tuskegee, he disliked the "semi-military, machine-like existence" and quickly left to study at Kansas State Agricultural College (now Kansas State University). At Kansas State, he read W. E. B. Du Bois' The Souls of Black Folk, which had a major impact on him and stirred his political involvement. Despite his superior academic performance, in 1914, he decided he did not want to be an agronomist and moved to New York City, where he married his childhood sweetheart Eulalie Imelda Lewars. However, after only six months of marriage, his wife returned to Jamaica, where their daughter Ruth was born. McKay would never meet his daughter. As detailed in the Chronology of Gene Andrew Jarrett's 2007 edition of A Long Way From Home, during this period (1914–1919) McKay first managed a Brooklyn restaurant, which failed, next worked as a waiter at a hotel in Hanover, New Hampshire, then at a Manhattan women's club, and longest and most happily as a waiter on the Pennsylvania Railroad.

McKay published two poems in 1917 in The Seven Arts under the pseudonym Eli Edwards. In 1918 McKay met Frank Harris, then editor of Pearson's Magazine. His avowal of writerly integrity had a lifelong effect for McKay, as he relates in his memoir, A Long Way From Home. Harris featured four poems and a short prose piece about his biography and poetics, in the September 1918 issue of the magazine, McKay's first prominent appearance in print. In 1919, McKay met Crystal and Max Eastman, publishers of The Liberator magazine, where McKay would serve as co-executive editor until 1922. As co-editor of The Liberator, he published one of his most famous poems, "If We Must Die", during the "Red Summer", a period of intense racial violence against black people in Anglo-American societies.

In this period McKay joined the Industrial Workers of the World (IWW). He also became involved with a group of black radicals who were unhappy both with Marcus Garvey's nationalism and the middle-class reformist NAACP. These included other Caribbean writers such as Cyril Briggs, Richard B. Moore, and Wilfred Domingo. They fought for black self-determination within the context of socialist revolution. Together they founded a semi-secret revolutionary organization, the African Blood Brotherhood. Hubert Harrison had asked McKay to write for Garvey's Negro World, but only a few copies of the paper have survived from this period, none of which contain any articles by McKay. In early fall 1919 McKay traveled to London, perhaps prompted by pressure from the Justice Department which was engaged in a nationwide attack on pacifists, socialists and labor organizers (the "Palmer Raids") which especially targeted the IWW.

=== Sojourn in the United Kingdom ===
In London, McKay moved in socialist and literary circles; he frequented two clubs, a soldiers' club in Drury Lane, and the International Socialist Club in Shoreditch. A militant atheist, he also joined the Rationalist Press Association, who had published two of Walter Jekyll's books. It was during this period that his commitment to socialism deepened and he read Marx assiduously. At the International Socialist Club, McKay met Shapurji Saklatvala, A. J. Cook, Guy Aldred, Jack Tanner, Arthur McManus, William Gallacher, Sylvia Pankhurst, and George Lansbury. McKay was soon invited to write for Pankhurst's magazine, Workers' Dreadnought.

In April 1920, the Daily Herald, a socialist paper published by George Lansbury, included a racist article written by E. D. Morel. Entitled "Black Scourge in Europe: Sexual Horror Let Loose by France on the Rhine", it insinuated gross hypersexuality in black people in general. Lansbury refused to print McKay's response, so McKay did so in Workers' Dreadnought, writing:

Why this obscene maniacal outburst about the sex vitality of black men in a proletarian paper? Rape is rape; the colour of the skin doesn't make it different. Negroes are no more over-sexed than Caucasians; mulatto children in the West Indies and America were not the result of parthenogenesis. If Negro troops had syphilis, they contracted it from the white and yellow races. As for German women, in their economic plight, they were selling themselves to anyone. I do not protest because I happen to be a Negro... I write because I feel that the ultimate result of your propaganda will be further strife and blood-spilling between whites and the many members of my race... who have been dumped down on the English docks since the ending of the European war... Bourbons of the United States will thank you, and the proletarian underworld of London will certainly gloat over the scoop of the Christian-Socialist pacifist Daily Herald.

Since January 1920, McKay had been involved with the Workers' Dreadnought and the Workers' Socialist Federation, a council communist group active in the East End with a majority of women at all levels of the organization. He became a paid journalist for the paper. He worked closely with the Finnish Bolshevik Erkki Veltheim. He attended the Communist Unity Conference that established the Communist Party of Great Britain. At this time he also had some of his poetry published in the Cambridge Magazine, edited by C. K. Ogden.

When Sylvia Pankhurst was arrested under the Defence of the Realm Act for publishing articles "calculated and likely to cause sedition among His Majesty's forces, in the Navy, and among the civilian population," McKay's rooms were subjected to a thorough search. He is likely to have been the author of "The Yellow Peril and the Dockers" attributed to "Leon Lopez", which was one of the articles cited by the government in its case against Workers' Dreadnought.

=== Trip to Russia ===
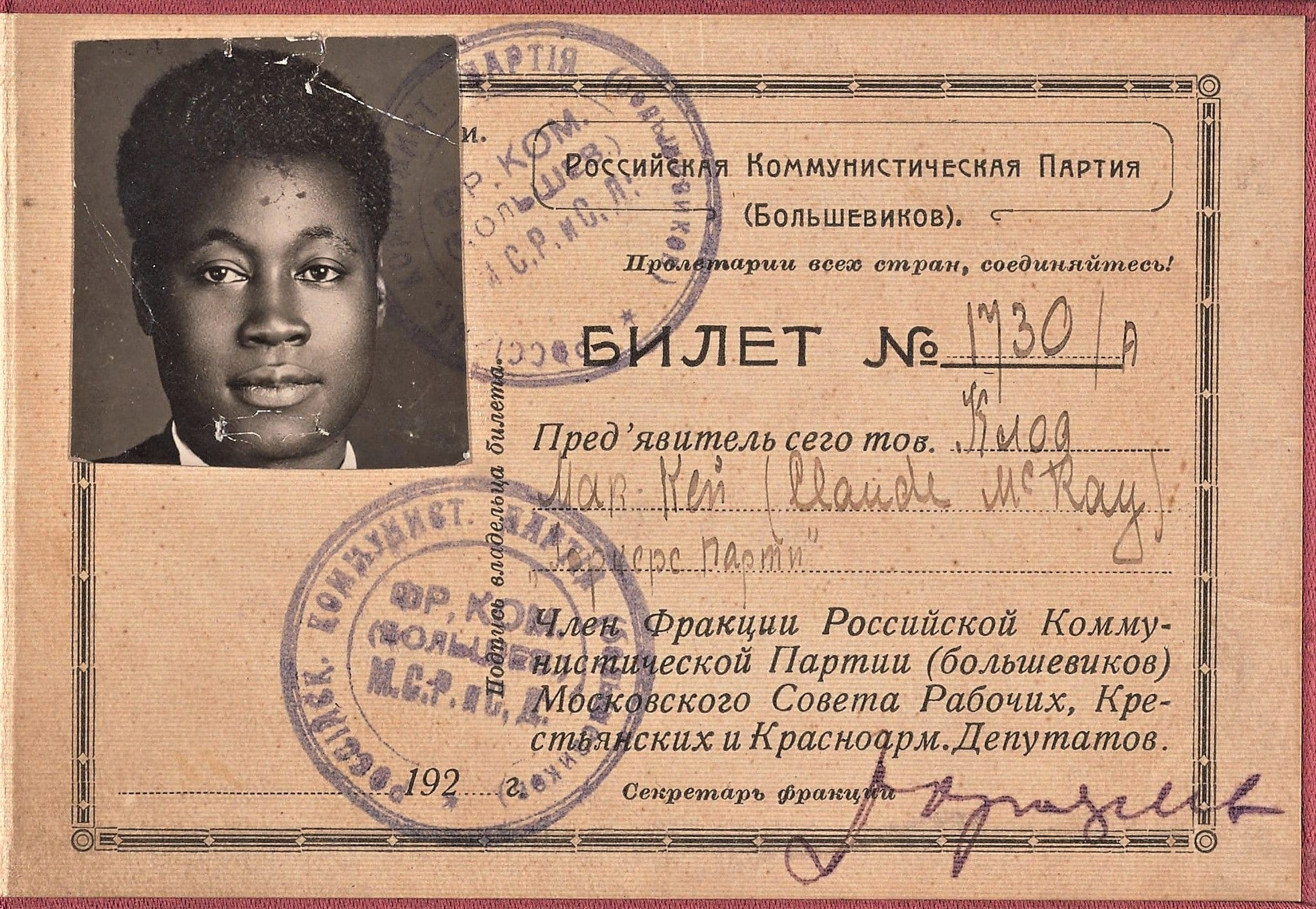
McKay's Russian Communist Party (Bolsheviks) membership card c. 1922–1923

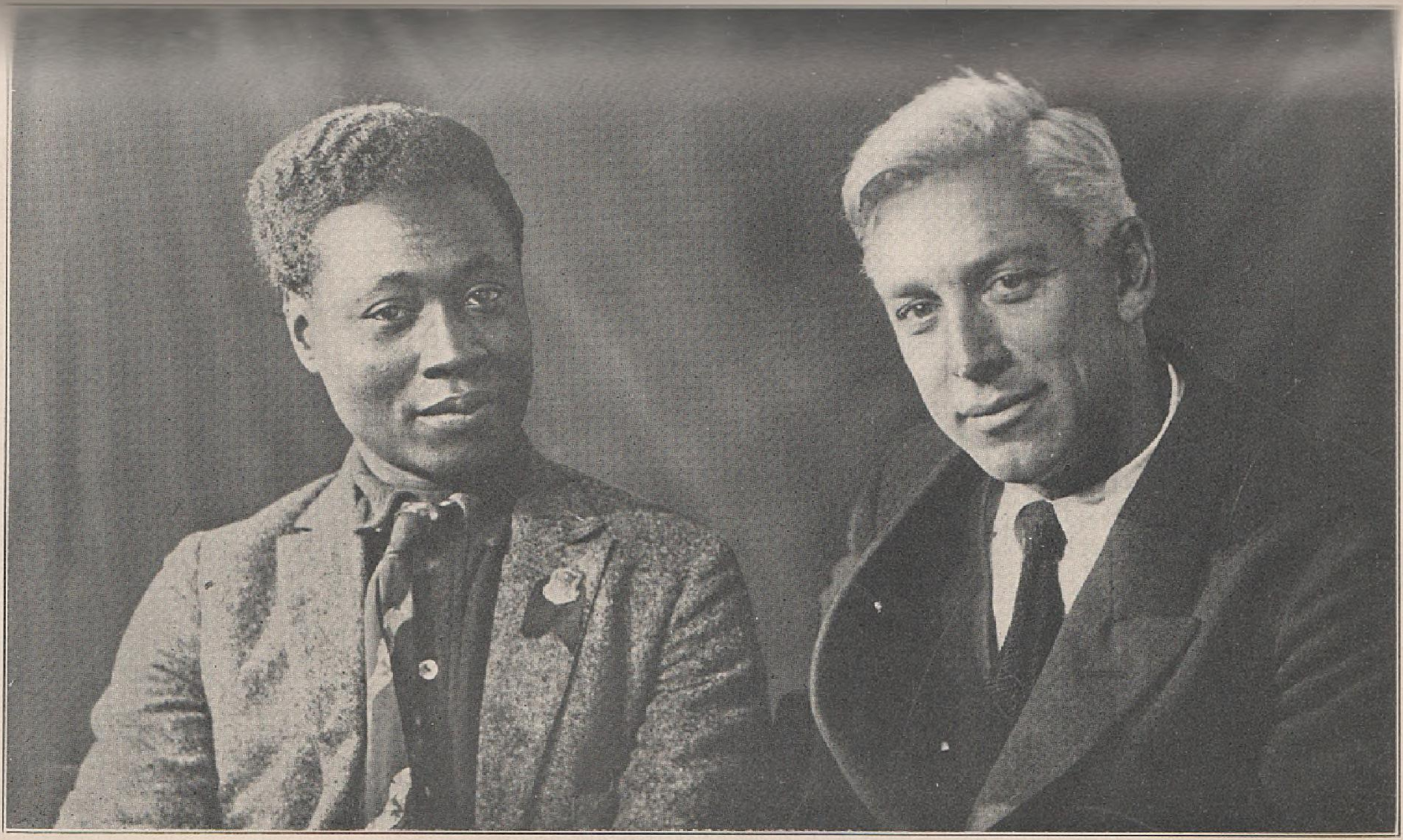
McKay and Max Eastman as delegates to the 4th World Congress of the Communist International, 1923

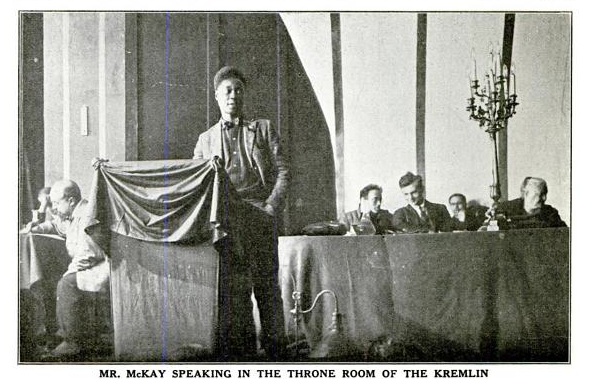
"Mr. McKay speaking in the Throne Room of the Kremlin," published in The Crisis, December, 1923

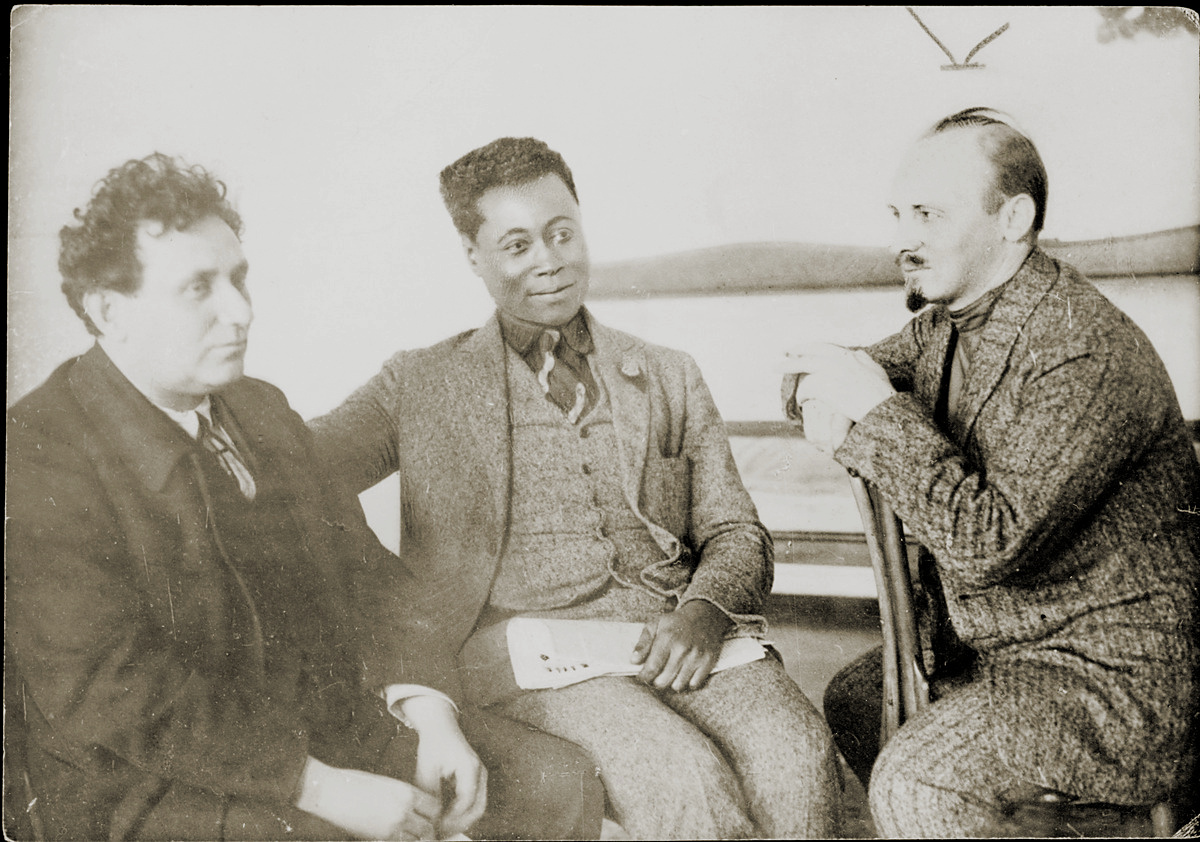
McKay with Grigory Zinoviev and Nikolai Bukharin, 1923

McKay was invited to Russia during the reconstruction of the country by the Communist Party led by Lenin. In November 1922, in what he referred to as his "Magic Pilgrimage," he traveled to Russia to participate in the Fourth Congress of the Communist International in Petrograd and Moscow, where he encountered Max Eastman who was also a delegate. McKay financed his trip to Russia by repackaging and selling Harlem Shadows, "complete with a signed photograph and an inflated price tag" to members of an NAACP donor list and conserved the funds thus raised by working his way across the Atlantic from New York to Liverpool as a stoker on a freighter. He was greeted in Russia with what one historian characterized as "ecstatic welcome" and "rock-star treatment."

=== Later travels ===
McKay wrote about his travels in Morocco in his 1937 autobiography A Long Way from Home. Before this journey, he went to Paris, where he contracted a severe respiratory infection and required hospitalization. After recovering he continued traveling, and for 11 years ventured around Europe and parts of Northern Africa. During this stint he published three novels, the most notable of which was Home to Harlem, in 1928. Reception to the novel varied. In The Negro Novel in America, Robert Bone wrote that it represented "different ways of rebelling against Western civilization", adding that McKay was not entirely successful in articulating his protagonists. However, other people thought that the novel provided a detailed portrayal of the underside of black urban life, with its prostitutes and gamblers.

He also wrote Banana Bottom during this 11-year span. Here McKay presented a clear depiction of his principal theme, that black individuals quest for cultural identity in a white society. His final year abroad saw the creation of Gingertown, a collection of 12 short stories. Half of these tales depict his life in Harlem and the others revolve around his time in Jamaica.

=== Later life ===
McKay became an American citizen in 1940. In 1943 McKay started "Cycle Manuscript", a collection of 54 poems, all but four of them sonnets, often with political subjects and often in tones of satiric invective. After the manuscript was rejected by Harper and Dutton, he wrote to his old friend and editor Max Eastman, asking him "to look through" all the poems and to make any needed revisions. Despite Eastman's efforts, McKay's collection was not published during his lifetime. It is included in his posthumous Complete Poems. Its editor William J. Maxwell discusses this manuscript's history in an extended note. In the mid-40s McKay began to associate with Catholic cultural activists and studied Catholic social theory, first in New York City and then in Chicago where he moved in April 1944; he was baptized there in October 1944. Before his conversion, he had written to Max Eastman, about "doing a lot of reading and research, especially on Catholic work among Negroes—Because if and when I take the step I want to be intellectually honest and sincere about it". (McKay to Eastman, June 1, 1944). Five months after his baptism, he wrote Eastman to assure him that "I am not less the fighter." (McKay to Eastman, October 16, 1944, Rpt. in Passion 305). In 1946, advised to seek a better climate for his health, he moved first to Albuquerque and then to San Francisco, before returning to Chicago in 1947.

On May 22, 1948, he died from a heart attack in Chicago at the age of 57 and was buried at Calvary Cemetery in Queens, New York.

== Literary movements and traditions ==
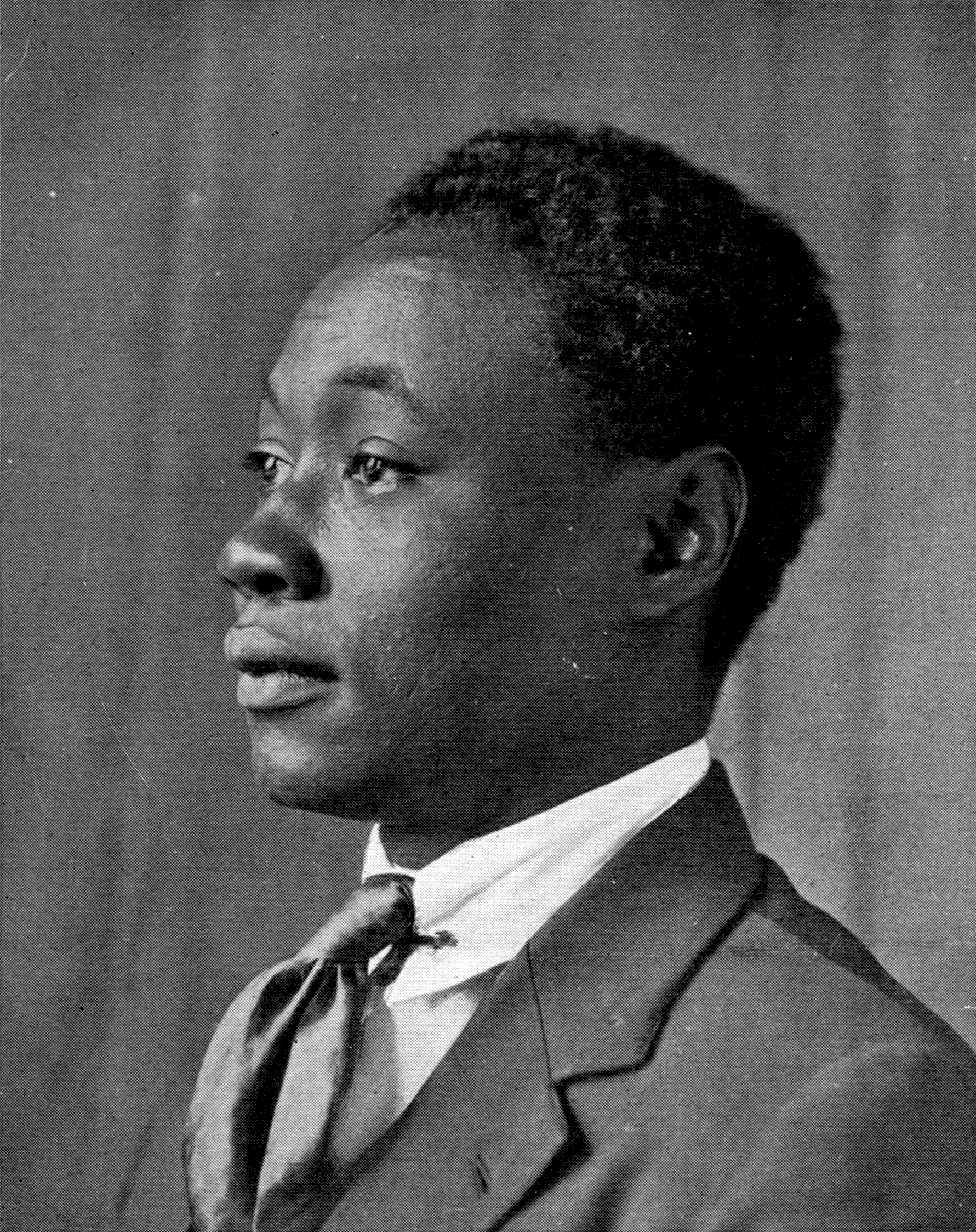
Portrait of McKay in 1920

McKay flourished as a poet during the Harlem Renaissance in the 1920s. During this time, his poems challenged white authority while celebrating Jamaican culture. He also wrote tales about the trials and tribulations of life as a black man in both Jamaica and America. McKay was not secretive about his hatred for racism, and felt that racist people were stupid, shortsighted, and possessed with hatred. In tales such as Home to Harlem (1928), his depictions were initially criticized as a negative portrayal of Harlem and its lower-class citizens by prominent figures such as W. E. B. Du Bois, but McKay was later applauded as a literary force in the Harlem Renaissance.

Among his works that challenged racial discrimination is the poem "If We Must Die" (1919), a call for his people to fight with determination and courage against those who would murder them.

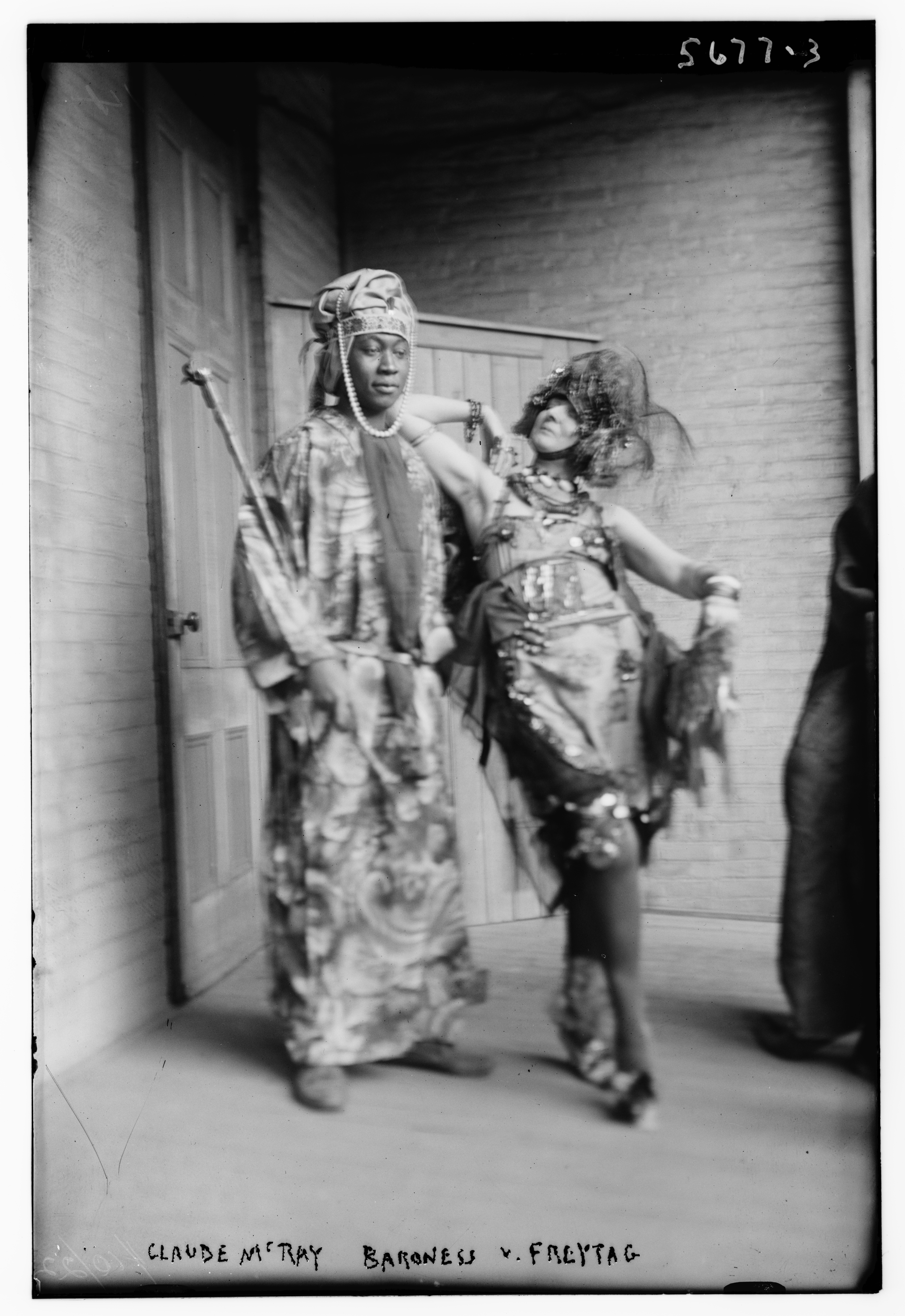
McKay with Elsa von Freytag-Loringhoven in 1920

McKay divested himself from many aspects and growing prescriptions of modernism. By the beginning of the 20th century, the sonnet form had become an antiquated poetic style, but McKay found it an ideal medium to convey his ideas. Many modernists, however, rejected and criticized his use of the sonnet. Despite their reaction, he persevered and created a significant number of modern sonnets.

Having spent time among the artists of Paris in the 1920s, he was intimately acquainted with the dynamics between painters and models and how modernist painters presented African subjects and African culture. In her article "Caribbean Models for Modernism in the Work of Claude McKay and Jean Rhys", Leah Rosenberg writes: "The fascination with African art and its identification with female sexuality was characteristic of modernist and avant-garde primitivism". The inclination to stereotype and caricature the African physical form created, however inadvertently, a form of hegemony reminiscent to McKay of the colonialism he grew up within Jamaica. "Sexuality and black culture," Rosenberg explains, "held a privileged place in modernist and avant-garde art from Picasso to Gertrude Stein". In need of money, McKay posed nude for the Cubist painter André Lhote. Through his experience, McKay saw first-hand how the larger social hegemony between European white supremacy and people of Afro-Caribbean descent could play itself out between the artist and its subject. McKay critically recalled the experience in various ways in many of his most notable works. In doing so, he shone a critical light on a cornerstone of modernism and once again pushed back against a system in which he found himself.

== Political views and social activism ==
McKay joined the Industrial Workers of the World in autumn 1919 while working in a factory—following his time working as a dining-car waiter on the railways. McKay believed that the Communists in the U.S. had other things on their agenda, which did not include African Americans. Furthermore, he thought that they were using the Negro race to fight their battles. During his visit to the Soviet Union he addressed the Third International in a speech titled "Report on the Negro Question" and argued that America was not fully accepting of the Negro Communists. After this speech, he was asked by the Communist Party in Russia to explore this idea more in the form of a book. He wrote Negry v Amerike in 1923. Originally in Russian, and it was not translated into English until 1979. McKay's political and social views were made clear through his literary works. In his 1929 work, Banjo: a Story Without a Plot, McKay included poignant commentary on the Western prioritization of business over racial justice through the character Ray.

== Personal life ==
=== Sexuality ===
According to his biographer, Wayne Cooper, McKay was bisexual; he pursued relationships with both men and women throughout his life. He never officially "came out" and only ever discusses his heterosexual relationships in his own autobiographical writings, but over the years various sources claim that McKay frequented and enjoyed the "clandestine" homosexual communities of New York as well as relationships of intermediate duration with several women. According to Wayne Cooper, Frank and Francine Budgen, whom he knew during his stay in London in 1920, remembered him as "open" about his sexuality and as "not at all effeminate." Several of his poems have been interpreted through a homosexual lens, including poems in which the gender of the speaker is not identified. Some suggest that there was a sexual component to McKay's relationship with his mentor, Walter Jekyll, who was apparently homosexual but there is no evidence one way or the other. Steve Kellerman, in the introduction to The Rambling Kid, claims that in the early 1920s McKay was intermittently involved with the English labor advocate and IWW organizer, poet, and translator Charles Ashleigh. Although there is little evidence one way or the other about McKay's sexuality outside these claims from various people who knew McKay, most scholars agree that he was likely bisexual.

McKay's sexuality is potentially hinted at in some of his literary work. His 1929 novel Banjo: a Story without a Plot, for instance, contains a queer-coded ending. As all the other characters of the ensemble featured in this work make plans to depart, Banjo asks Ray (the two characters most central to the story) to go off separately together. In and of itself, this may not seem to indicate a romantic nature to their future relationship, but as Ray initially considers Banjo's proposal to go off together, he recalls how much joy he associated with the dream of "loafing after their labors long enough to laugh and love and jazz and fight."

Perhaps the strongest evidence of McKay's potential homo- or bisexuality comes from a letter he writes to Louise Bryant in which McKay writes, “I sleep with all the boys, but only the aristocratic ones, and so it's hard to prove anything on me.”

=== Last years and death ===
In his final years, McKay largely abandoned secular ideologies in favor of Catholicism. He worked with Harlem's Friendship House, a branch of the Catholic interracial apostolate founded in the early 1930s in Toronto, Canada. McKay relocated to Chicago, Illinois, where he joined a Catholic organization as a teacher. McKay developed health problems by the mid-1940s, enduring several illnesses until he died of heart failure in 1948.

== Works ==
In 1928, Claude McKay published his most famous novel, Home to Harlem, which won the Harmon Gold Award for Literature. The novel, which depicted street life in Harlem, would have a major impact on black intellectuals in the Caribbean, West Africa, and Europe.

Home to Harlem gained a substantial readership, especially among people who wanted to know more about the intense, sometimes shocking, details of Harlem nightlife. His novel was an attempt to capture the energetic and intense spirit of the "uprooted black vagabonds." In Home to Harlem, McKay looked among the common people for a black identity.

Despite this, the book drew fire from one of McKay's contemporaries, W. E. B. Du Bois. To Du Bois, the novel's frank depictions of sexuality and the nightlife in Harlem only appealed to the "prurient demand[s]" of white readers and publishers looking for portrayals of black "licentiousness." As Du Bois said, "Home to Harlem... for the most part nauseates me, and after the dirtier parts of its filth I feel distinctly like taking a bath." Modern critics now dismiss this criticism from Du Bois, who was more concerned with using art as propaganda in the struggle for African-American political liberation than in the value of art to showcase the truth about the lives of black people. Home to Harlem entered the public domain in the United States in 2024.

McKay's other novels were Banjo (1929) and Banana Bottom (1933). Banjo includes a portrayal of how the French treated people from its sub-Saharan African colonies and centers on black seamen in Marseille. Aimé Césaire stated that in Banjo, blacks were described truthfully and without "inhibition or prejudice". Banana Bottom, McKay's third novel, depicts a black individual in search of a cultural identity in a white society. The book discusses the underlying racial and cultural tensions.

McKay also authored a collection of short stories, Gingertown (1932), two autobiographical books, A Long Way from Home (1937) and My Green Hills of Jamaica (published posthumously in 1979), and a non-fiction, socio-historical treatise entitled Harlem: Negro Metropolis (1940). His Selected Poems (1953) represents his selection and arrangement of 1947, but he was unable to find a publisher for it and it appeared posthumously six years later. According to Amardeep Singh's website, Claude McKay's Early Poetry, it was originally published by Bookman & Associates in 1953 with an introduction by John Dewey and subsequently reprinted by Harcourt Brace with the Dewey introduction replaced by a biographical note by Max Eastman.

== Legacy ==
In 1977, the government of Jamaica named Claude McKay the national poet and posthumously awarded him the Order of Jamaica for his contribution to literature.

In 2002, scholar Molefi Kete Asante listed Claude McKay on his list of 100 Greatest African Americans. McKay is regarded as the "foremost left-wing black intellectual of his age" and his work heavily influenced a generation of black authors including James Baldwin and Richard Wright.

In 2015, a passageway in Marseille was named after McKay.

Claude McKay's poem "If We Must Die" was recited in the film August 28: A Day in the Life of a People, which debuted at the opening of the Smithsonian's National Museum of African American History and Culture in 2016.

== Awards ==
- Jamaican Institute of Arts and Sciences, Musgrave Medal, 1912, for two volumes of poetry, Songs of Jamaica and Constab Ballads.
- Harmon Foundation Award for distinguished literary achievement, NAACP, 1929, for Harlem Shadows and Home to Harlem.
- James Weldon Johnson Literary Guild Award, 1937.
- Order of Jamaica, 1977.

== Selected works ==
=== Poetry collections ===
- Songs of Jamaica (1912)
- Constabe Ballads (1912)
- Spring in New Hampshire and Other Poems (1920)
- Harlem Shadows (1922)
- The Selected Poems of Claude McKay (1953)
- Complete Poems (2004)

=== Fiction ===
- Home to Harlem (1928)
- Banjo (1929)
- Banana Bottom (1933)
- Gingertown (1932)
- Harlem Glory (1990) – but written 1940
- Amiable with Big Teeth (2017) - but composed in 1941
- Romance in Marseille (2020) - but written around 1933

=== Non-fiction ===
- A Long Way from Home (1937)
- My Green Hills of Jamaica (1979, written 1946)
- Harlem: Negro Metropolis (1940)
- The Passion of Claude McKay: Selected Poetry and Prose, 1912-1948, ed. Wayne F. Cooper (includes selected correspondence and periodical essays)

=== Unknown manuscript ===
A previously unknown manuscript of a 1941 novel by McKay was authenticated in 2012. Entitled Amiable With Big Teeth: A Novel of the Love Affair Between the Communists and the Poor Black Sheep of Harlem, the manuscript was discovered in 2009 by Columbia graduate student Jean-Christophe Cloutier in the Samuel Roth Papers, a previously untouched university archive. The novel centers on the ideas and events that animated Harlem on the cusp of World War II, such as Benito Mussolini's invasion of Ethiopia. It was published in February 2017.

== See also ==
- List of people from Harlem
- African-American literature
