= List of monuments to African Americans =

This list may include memorials but does not include plaques or historical markers.

This is a sortable table. Click on the heading you want it sorted by.

Name	Image	Honoree	Location	Designer or sculptor	Date	Comments or inscriptions	References
Bust of York		York (explorer)	Mount Tabor Park, Portland, Oregon	Todd McGrain	February 2021	Toppled in July, 2021. Patriot Front is suspected.	
Robert Gould Shaw Memorial		African American Civil War Soldiers	Boston Common, Boston, MA	Augustus Saint-Gaudens	1897		
Statue of Frederick Douglass		Frederick Douglass	Frederick Douglass Memorial Square, Rochester, NY	Sidney W. Edwards	1899	Douglass & family lived in Rochester 25 years, he's buried in Rochester.	
Colored Soldiers Monument in Frankfort		Colored soldiers	Green Hill Cemetery, Frankfort, KY		1924		
Victory Monument		Eighth Regiment of the Illinois National Guard	Douglas, Chicago, IL	Leonard Crunelle, John A. Nyden	1927		
All Wars Memorial to Colored Soldiers and Sailors		Colored soldiers and sailors	Philadelphia, PA	J. Otto Schweizer	1934		
Mothers of Gynecology Monument		Anarcha Westcott, Betsey, Lucy	Montgomery, AL	Michelle Browder	2021	The women were patients of J. Marion Sims.	
John Brown and African-American child		Enslaved African Americans	John Brown Farm State Historic Site, North Elba, NY	Joseph Pollia	1935	The adult is John Brown.	
Emancipation		Three slaves	Harriet Tubman Park, Boston, MA	Meta Vaux Warrick Fuller	1913; cast in bronze 1999		
El Hombre Redimido			Ponce, Puerto Rico	Victor M. Cott	1956	Commemorates the abolition of slavery in Puerto Rico	
Expelled Because of Color		33 Georgia legislators	Grounds of the Georgia State Capitol, Atlanta, GA	John Thomas Riddle, Jr.	1978	Commemorates the Original 33.	
Civil Rights Memorial		41 civil rights leaders	Montgomery, AL	Maya Lin	1989		
Amistad Memorial		Sengbe Pieh	New Haven City Hall, New Haven, CT	Ed Hamilton	1992		
Statue of Harriet Tubman		Harriet Tubman	Las Sendas Community, Mesa, AZ	Jane DeDecker	1995		
Statue of Harriet Tubman		Harriet Tubman	Brenau University, Gainesville, GA	Jane DeDecker	1997		
Duke Ellington Circle		Duke Ellington	Manhattan, New York City, NY	Robert Graham	1997		
Statue of Malcolm X		Malcolm X	Malcolm X and Dr. Betty Shabazz Memorial and Educational Center, New York City, NY	Gabriel Koren	1997		
Harriet Tubman Memorial		Harriet Tubman	Harriet Tubman Park, Boston, MA	Fern Cunningham	1999		
African American History Monument			South Carolina State House, Columbia, South Carolina	Ed Dwight	2001	The history of African Americans in South Carolina from the slave trade to modern times.	
Sojourner Truth Memorial		Sojourner Truth	Florence, MA		2002		
African-American Monument		African Americans	Savannah, GA	Dorothy Spradley	2002		
Integration		Maxwell Courtney; Doby Flowers; Fred Flowers	Florida State University, Tallahassee, FL	W. Stanley Proctor	2004	Portrays Maxwell Courtney, the first African-American to enroll and graduate; Doby Flowers, the first black Miss Florida State University; and Fred Flowers, first black varsity athlete.	
Statue of Harriet Tubman		Harriet Tubman	Little Rock, AR	Jane DeDecker	2004		
Statue of Fred Lee Douglas		Fred Lee Douglas	Frenchtown, Tallahassee, FL,		2004	Douglas was the first black policeman in Tallahassee assigned to a regular beat.	
Statue of Harriet Tubman		Harriet Tubman	Ypsilanti, MI	Jane DeDecker	2005		
C. K. Steele Statue and Plaza		Reverend C. K. Steele	Tallahassee, FL	David Lowe	2005	Tallahassee civil rights leader of the 1950s.	
Harriet Tubman Memorial		Harriet Tubman	Manhattan, New York City, NY	Alison Saar	2007		
Ray Charles memorial		Ray Charles	Greenville, FL	Bradley Cooley, Brad Cooley Jr	2006	He grew up in Greenville.	
29th Colored Regiment Monument		29th Connecticut Colored Infantry Regiment	New Haven, CT	Ed Hamilton	2008		
Statue of Frederick Dogulass		Frederick Douglass	Harlem, New York City, NY	Gabriel Koren	2009		
Bust of Sojourner Truth		Sojourner Truth	U.S. Capitol, Washington, D.C.	Artis Lane	2009		
Frederick Douglass Statue		Frederick Douglass	Talbot County Courthouse, Easton, MD	Jay Hall Carpenter	2011	Douglass was from Talbot County.	
Frederick Douglass		Frederick Douglass	U.S. Capitol, Washington, D.C.	Steven Weitzman	2013		
Statue of Rosa Parks		Rosa Parks	U.S. Capitol, Washington, D.C.	Eugene Daub	2013		
Sojourner Truth Memorial		Sojourner Truth	Esopus, NY	Trina Greene	2013	Portrays her as a slave child. She was born in Esopus.	
Denmark Vesey Monument		Denmark Vesey	Hampton Park, Charleston, SC		2014	Portrayed as a carpenter, holding a Bible	
Slavery Memorial			Brown University, Providence, RI	Martin Puryear	2014		
Frederick Douglass		Frederick Douglass	University of Maryland, College Park, College Park, MD	Andrew Edwards	2015	Douglass was from Marylander.	
Benjamin Banneker statue		Benjamin Banneker	National Museum of African American History and Culture, Washington, D.C.		2016	Statue stands in front of a plan of the City of Washington, which Banneker did not plan, design or survey (see Mythology of Benjamin Banneker and List of common misconceptions)	
The Quest for Parity		Octavius Catto	Philadelphia City Hall, Philadelphia, PA	Branly Cadet	2017		
National Memorial for Peace and Justice		Victims of lynching	Montgomery, AL	Kwame Akoto-Bamfo, Hank Willis Thomas, MASS Design Group	2018	Six acre site, with 805 hanging steel replicas of coffins.	
Memorial to Enslaved Laborers		Enslaved laborers at the University of Virginia	Charlottesville, VA		2020		
Women's Rights Pioneers Monument		Sojourner Truth	Central Park, New York City, NY	Meredith Bergmann	2020	Also Susan B. Anthony, Elizabeth Cady Stanton	
Statue of Mary McLeod Bethune		Mary McLeod Bethune	U.S. Capitol, Washington, D.C.		Future	To represent Florida, replacing statue of Confederate General Edmund Kirby Smith.	
Hearth: Memorial to the Enslaved		African Americans enslaved by the College of William & Mary	College of William and Mary, Williamsburg, VA		May 2022		
Monument to 1st Rhode Island Regiment		African American soldiers of 1st Rhode Island Regiment who died in the 1781 Revolutionary War Battle of Pine's Bridge	church cemetery in Yorktown Heights, New York		1982		
Pines Bridge Monument		Soldiers and officers of the racially integrated 1st Rhode Island Regiment who died in the 1781 Battle of Pine's Bridge	Yorktown Heights, New York	Thomas Jay Warren	2018	Sculpture depicts commanding officer Col. Christopher Greene and two of his soldiers—an African American and a Native American.	
Emancipation and Freedom Monument		Emancipated slaves	Brown's Island, Richmond, Virginia	Thomas Jay Warren	2021	replaces the Robert E. Lee Monument	
Enslaved Africans' Raingarden		five of the first enslaved people to be freed from slavery in the state of New York	Yonkers, New York	Vinnie Bagwell	2020	Associated with Philipse Manor Hall State Historic Site	
The First Lady of Jazz		Ella Fitzgerald	Yonkers, New York	Vinnie Bagwell	1996	Depicts Fitzgerald singing with open arms and "snapping fingers."	
(Here I Stand) In the Spirit of Paul Robeson		Paul Robeson	Washington, D.C.	Allen Uzikee Nelson	2001	Abstract steel statue of the singer, professional football player, author, and activist, formally dedicated on the 103rd anniversary of his birth.	
Mothers of Gynecology Monument		Betsey Anarcha Lucy	Montgomery Ala.	Michelle Browder	2021	This monument honors each woman with unique qualities embedded in their renderings. Betsey has the names of Black women which include Harriet Jacobs and Augusta Savage and Angela Davis	1
