= Jovita Fontanez =

- Born: New York, United States
- Education: Northeastern University
- Known for: Boston Election Commission, Electoral College of Massachusetts

Jovita Fontánez is the first Hispanic woman to serve as head of the Boston Election Commission and the first Hispanic woman elected to the Electoral College of Massachusetts. In 2014, she was honored for her contributions to the Centro de Estudios Puertorriqueños (Center for Puerto Rican Studies) archive at Hunter College of the City University of New York.

== Early life and education ==
Fontanez was born in New York to a Puerto Rican family. In the 1950s, she moved to the South End of Boston with her family when she was eight, and later became active in Boston politics. After she arrived in Boston, her English skills were underdeveloped, and she was held back in fourth grade.

She graduated from the University of Massachusetts Boston in 1984 with a sociology degree, holds an MPA from Northeastern University, and has completed executive management graduate programs at Harvard Business School and the Harvard Kennedy School of Government.

== Career ==
During the course of her career, Fontanez has worked for a variety of government agencies, nonprofit organizations, and political campaigns. She served as the head of the Boston Election Commission for three years.

She has served as one of the first Latina commissioners of the Boston Fair Housing Commission, was the founding member and associate director of the South End Community Health Center, a family case worker for South End Neighborhood Action Program, and worked as a business manager for the City of Boston Business Development Office. She has regularly attended the Democratic National Convention as a delegate. In 2013, she was a member of the Massachusetts Democratic Latino Caucus.

She has also been a grassroots community activist, and in 1994 helped found and served as a director of Casa Esperanza's Latinas y Niños, a residential treatment facility focused on the needs of Latina women, including to allow mothers to maintain custody of their children while they complete treatment, as well as additional supports such as job training and parenting classes.

She has also served as a board member of Inquilinos Boricuas en Acción (IBA), Morgan Memorial Goodwill Industries, and the South End Community Health Center.

== Honors and awards ==
- 2012, La Alianza Hispana honor, for support of the Latino community

== Personal life ==
She raised her two children in her home on Dartmouth Street in Boston. In 2004, she underwent a successful operation to remove a benign brain tumor.
