= Frieda Garcia =

Activist

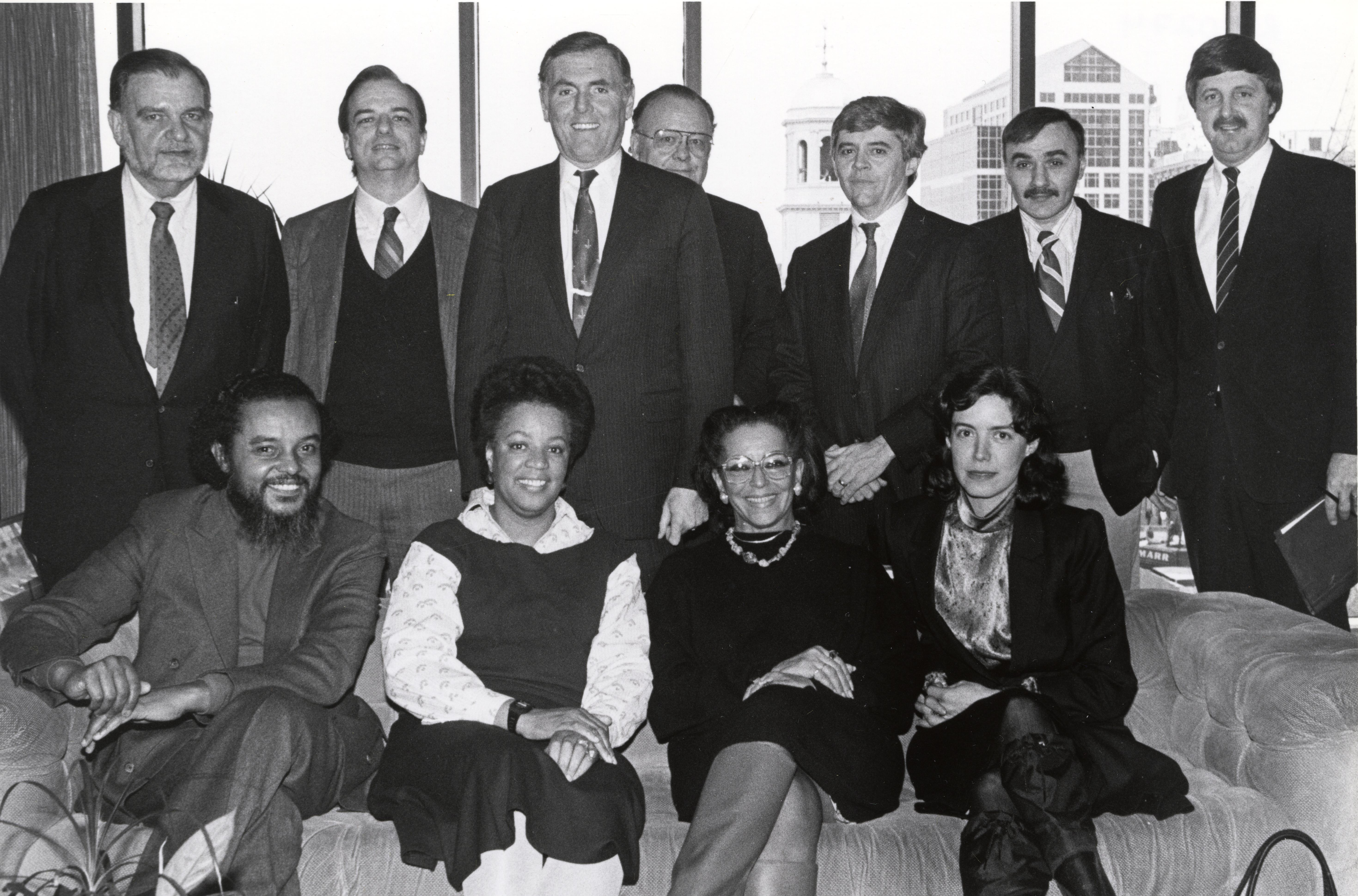
Frieda Garcia (front row, third from the left) in the mid 1980s meeting with Boston mayor Raymond Flynn and other city officials.

Frieda Garcia is a longtime activist and community organizer in the South End and Roxbury areas of Boston, Massachusetts. She served as Executive Director of the United South End Settlement for 20 years and was one of the founding members of La Alianza Hispana.

== Personal life ==
Frieda Garcia was born in the Dominican Republic. She moved with her family to New York when she was eight years old. In 1965 when she was in her early thirties, Garcia moved to Boston.

Garcia holds a BA from the New School of Social Research. Garcia was awarded an honorary degree from Wheelock College in 2002 and an honorary degree from Salem State University in 2017.

== Career ==
In 1965, Frieda Garcia moved to Boston where she began working with the Roxbury Multi-Service Center. At the time, the center was run by Hubie Jones, a prominent community organizer in Boston. Jones, who served as a mentor for Garcia, later encouraged her to help Ana Maria Rodriguez co-found La Alianza Hispana in 1969. Garcia served as the first director of La Alianza Hispana where she worked to provide a number of services to Spanish-speaking residents of Boston. Beginning in 1975, Garcia also served on the judicial nominating committee for Governor Michael Dukakis for four years.

By 1978, Garcia had become the director of consultation and education at the Solomon Carter Fuller Mental Health Center. During her time there, Garcia was responsible for founding the first anti-rape program at the center as well as sending psychologists to schools during the Boston busing crisis to help students attending affected schools.

In 1981, Garcia began serving on the board of directors of the Boston Foundation and also became the executive director of United South End Settlements where she served for 20 years, creating programs for children, supporting affordable housing, and advocating for literacy and job training. During her time with USES, Garcia also started the first open-access computer center in the city of Boston to provide these services. In 1981, Garcia also co-chaired a march by the South End Ad Hoc Committee Against Crime to protest cuts in police protection in South End neighborhoods.

In 1996, Garcia started a committee to advocate for a statue of Harriet Tubman to be built in Harriet Tubman Park, citing the fact that there were no statues dedicated to women on public property; in 1998, The Harriet Tubman Memorial Committee received funding to create this memorial. Garcia has continued to advocate for upkeep and revitalization of Harriet Tubman Park, successfully raising funds in 2017 to install a solar powered irrigation system as well as to replace and supplement existing plants in the park. In 2021 representatives from the Canadian Consulate in Boston held a honored Harriet Tubman with a wreath-laying ceremony for her efforts bringing enslaved people to freedom in Canada through the Underground Railroad, in particular in Southern Ontario, St. Catherines. Garcia is Chair of the Friends of the Harriet Tubman Park.

== Awards and distinctions ==
Garcia received the Harriet Tubman Community Achievement Award from United South End Settlements in 2012 for carrying on the legacy of Harriet Tubman.

In 2013 the Frieda Garcia Children's Park at Clarendon and Stanhope streets in Boston's South End was named after her.

A year later, in 2014, a mural depicting Garcia was dedicated at the Rosie's Place offices at 47 Thorndike Street. A portrait of Garcia also hangs in the South End House on Rutland Street which is part of United South End Settlements, and is featured on the Boston Women's Heritage Trail.

Garcia is one of 69 civil rights and social justice leaders honored in the 1965 Freedom Plaza located beneath The Embrace statue on the Boston Common and unveiled in January 2023.
