= Nelson Merced =

American politician

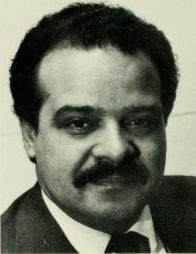
- official portrait, 1989

Member of the Massachusetts House of Representatives from the 5th Suffolk District
- In office 1989–1993
- Preceded by: Richard J. Rouse
- Succeeded by: Althea Garrison

Personal details
- Born: August 17, 1947 (age 79) New York City
- Party: Democratic
- Education: University of Connecticut; Massachusetts Institute of Technology
- Occupation: Urban Planner; Politician

Nelson Merced (born August 17, 1947, in New York City) is a Massachusetts Latino activist and politician. He was the first Hispanic elected to the Massachusetts General Court, serving from 1989 to 1993 as Democratic representative from the fifth Suffolk District in Boston, including the Roxbury and North Dorchester neighborhoods.

== Early life, family and education ==
Nelson Merced was born in New York in 1948 and moved back and forth between the Northeast of the United States and Puerto Rico with his family several times before joining the United States Navy in 1965. After leaving the navy, he lived in Puerto Rico with his parents and was active in the squatters’ rights movement in San Juan. Returning to the United States in 1971, Merced settled in Massachusetts in 1976. He worked for the Massachusetts Department of Public Welfare, and took the position of the director of La Alianza Hispana in 1981.

Merced has a bachelor's degree from the University of Connecticut and did graduate work at the Massachusetts Institute of Technology.

== Political career ==
In 1988, Merced became the first Latino to serve in the Massachusetts House of Representatives and the first Hispanic to hold state office in the commonwealth. He held this position until 1992, running a successful re-election campaign in 1990. During his time in the House, Merced was active in the campaign to promote and protect bilingual education in Massachusetts as well as working for immigrants’ rights and the reform of the Boston Public Schools. He also wrote legislation creating an Urban Initiative Fund, and was a key legislative leader for the first bill that sought to establish community reinvestment mandates for the insurance industry.

In 1994, Merced took a position as the CEO of Inquilinos Boricuas en Acción just prior to the organization's proposed merger with the Escuelita Agueybana Day Care Center. The merger never took place and, in 1996, Merced left the organization. In 2005, Merced took a position as the Director of National Initiatives and Applied Research with NeighborWorks America, a nonprofit sponsored by the US Congress.

Merced was also a member of the U.S. Commission on Immigration Reform, appointed by the US Senate and sometimes known as the Jordan Commission after its chair, Barbara Jordan. The commission was formed in 1990 to propose reforms to United States immigration policies, which it did in a series of reports issued between 1994 and 1997.

== Other activities ==
Merced was a founding member and first president of the Dudley Street Neighborhood Initiative, a unique and nationally recognized community development organization. Over the past 15 years, Merced has lectured at the University of Massachusetts Amherst in community planning, personnel management, funding strategies, and the legislative process.
