= Dudley Street Neighborhood Initiative =

Non-profit organization

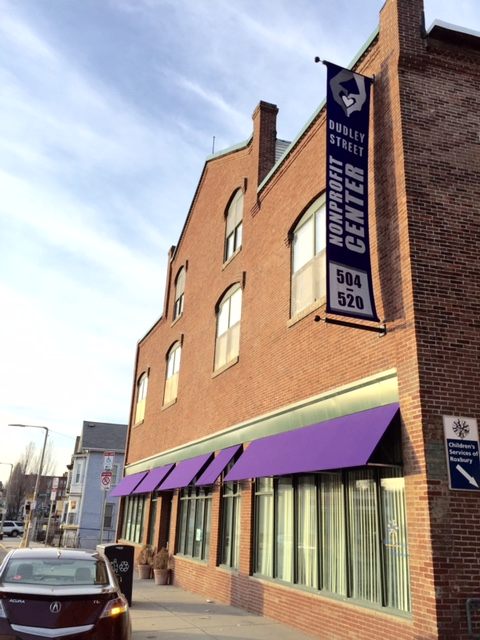
Dudley Street Initiative Building

The Dudley Street Neighborhood Initiative, or DSNI, is a nonprofit, community-run organization based in Roxbury, Massachusetts. It was founded in 1984 by residents of the Dudley Street Neighborhood, along with members of the Riley Foundation, as an effort to rebuild the poverty-stricken community surrounding then-Dudley Square (now Nubian Square). It is known as the first and only community-run grassroots organization to gain "the power of eminent domain" by the Boston Redevelopment Authority, meaning the community controls its own development and the use of the land. Today, 35 board of directors help to govern the more than 3,000 active members of DSNI. The board of directors are elected by locals every two years, and must represent the community's four major ethnic groups: African American, Cape Verdean, Latino and White, as well as the local youth, businesses, nonprofits, churches and CDC's that support the initiative.

== Early history ==
By the 1960s, the once vibrant community surrounding the Dudley Street Area of Roxbury, Massachusetts, had "deteriorated into one of the poorest in Boston", overrun by the dumping of toxic waste and abandoned homes. Throughout the 1970s, the community became more run-down as a result of neglect and "divestment" from Boston-area financial institutions, and by the 1980s, "more than one-fifth of the neighborhood's land was vacant". Those that lived and worked in the community became angered by the lack of attention this poor neighborhood received from its nearby wealthier Boston neighbors.

In 1984, Nelson Merced worked on Dudley Street as the director of La Alianza Hispana, a nonprofit that advocates for success within the Hispanic community. At the time, the Dudley Street Neighborhood was populated by many impoverished Hispanics, African Americans, Jews, and members of other minority groups, many of whom could not afford to live elsewhere. Merced began looking for funds to renovate the La Alianza Hispana building in spring 1984 when he reached out to the Boston-based Riley Foundation, which provides grants for inner-city organizations. Merced's hope was that he could give the Riley Foundation trustees a tour of Dudley Square in order to gain their support in improving the area.

On April 12, 1984, the four Riley Foundation trustees agreed to visit Nelson Merced and the Dudley Street Neighborhood. One of the trustees, Newell Flather, later stated that Dudley was the "most disadvantaged area in the city", and another, Robert Holmes, described the vacant land he saw as "negative space". The tour of the run-down neighborhood was enough to convince the Riley Foundation to help the community. Discussions began between the foundation and Merced, along with other community organization leaders.

Later that year, on September 17, 1984, the Riley Foundation invited Dudley organization leaders to a meeting to discuss the potential next steps in re-building the community. The group created the "Dudley Advisory Group", which voted to establish its own organization almost a month later on October 15, 1984. The Dudley Street Neighborhood Initiative was born.

== Mission ==
According to the Dudley Street Neighborhood Initiative Mission Statement, The DSNI "seeks to organize, plan for, create and control a vibrant, high-quality and diverse neighborhood in collaboration with community partners." Each DSNI plan to improve the neighborhood is created for its residents, by its residents. It believes its major accomplishment has been empowering its residents to take control over the development and maintenance of the neighborhood, and wants to continue to strive for individual, as well as community-wide, empowerment.

=== DSNI goals ===
- Education improvement
- The construction and rehabilitation of new homes
- Economic development to create more jobs and raise the overall income of community residents
- Continuing to empower residents

== Programs and projects ==
Since its start in 1984, the DSNI has created a number of programs and projects dedicated to specific areas of concern within the community.

- Don't Dump On Us! was a 1986 campaign to end the dumping of toxic wastes on Dudley's vacant lots. The campaign was successful in eliminating the illegal dumping, but also in sparking annual neighborhood clean-up events throughout the Dudley Street area that are still in existence today.
- The Dudley Neighbors, Inc. (DNI) is a community land trust originally established in 1988. The sub-group of DSNI gained the nonprofit the power of eminent domain through General Laws Chapter 121A, after it was approved by the state of Massachusetts to become its own "Urban Redevelopment Corporation." Since this point, the DNI has been able to lease vacant lots to developers in order to create more affordable housing options for its residents, and ultimately more jobs.
- Dudley PRIDE also known as "People and Resources Investing in Dudley's Environment" was created in the fall of 1991 as a means of improving the aesthetics of the neighborhood, as well as the sense of "pride" in the community. Its goals include: "increasing public safety and heightening city responsiveness around health, safety and environmental issues." The group produces a periodic newsletter that is translated in three languages.
- DSNI Economic Development Committee was formed in 1992 as a direct result to the fact that the Dudley neighborhood had seen vast improvements in the environmental, youth, and housing developments, but not as much in the economic sector. The committee recognizes that economic development is often influenced by "regional, national and international forces" that are beyond the control of the neighborhood residents; however, it focuses on influencing change at a resident and community level. For example, the committee held a conference at the Roxbury Community College in 1993 that had over 300 attendees. The conference held three workshops to highlight its strategy behind economic improvement in the Dudley Street area: "Starting a Business", "Finding Job Skills", and "Jobs Now."

=== Education and youth initiatives ===
- GOTCHA (Get Off The Corner Hanging Around) is a group to connect Dudley area adolescents with job opportunities early on in their development. The DSNI partners with the Bowdoin Street Health Center, Bird Street Community Center, Dorcester Bay EDC and The City School in order to establish a network for youths to gain employment experience and necessary skills.
- Dudley Children Thrive is a sector of Boston Children Thrive, a Mayor Menino created organization to increase parent's involvement and leadership potential in Boston city schools. The DCT partners with local organizations to help educate the parents of children in the area. Such organizations include: the Child Services of Roxbury, Project Hope, and La Alianza Hispana.
- Dudley Youth Council is a youth-run group that's mission is to empower other Dudley-area youth to participate in the rebuilding of the community.

== Notable alumni and key figures ==
- Nelson Merced, one of the founding members and first president of the Dudley Street Neighborhood Initiative. He later became the first Latino to be elected to the Massachusetts State Legislature.
- John Barros, former Executive Director of DSNI, was appointed Boston's Chief of Economic Development by Mayor Marty Walsh in 2014.
- Clarence "Jeep" Jones originally gave the DSNI the power of eminent domain when he served on the board of the Boston Redevelopment Authority in 1988.
- Raymond Flynn, mayor who, in 1989, agreed to grant eminent domain powers to the group
- Thomas Menino, Boston's longest-serving mayor from 1993 until 2013, supported DSNI's initiatives financially and politically. Menino was known, in part, for his focus on neighborhood development within the Boston community, and many believe that without his support, DSNI would not have had nearly as many successes throughout its thirty-year span.
- Paul Bothwell, originally from the South End neighborhood of Boston, moved to Dudley in 1976, where he remained for many years. He was one of the active members involved in the original talks to initiate neighborhood change before the DSNI was constructed in 1984.
- Ché Madyun also moved to Dudley with her family in 1976. From DSNI's origins she expressed interest in helping the community and her children build better futures. She served on the first DSNI advisory board, and later became the Initiative's president in the fall of 1986. She served as president for a number of years, and symbolized to many that the DSNI was "resident-driven".
- Peter Medoff was elected by the first DSNI advisory board to become its first director in March 1986. Medoff came from a background of urban planning and stressed his commitment to maintaining the DSNI as a primarily neighborhood-controlled community.
