= Perry Cossart Baird Jr. =

American physician

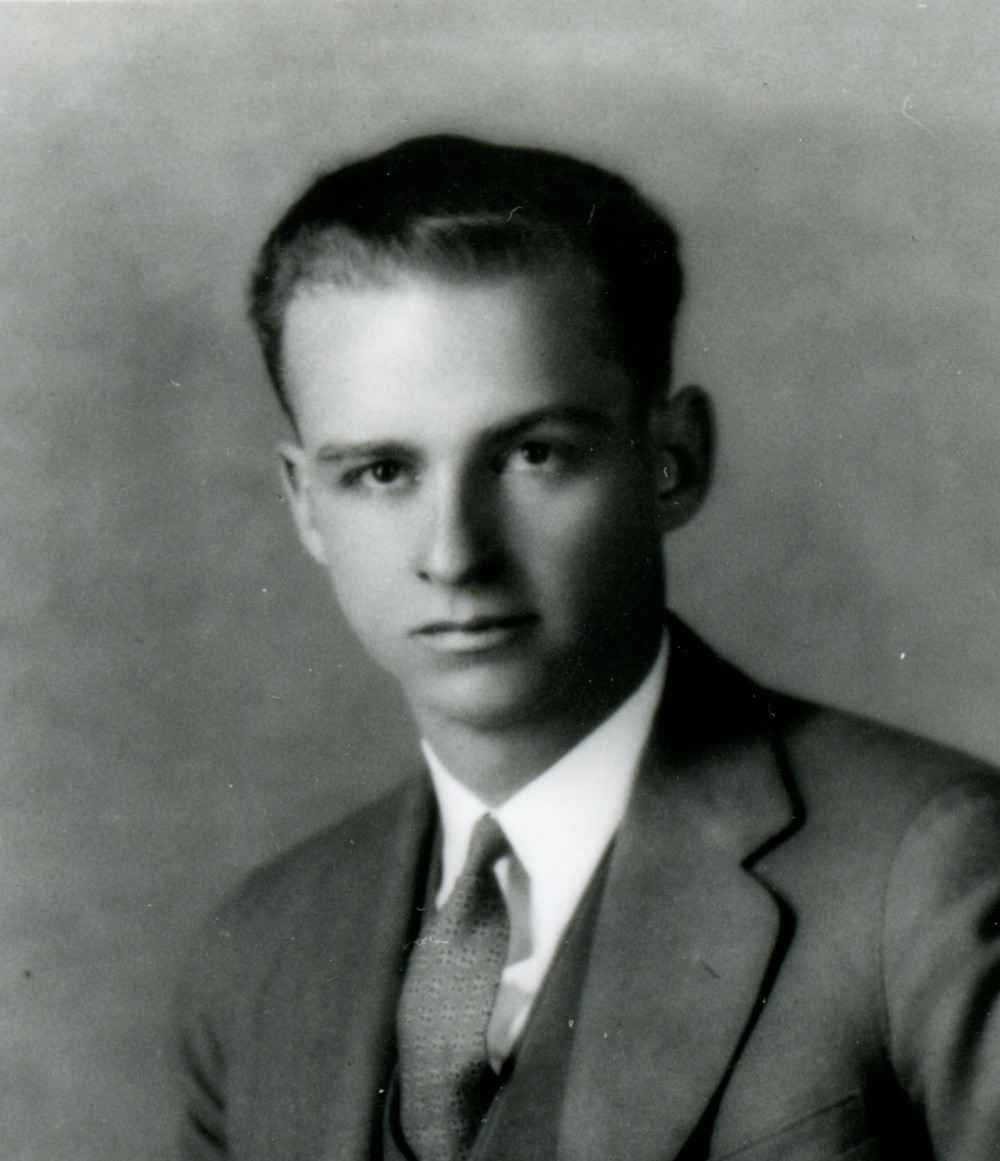
- Baird in 1928, the year of his graduation from Harvard Medical School.
- Born: July 8, 1903; Mexia, Texas
- Died: May 4, 1959 (aged 55)
- Education: University of Texas, Harvard Medical School
- Parent(s): Emma Aurelia Smith Baird (née Duncan) and Perry Cossart Baird, Sr.

Perry Cossart Baird Jr. (1903–1959) was an American physician, who while suffering from bipolar disorder (then known as manic depressive psychosis) was also trying to find the cause of the disease. During this time, the prevailing theory was that mental illness was psychological, not physiological. He was the first person to search for a biochemical basis for mania, by injecting adrenalectomized animals with the blood of manic patients.

In April 1944, Baird's article Biochemical Component of the Manic-Depressive Psychosis was published in the Journal of Nervous and Mental Disease. These experiments predated John Cade's experiments in Australia in 1948, which led to the discovery of lithium as an effective treatment for mental illness.

Baird's research was halted many times due to his own manic episodes and the work was never completed. During his incarceration in Westborough State Hospital and Baldpate Hospital, Baird wrote a manuscript of his experiences, titled “Echoes from a Dungeon Cell”, detailing the harsh treatment of mental patients at that time.^{[1]}^{]}

In 2015, his research work and the manuscript he wrote while institutionalised were published in a book, He Wanted The Moon: The Madness and Medical Genius of Dr. Perry Baird and His Daughter’s Quest to Know Him, written by his daughter, Mimi Baird. Plan B Entertainment has optioned the book for a film and Tony Kushner is writing the screenplay.

== Education ==
In June, 1924 Baird graduated magna cum laude and Phi Beta Kappa from the University of Texas in just three years and went on to attend Harvard Medical School. While in medical school, he published several articles in the American Journal of Physiology (see below) and in June 1928 graduated magna cum laude with the highest academic honors available.

== Life, research and manic depression ==
On Christmas Day, 1931, Baird married Margaretta Stewart Gibbons in Bala Cynwyd, Pennsylvania. The two went on to have two daughters: Mary Stewart (Mimi), born in 1938, and Catherine Cossart in 1940.

Baird's first hospitalization for a manic episode occurred in 1932, resulting in the rescinding of a planned appointment to chairman of dermatology at the Massachusetts General Hospital. Despite the setback, Baird continued his research and studies, publishing in medical journals and later opening his private practice in dermatology in 1934. As a graduate assistant in research at the Massachusetts General Hospital, he began experiments exploring the concept that individuals who are in a state of mania exhibit a biochemical imbalance.

After experiencing another manic episode, Baird was admitted to McLean Hospital in the fall of 1934 and stepped away from his research. But in 1940, he resumed, beginning a correspondence with Massachusetts General Hospital's Dr. Walter B. Cannon and drafting an article on the biochemical component of mania. In late 1943, The Journal of Nervous and Mental Disease accepted Baird's article: “Biochemical Component of the Manic-Depressive Psychosis.” Upon its 1944 publication, Baird was being held at Westborough State Hospital as a psychiatric patient.

After multiple hospitalizations, the Massachusetts Board of Registration rescinded Baird's medical license in 1944, and Baird and his wife divorced later the same year. His hospitalizations continued in Bridgewater State Hospital for the Criminally Insane, Danvers State Hospital, Butler Hospital, and finally Galveston State Psychopathic Hospital.

In December 1949, Baird received a pre-frontal bilateral lobotomy. A few years later, in 1951, he attended his medical school reunion in Boston and saw his daughters for the last time. After moving to Detroit in 1959 to work at a hospital emergency room, Baird died from a postoperative seizure.

== Scientific papers ==
- The Involuntary Contraction Follow Isometric Contraction of Skeletal Muscle in Man, A. Forbes, P.C. Baird, and A. McH. Hopkins. The American Journal of Physiology, Vol. 78, No. 1, 81–103, September, 1926
- The Relative Duration of Contraction in Flexors And Extensors, P.C. Baird, Jr., and J.F. Fulton. The American Journal of Physiology, Vol. LXXX1, 462–463, 1927
- Weight and the Month of Birth, W.T. Porter and P.C. Baird, Jr. The American Journal of Physiology, Vol.81, No.1, 1–5, June, 1927
- The Effect of the Interval Following Decerebration on The Results of Low Spinal Treatment, A. Forbes and P.C. Baird, Jr. American Journal of Physiology, Vol.87, 527–531, January 1929
- Treatment of Addison’s Disease with Cortin, Perry C. Baird, Jr. and Fuller Albright. Archives of Internal Medicine, 394–409, 1932
- Effect of Cortical Hormone in Preventing Extreme Drop in Colonic Temperature, Displayed by Hypophysectomized Rats upon Exposure to Cold with Preliminary Observations upon the Effect Of Hypophyseal and other Hormones, Perry C. Baird, Jr., Elizabeth Cloney and Fuller Albright. American Journal of Physiology, 104, #2: 489–501, January, 1933
- Common Missed Diagnoses in Dermatology, Dr. Perry C. Baird, Jr. The Medical Clinics of North America, Vol. 21, 621–635, March, 1937
- Report on Medical Progress: Dermatology, Perry C. Baird, Jr. M.D. The New England Journal of Medicine, Vol. 220, 794–801, May, 1939
- Medical Progress: Etiology and Treatment of Urticaria: Diagnosis, Prevention and Treatment of Poison-Ivy Dermatitis, Perry C. Baird, Jr. The New England Journal of Medicine, Vol. 224, 649–658, April, 1941.
- The Physiology of the Skin, Perry C. Baird, Jr. and Walter F. Lever and Tom D. Spies. Annual Review of Physiology, Vol. 4, 171–184, 1942
- Biochemical Component of the Manic-Depressive Psychosis, Perry C. Baird, Jr. M.D. The Journal of Nervous and Mental Disease, Vol. 99, 359–366, June, 1944
