= Clarence "Jeep" Jones =

American politician (1933–2020)

- Born: April 17, 1933; Boston, Massachusetts
- Died: February 1, 2020 (aged 86); Boston, Massachusetts
- Education: Winston-Salem State University
- Occupations: Community Activist, City Official
- Organization(s): City of Boston, Boston Redevelopment Authority
- Known for: First African-American Deputy Mayor of Boston

Clarence "Jeep" Jones (April 17, 1933 – February 1, 2020) was an American community activist who was closely tied to the Roxbury neighborhood of Boston throughout his personal and professional life. Jones was the first African-American Deputy Mayor of the city of Boston. He had a 32-year career with the Boston Redevelopment Authority, serving as the chairman of the board for 24 years.

== Early life ==
Jones was born on April 17, 1933, in Boston, Massachusetts. He grew up in the present-day neighborhood of Lower Roxbury. Much of Jones' childhood was spent within an area between the roads of Malcolm X Boulevard, Tremont Street, Hammond Street, and Shawmut Avenue. At the time, the neighborhood mainly consisted of African Americans and West Indians, but included other nationalities as well which gave rise to a cultural and lively atmosphere. In a 2008 interview, Jones stated that "we used to kid each other about our backgrounds an awful lot...It was a very, I guess you could say, Neapolitan neighborhood, but a very close knit, the kids were very close."

This close-knit bond with his direct neighbors led to a competitive atmosphere with 'rival' groups from other streets. As a result, fighting became their initial and primary mode of interaction. However, Jones recalls at some point "starting to invite each other to play football and basketball" and sports quickly became their outlet. Boston at this time, and Roxbury in specific, was a hub of athletic talent, especially within the African-American community. Track and basketball were the most popular of sports not only because they provided entertainment and an outlet, but also they provided quite possibly the best opportunity for low-income individuals to acquire a college-level education.

Jones became part of a local basketball team composed of athletes from different high schools across the city. Not only would this lead to increased exposure and access to different 'territories' of Boston for Jones, but the team also traveled to Maine, New Hampshire, and Rhode Island. Within Boston, Jones participated in leagues at the YMCA on Huntington Avenue and he and his friends would frequent Madison Park and Columbus Park (Carter Playground).

== Education ==
As a youth, Jones attended Boston Public Schools such as the Dudley School (closed) and the Timilty School.

Jones chose to attend Winston-Salem State University in Winston-Salem, North Carolina because of the school's connection and draw to Boston athletes at the time. As Boston schools such as English High School and Boston Tech had such notable track programs, they naturally became a recruiting hotbed. During one recruiting visit to Boston, the Winston-Salem track coach mentioned the school's need for a solid, smaller basketball player on their team and Jones was that player.

At Winston-Salem, he was a four-year letterman in basketball and was a member of WSSU's first championship team in any sport - the 1953 CIAA Champion basketball team. In addition to basketball, Jones was a two-year track and field letterman and served as the manager of the WSSU football team for three years. He was later inducted into WSSU's C.E. "Big House" Gaines Athletic Hall of Fame "for his outstanding accomplishments as a basketball student athlete." While at Winston-Salem, he was close friends with many individuals from Boston, including Louis Farrakhan.

== Career ==
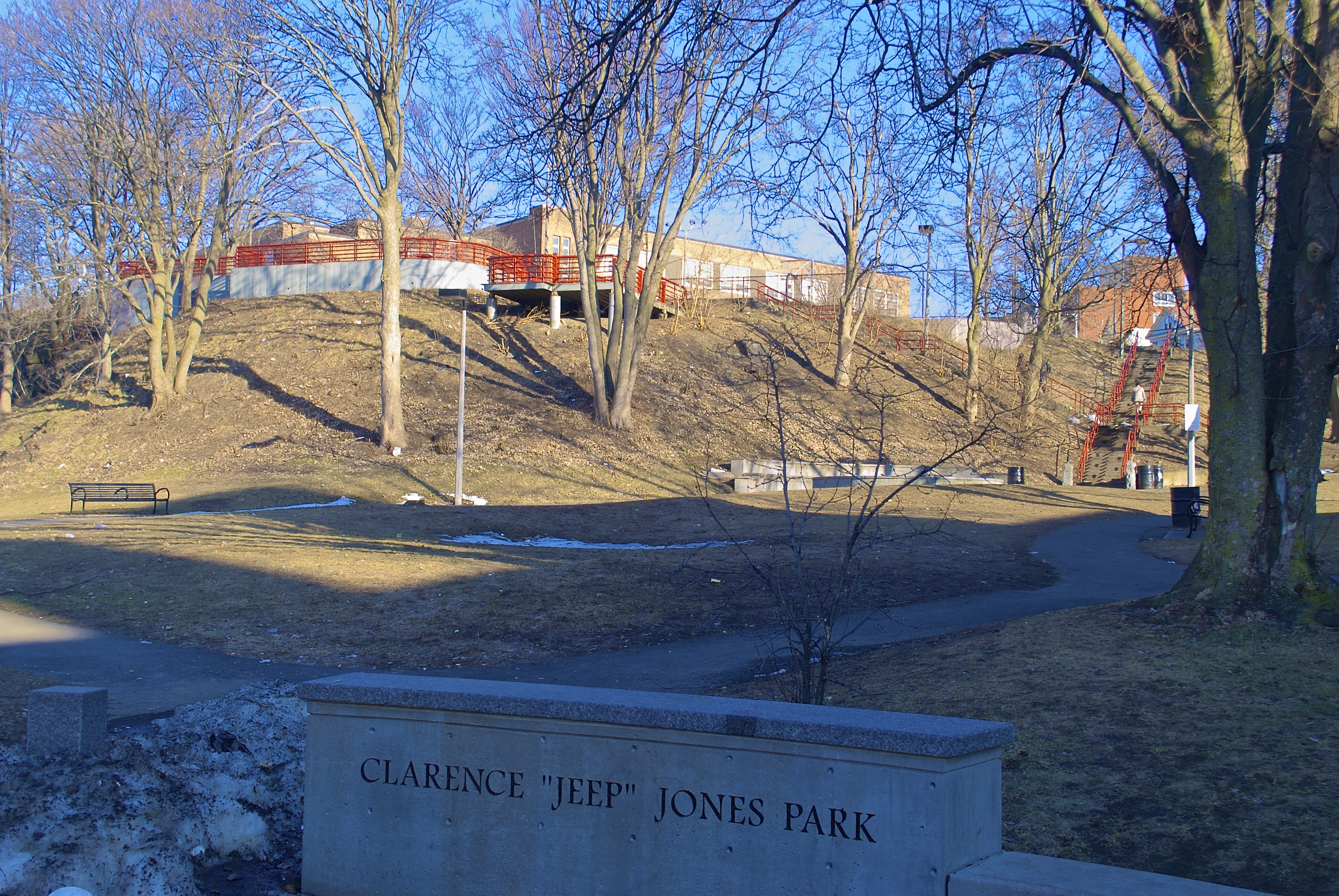
Clarence "Jeep" Jones Park

After graduation from college, Jones served 2 years in the United States Army.

He returned to Roxbury. He taught at the Dearborn School during the day and as a gym instructor at the Norfolk House by night. He then moved on to a position as a youth worker - Jones called himself a street worker - for the city and was promoted to a supervisory position.

In 1965, he became a youth probation officer in the juvenile court system. Jones worked in the juvenile court from 1965 to 1968 before being asked by Mayor Kevin White to work for him. More promotions followed, including a stint as head of the office of human rights, but he always remained close to Roxbury youth and basketball coaching. Jones worked for the mayor coordinating youth activities before continuing on to serve as the Deputy Mayor of Boston from 1968 to 1981.

Jones had many notable firsts as a city employee, including being the first African-American street worker, juvenile probation officer, deputy mayor, and chairman of the BRA. He served on the board of the BRA from 1981 to 2013 and acted as the chairman since 1989. He was "a central figure in the building renaissance that has transformed Boston's skyline as well as its myriad residential neighborhoods in the interim." Working as deputy mayor during White's second term, Jones served as a moderator between black community leaders and the city administration during the Boston busing desegregation controversy.

In 1988, Jones was on the board of the BRA and involved with giving the Dudley Street Neighborhood Initiative, a non-profit organization, power of eminent domain and control of development within a 30-acre area for various purposes. This was the first time in the country that this power had been given to a nonprofit group. Jones later assisted with mayor Ray Flynn's efforts to better connect certain neighborhoods of Boston with the developing downtown area. Mayor Flynn's efforts led to the inclusion of "a greater diversity of people" with a design to improve neglected areas of the city. "He has had a fabulous career here in our city and is a great role model not only for the kids here today, but for all the kids across the city...A role model for all the young people of Boston, he is one of those fine individuals we have who understands the neighborhood of Boston and who understands kids." - Boston Mayor Thomas Menino at the reopening of "Jeep" Jones Park in June 2010

== Recognition ==
- He was awarded an honorary doctorate in public service from Northeastern University in 2005.
- There is a park named in his honor located in Roxbury that was opened in 2010.
