= Martin Eichinger =

American sculptor

Martin Eichinger (born 1949) is an American sculptor. Deemed one of the few 'Living Masters' by the Art Renewal Center, Eichinger is known for his bronze narrative sculptures that, as he puts it, "chronicle the eternal human pursuit of meaning, happiness, and growth." Eichinger has been sculpting for over 40 years and is represented by many elite galleries across the country. He currently lives in Portland, Oregon and is an active and influential figure in the Northwestern sculpting community.

== Biography ==
Martin Eichinger was born in Michigan in 1949. His father was a graphic artist, though Eichinger claims that his 7th grade teacher, Mr. Hop (James Hopfensperger), was the person that first inspired his interest in the idea of a cultural renaissance and in art as a significant part of it.

Eichinger earned an Associate Degree at Ferris State University in Commercial Art and a B.S. in Advertising. He then went on to attend Michigan State University to pursue a Master’s degree in Sculpture. He completed a year and a half of the program but never received his degree, dropping out after receiving the commission for the Windlord monument.

Since his start as a professional sculptor, Eichinger has won many prestigious awards, including First Place in Sculpture at the International Art Renewal Center Salon in 2007 and a C. Percival Dietsch Award, "Best Sculpture in the Round" from the National Sculpture Society in 2003. He has also won grants from such institutions as the Kellogg Fellowship and the National Endowment for the Arts.

Eichinger is also very involved in the sculpting community. He is a member of the National Sculpture Society, a founding member of the Pacific Northwest Sculpture Association, and a founder and faculty-member at Fire and Earth Art Center, located in Portland, Oregon.

== Early work ==
Eichinger’s professional career began with the Windlord. Fresh out of college, he ambitiously convinced the Lansing, Michigan mayor and council to commission a sculpture to commemorate the bicentennial. The sculpture is a 16-foot tall bronze abstract eagle displayed at the city’s Riverfront Park. It has remained there to this day, however, there are plans to relocate it to a more prominent location on Michigan Avenue between Lansing and East Lansing.

Early in his career, Eichinger’s interest in science merged with his artistic endeavors. He began designing science displays for Lansing’s Impression 5 Science Center, other science centers around the country and later OMSI, after moving to Portland, Oregon.

== Bronze Sculpture ==
Eichinger is most known for his bronze sculpture. He defines his work as narrative sculpture: "I am a narrative artist. The language I use is form and anatomy, but what I try to sculpt is romantic, emotional, and perhaps mythic art," says Eichinger.

Eichinger’s work is usually grouped into themes that explore different aspects of human life. His works are produced in series and thematically grouped: Man and Technology, Circus, Duet, Dream, Exotic Women, Goddess, Post Modern, Mythic Man, and Passage. In the Duet Series, he examines the nature of loving, committed relationships. The Passage Series deals with transcendence, the ability and strength to move beyond difficult times. The stories depicted in each of these sculptures are more than simple narratives: they contain opinions and lead to conclusions." Of his themes Eichinger says, "[I] want sculptures to be mythological in that they speak to others who, like me, are formulating new values and are looking for a new sense of meaning in art and in life."

== New and Other Work ==
After a long career in bronze sculpture, Eichinger has mainly retired from the medium. In 2020, he began exploring working with poured epoxy resin. He is currently working on a collection of Amorphous Polymers for his newest project, The Clair Collection. In this new collection, Eichinger still carries narrative and abstract elements like his previous sculpture work, but The Clair Collection is more in tune with his personal interests regarding scientific news and galactic imagery.

Eichinger also owns The Geode, a building for artists and technological innovators. This unique space sits on Division St. in the Southeast Division/Clinton neighborhood in Portland, Oregon. The building itself was built to resemble a Geode. From the street, you can see one of Martin Eichinger’s kinetic pieces of art, “The Lightblade” a 35-foot light piece that loops changing colors and patterns that runs along the height of the building. The Geode also houses Eichinger’s studio, Eichinger Sculpture Studio, and his gallery space, Art at the Geode.

== Commissions ==
Eichinger’s recent commissions include busts of the former Prime Minister of Lebanon, Rafik Hariri, Past Sovereign Inspector General, James (Jim) Taylor, and Current Sovereign Inspector General, Gary Kuny.

Eichinger's most significant commission in recent years was the Stations of the Cross at Cloisters on the Platte. This project included a team of sculptors who created about 90 figures averaging 7' tall. The magnitude of this commission has been compared to the Sistine Chapel. Participating sculptors included: Martin Eichinger, George Lundeen , Mark Lundeen, Bets Lundeen, Lynn Kircher , Jay Warren , Anne LaRose , Joey Bainer , Rob Arps , Dee Clements and a long list of assistants.

== Professional Affiliations ==
- Elected Fellow, National Sculpture Society
- Founding Member Pacific Northwest Sculptors
- Member, International Sculpture Center
- Member, Allied Artists of America
- Elected Living Master, Art Resource Center

== Awards and Grants ==
- Finalist, Art Renewal Center, 12th International ARC Salon, Sculpture - 2016
- Best in Show, Bronze, Sioux Falls SculptureWalk, Sioux Fall, SD - 2013
- Honorable Mention in Bronze, "To Love Is To Be", CityArt Walking Sculpture Tour, Mankato, MN - 2012
- Featured Artist, Best of America, Sculpture Artists Volume II - 2009-2010
- First Place, Sculpture, Art Renewal Center, International ARC Salon - 2007
- C. Percival Dietsch Award, Sculpture in the Round, National Sculpture Society - 2003
- Recipient, Grant to create interactive puppets, National Endowment for the Arts - 1982
- Kellogg Fellowship, Exploratorium, San Francisco, CA. Study of the relationship between

science and art under Frank Oppenheimer - 1981

== Commissions ==
- Cloisters on the Platte, Stations of the Cross #6 & #8, multiple monumental bronze sculptures, Sarpy County, Nebraska - 2018
- Hariri Foundation, Bust of Rafic Hariri, Former Prime Minister of Lebanon, Georgetown University, Washington, D.C. - 2017
- Scottish Rite Masonic Temple, Bust of Jim Taylor, SGIG Emeritus, Portland, OR - 2015
- Scottish Rite Masonic Temple, Bust of Gary Kuney, SGIG, Portland, OR - 2015
- Lisa Doell Memorial, Relief sculpture, highly publicized hit-and-run victim, Lake Oswego, OR - 1997
- Portrait bust and high-relief sculpture - Ronald Reagan, 1995, 1996
- Sculpture - 10th Mountain Division of the U.S. Army, 50th anniversary, 1993
- Relief sculpture - Spain ‘92 Columbus Commemorative, 1991

== Museum Projects ==
- Consultant, "The Universe Within: An Exhibition of Ourselves", 80 hands-on science displays, Science Museum of Richmond, Richmond, VA - 1990-2000
- Exhibits Consultant, Designer & Engineer, South Carolina State Museum, Charleston, SC - 1990-2000
- Exhibits Designer, "Hands-On" Laser Gyro demonstrations, Roper Science Center, Greenville, SC - 1990-2000
- Exhibits Designer, OMSI, Portland, OR - 1984-1990
- Exhibits Designer, Consultant, Engineer, Impression 5, Lansing, MI - 1979-1984
