= Through the Shelter of Love =

1994 sculpture by Jane DeDecker in Salt Lake City, Utah, U.S.

- Artist: Jane DeDecker
- Year: 1994
- Medium: Bronze sculpture
- Location: Salt Lake City, Utah, United States
- 40°45′49.8″N 111°53′25.2″W

Through the Shelter of Love is a 1994 bronze sculpture by Jane DeDecker, installed in Salt Lake City, Utah, United States. The artwork depicts a family of six (including one man, one woman, and four children) playing the game London Bridge.
