= Clarence Dietsch =

American sculptor

C. Percival Dietsch (23 May 1881 - 22 Feb 1961), full name Clarence Percival Dietsch, was an American born in New York City and raised in The Bronx, NY, as the youngest child of Morris Dietsch and New York-born Clara M. Dietsch (maiden name Henry). Morris and his twin brother Leonard were born in America to Frederick and Margaret Dietsch (maiden name unknown) after they emigrated with other children of theirs from Germany in 1836.

Dietsch was awarded the Rinehart Prize in Sculpture in 1905 from the Peabody Institute and received a scholarship to attend the American Academy in Rome. Correspondence from Dietsch is included in the papers of William Henry Rinehart. He was named a Fellow of the American Academy of Rome in 1909.

He lived in Rome from Nov. 1906–1910. He then lived in Paris for a short time and won the Prix de Rome. Continuing to travel, he sailed back to New York from Naples upon the RMS Saxonia (1899) on Oct. 6, 1912. He had a passport obtained from Berne, Switzerland on Aug. 1, 1914. He was awarded honorable mention for exhibitions at the Panama–Pacific International Exposition in San Francisco in 1915.

He registered for the draft for World War I in New York on September 12, 1918, with the registrar describing him as tall in height and slender of build, with brown eyes and dark brown hair. Shortly thereafter on Oct. 24, 1918, he embarked upon the SS Espagne (Provence, 1909) en route to France to assist Winifred Holt as an instructor for soldiers blinded in battle, with the passport clerk describing him as 6 feet tall with a small scar on the palm of his left hand.

In addition to New York City, Dietsch lived in Connecticut for a time (as his father had a home in Saybrook) and as of 1935 was living in Palm Beach, Florida, where he died in 1961.

Dietsch studied at the New York School of Art under William Merritt Chase and was also a student of Attilio Piccirilli. He was a member of the Architectural League of New York as well as such Palm Beach institutions as the Society of Four Arts and the Everglades Club.

Since 1968, The National Sculpture Society, of which he was also a member, has awarded the C. Percival Dietsch Prize for sculpture in the round in his honor at its annual exhibition. A piece by Dietsch entitled "Nude Female" was sold at Sotheby's on March 11, 2004.

== C. Percival Dietsch Prize for Sculpture in the Round ==
Beginning in 1968, the National Sculpture Society has awarded this annually, with some exceptions. Below is the list of recipients.

1968 Vincent Glinsky

1969 Frances Lamont

1970 Clark T. Bailey

1971 Adolph Block

1972 Christopher Parks

1973 Joan Bugbee

1974 George Gach

1975 Edward Widstrom

1976 Cleo Hartwig

1977 Marilyn Newmark

1978 John Cavanaugh

1979 Kent Ullberg

1980 Albert Wein

1981 Marc Mellon

1982 Marion Roller

1983 Isidore Margulies

1984 Ruth Nickerson

1985 Harry Marinsky

1986 Jane Armstrong

1987 No prizes awarded

1988 Sidney Simon

1989 Jida Wang

1990 No prizes awarded

1991 Darlis Lamb

1992 Nathaniel Kaz

1993 Harvey Weiss

1994 Joseph Sheppard

1995 Ellen Kennelly

1996 Seiji Saito

1997 Vitaliy Patrov

1998 No prize awarded

1999 Bobbiegita Walker

2000 Chapel

2001 Tim Shinabarger

2002 Betty Branch

2003 Martin Eichinger

2004 Tim Cherry

2005 Joy Beckner

2006 Yuko Ueno

2007 Herb Mignery

2008 Jane DeDecker

2009 Victoria Parsons

2010 David Rogers

2011 Stanley Bleifeld

2012 Rosie Irwin Price

2013 Deon Duncan

2014 Walter Matia
