= Inquilinos Boricuas en Acción =

US community development corporation

Inquilinos Boricuas En Acción
- Abbreviation: IBA
- Formation: 1967
- Headquarters: 2 San Juan St. Boston, Massachusetts 02118
- Key people: Bienvenido De Jesus, Gilberto Ayala, Frieda Garcia
- Website: ibaboston.org

Founded in 1967, Inquilinos Boricuas en Acción (IBA) is a community development corporation whose goal is to make sure the residents of Villa Victoria in South End, Boston keep long term control over their housing and neighborhood. They offer many programs for community development and organization, such as art, culture, and human services for the neighborhood. They hope to empower the growing Latino community in Boston's South End, most notably the Villa Victoria section.

== History ==
IBA began in South End neighborhood of Boston as a grassroots movement to fight the Boston Redevelopment Authority's urban renewal plan. In 1968, a year after forming the IBA, they had established their own housing plan given to the Boston Housing Authority and renamed themselves the "Emergency Tenants Council." A year later, they were given the rights to develop on the parcel of land that is now Villa Victoria, and changed their name to "Inquilinos Boricuas en Acción", or "Puerto Rican Tenants in Action". This was considered a large accomplishment in terms of affordable housing, community organizing, and civil rights as they gave birth to a new community of not only Puerto Rican tenants, but Latinos of all cultures.

== Goals ==
The goal of IBA is to empower to the residents of the neighborhood through arts, education, workforce development, and affordable housing communities. IBA aims to preserve safe and culturally diverse housing communities. IBA seeks community involvement and direct representation, leadership and planning, reinforcement of cultural pride, and effective organization around community needs to achieve these goals.

== Villa Victoria ==
Villa Victoria, or Victory Village, is located in Boston's growing South End neighborhood. It is a housing community that contains 667 low income housing units, as well as various commercial and community spaces such as restaurants, community centers, markets, and retail stores. The area was developed by 1976 in four different phases; Victoria Apartments, Viviendas Apartments, South End Apartments, and Casas Borinquen Apartments. The properties in Villa Victoria have been renovated in the past ten years using funds from the Low-Income Housing Tax Credit program and the Section 8 Mark Up To Market program.

== Programs ==
Education

- Preschool
- After School & Summer Learning Program
- Youth Development Program

Economic development

- College and Workforce Development Program
- Resident Services Program
- Sustainable Housing Communities

Technology and arts

- Community Technology Center
- IBA Arts Program
