= Statue of Harriet Tubman (DeDecker) =

Statue by Jane DeDecker

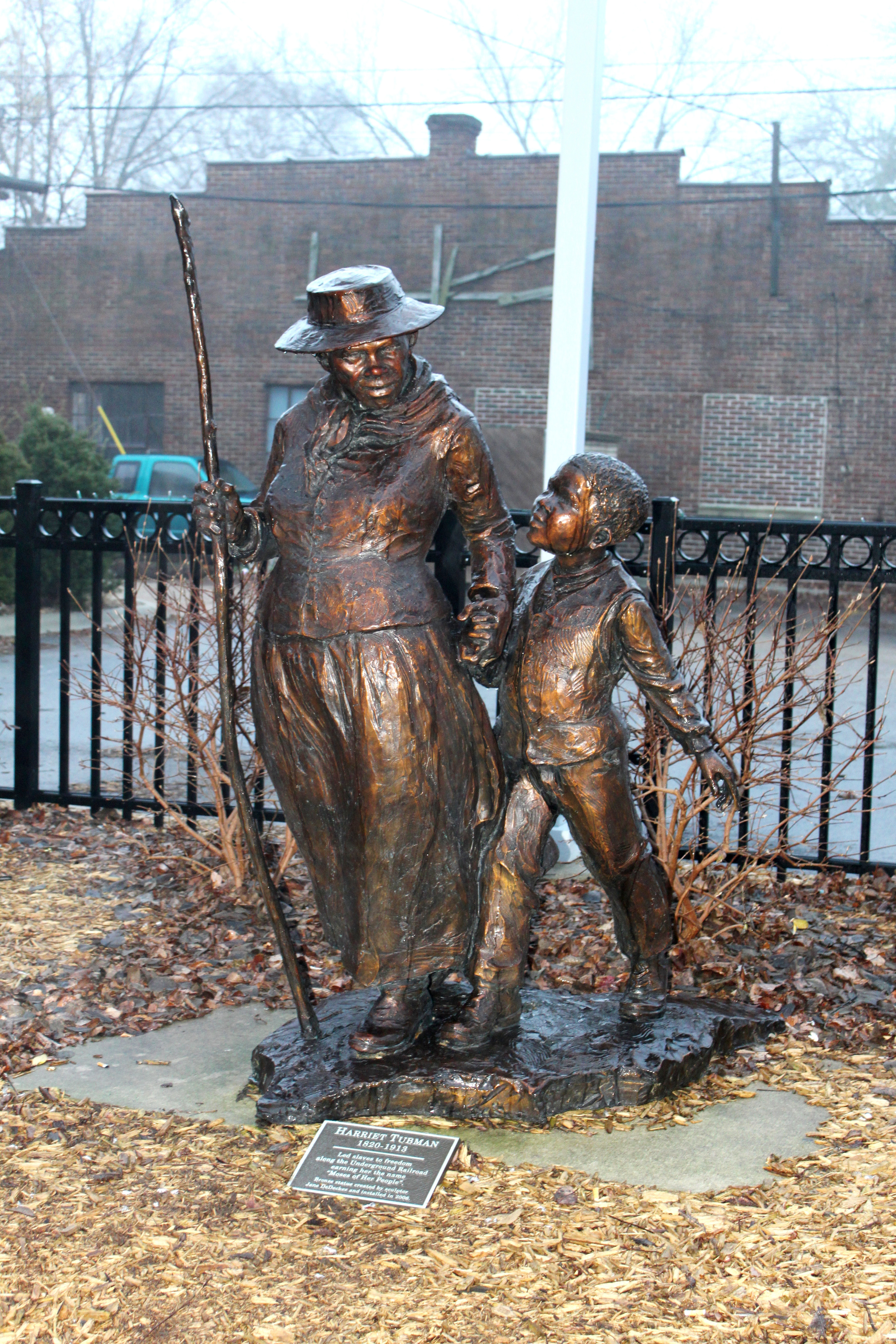
- Artist: Jane DeDecker
- Year: 2006
- Type: bronze
- Location: Ypsilanti, Michigan, USA; 42°14′26″N 83°36′56″W

A statue of Harriet Tubman created by artist Jane DeDecker honors the life of abolitionist Harriet Tubman. The bronze statue depicts Tubman walking and holding the hand of a young boy.

There are several installations of identical copies of the statue, in Ypsilanti, Michigan, in Little Rock, Arkansas, in Gainesville, Georgia, and in Mesa, Arizona.

== Installations ==
The statue was made in an edition of seven. Critics have noted that the statue's expression suggests Tubman's "gentle caring manner and generosity."

The statue in Ypsilanti, Michigan, was unveiled on 21 May, 2006, as part of a redevelopment of a plaza adjacent to the Ypsilanti District Library. Two years later, the library board added a plaque to the statue describing Tubman's life and achievements as a response to local queries about the statue; the original plaque was located at the base of the rear of the statue in an area difficult to read easily. The plaque and statue commemorate Ypsilanti's connection to the Underground Railroad.

The one in Little Rock, Arkansas, was originally placed in Little Rock's Riverfront Park; however, during the construction of the Game and Fish Nature Center in the park it was relocated to the entrance of Clinton Presidential Center as part of a series of six pieces of art lining a walkway from the downtown area of Little Rock to the Presidential Center.

The one in Gainesville, Georgia, is located at the entrance to Thurmond–McRae Lecture Hall on the campus of Brenau University. Its installation was the first instance of an educational institution in the southern United States honoring Tubman in such a visible way. A further identical statue is located on the campus of Brenau University in Gainesville, Georgia.
