= Westborough State Hospital =

Historical hospital in Massachusetts

- Commonwealth of Massachusetts

Geography
- Location: Westborough, Massachusetts, United States
- Coordinates: 42°18′4″N 71°36′37″W

Services
- Emergency department: No

History
- Former name: Westborough Insane Hospital
- Opened: 1884
- Closed: 2010

Links
- Lists: Hospitals in Massachusetts
- Westborough State Hospital
- U.S. National Register of Historic Places
- U.S. Historic district
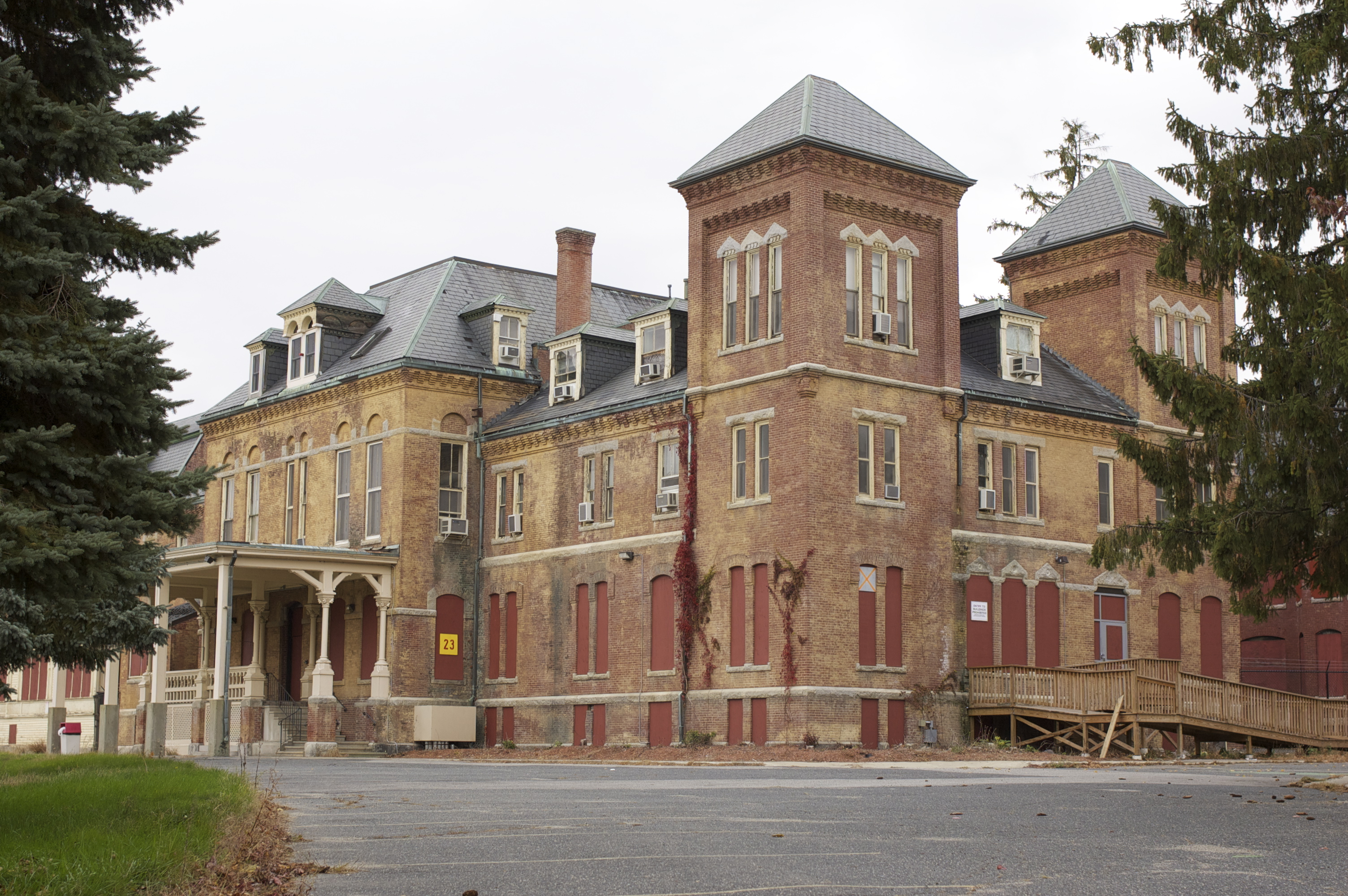
- A shuttered building at Westborough State Hospital

- Location within Massachusetts Location within the United States
- Location: Westborough, Massachusetts
- Built: 1848
- Architect: Elias Carter; Kendall, Taylor & Stevens
- Architectural style: Mid 19th Century Revival, Colonial Revival, Bungalow/Craftsman
- MPS: Massachusetts State Hospitals And State Schools MPS
- NRHP reference No.: 93001488
- Added to NRHP: January 21, 1994

Westborough State Hospital, originally "Westborough Insane Hospital", was a historic hospital in Westborough, Massachusetts, which sat on more than 600 acres (240 ha). The core campus area was located between Lyman Street and Chauncy Lake, north of Massachusetts Route 9. The hospital was added to the National Register of Historic Places in 1994.

The hospital was established in 1884 on the grounds of the State Reform School for Boys. The existing buildings were renovated to accommodate the needs of a mental hospital and was opened on December 1, 1886. This was the first State homeopathic hospital for the insane established in New England; but such hospitals existed in New York, Michigan, and perhaps other states.

The pioneering African-American psychiatrist Solomon Carter Fuller spent the majority of his career practicing at the hospital in the early 1900s. While there, he performed his ground-breaking research on the physical changes to the brains of Alzheimer's disease patients.

The hospital was closed in 2010, in anticipation of a new Worcester State Hospital opening in 2012. The ten-bed Deaf Unit, the two Adolescent Units, and the Intensive Residential Treatment Program (one step below State Hospital Level) programs were closed by June 2010.

On May 9, 2015, a memorial service was held in nearby Pine Grove Cemetery for the more than 500 patients who died at Westborough State Hospital and whose remains were unclaimed and subsequently buried in a potter's field. The service was part of a larger effort to put names to the graves of the deceased. Despite being on the historic register, the entire hospital complex was demolished during the summer of 2019. A senior living complex is currently being built at the same location as the state hospital was.

== See also ==
- National Register of Historic Places listings in Worcester County, Massachusetts

== General References ==
1. Westborough State Hospital (website dedicated to the facility)
2. Annual Reports of the Westborough Insane Hospital (1885–1911, 1926–1936)
3. Annual Reports of the State Board of Health of Massachusetts (1875–1914)
4. Annual Reports of the State Board of Health, Lunacy and Charity (1879–1896)
