= Emancipation (sculpture) =

Bronze statue in Boston, Massachusetts, U.S.

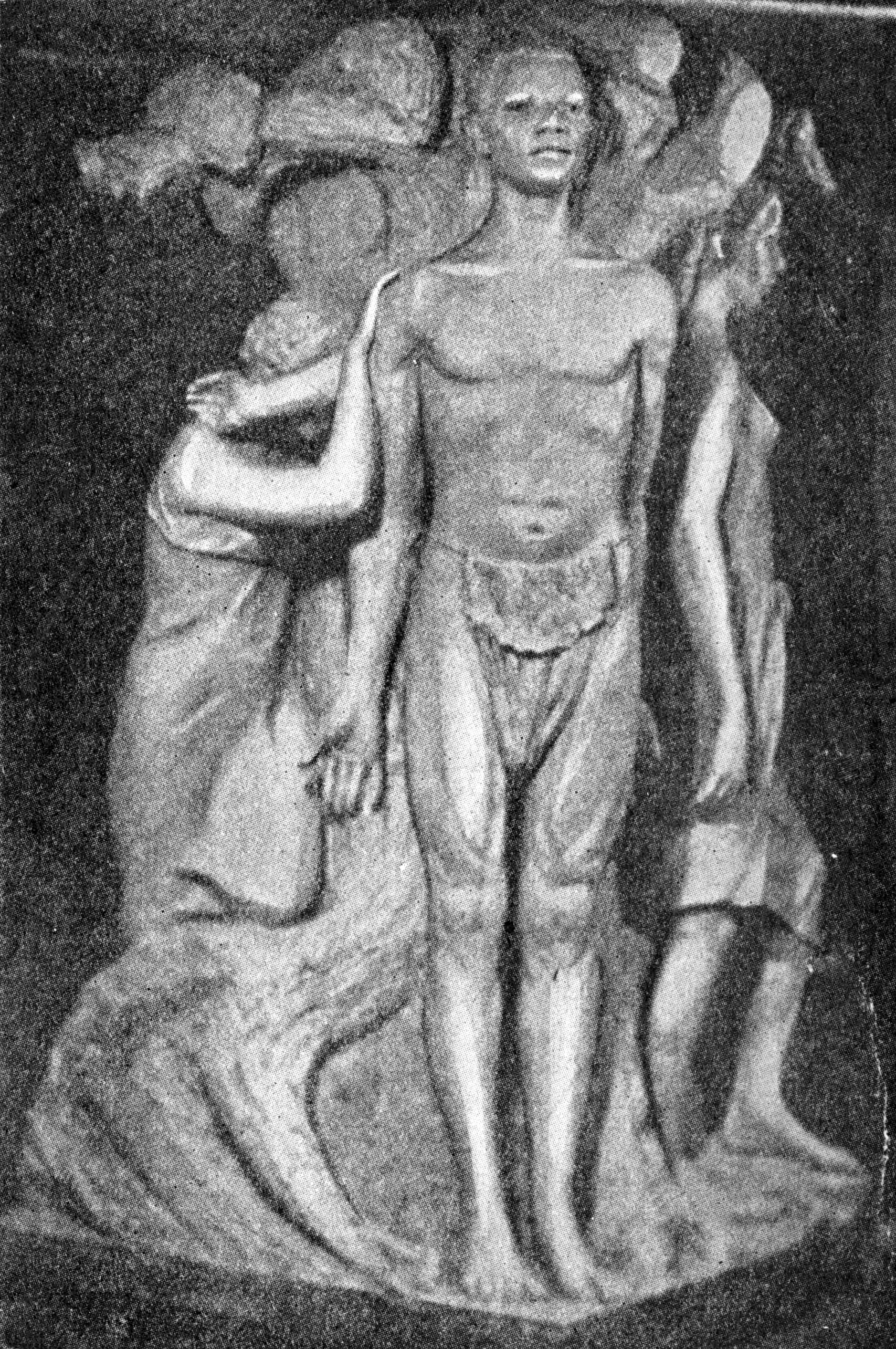
- Artist: Meta Vaux Warrick Fuller
- Year: 1913
- Type: bronze
- Location: Boston, Massachusetts; 42°20′36″N 71°04′40″W

Emancipation is a bronze statue located in Harriet Tubman Park in South End, Boston, Massachusetts.

The statue was created in plaster in 1913 by artist Meta Vaux Warrick Fuller to commemorate the 50th anniversary of the Emancipation Proclamation, the order which abolished slavery in the United States. In 1999 it was cast in bronze and placed in Harriet Tubman Park. In 2013, quotes from Fuller describing emancipation were engraved on the base.
