= Harriet Tubman Memorial (Boston) =

Memorial in Boston

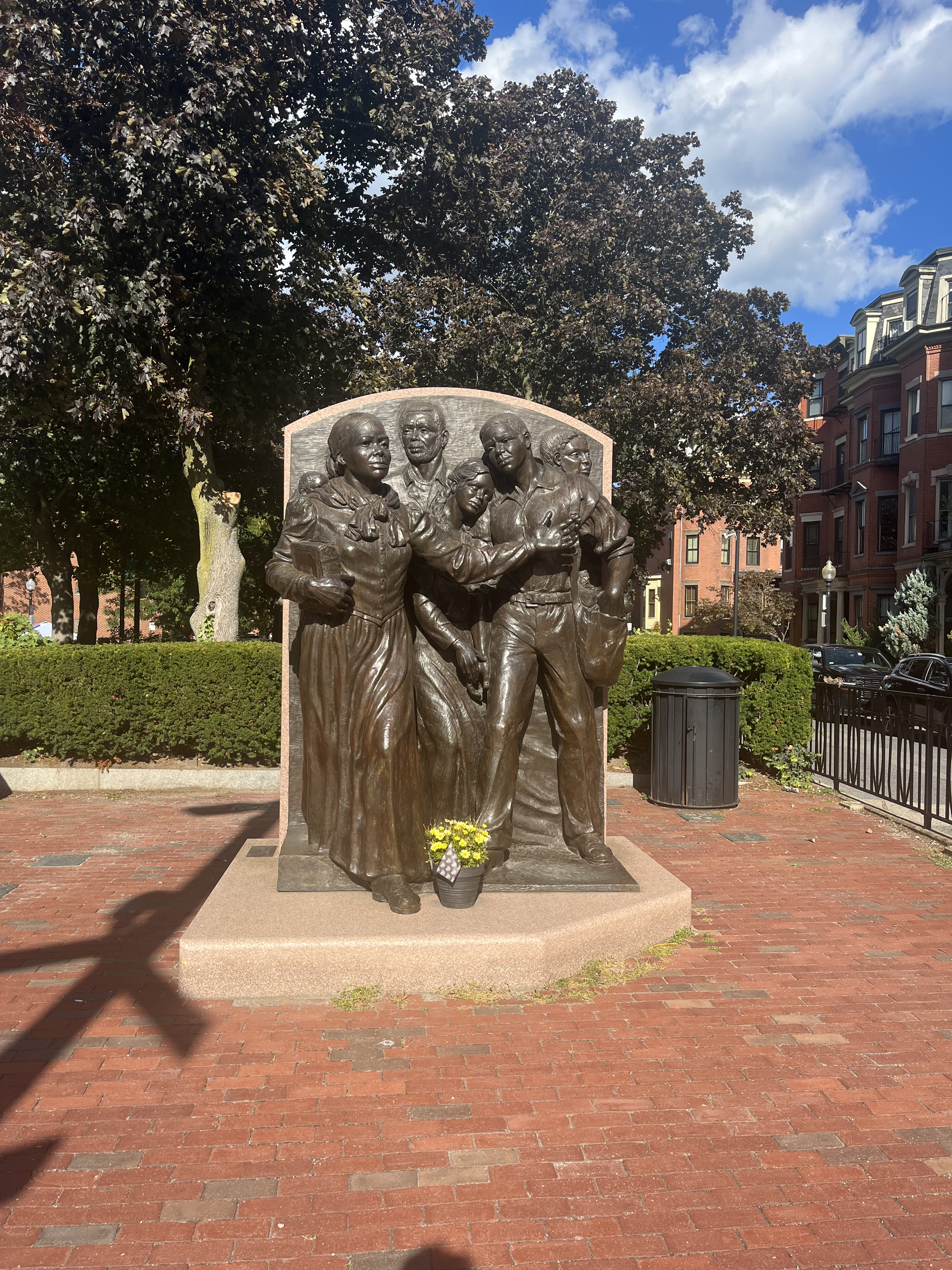
- Artist: Fern Cunningham
- Year: 1999
- Type: bronze
- Location: Boston, Massachusetts; 42°20′36″N 71°04′41″W

The Harriet Tubman Memorial, also known as Step on Board, is located in Harriet Tubman Park in the South End neighborhood of Boston, Massachusetts. It honours the life of abolitionist Harriet Tubman. It was the first memorial erected in Boston to a woman on city-owned property.

The memorial is a 10-foot tall bronze sculpture by artist Fern Cunningham and depicts Tubman leading a small group of people. She holds a Bible under her right arm. The figures are backed by a vertical slab, on the reverse of which is a diagram of the route Tubman took when accompanying passengers on the Underground Railroad, and several quotes by and about Tubman.

The inscription on the back of the memorial reads:

Step On Board
HARRIET ROSS TUBMAN
1820 - 1913

Go Down Moses, Way Down in Egypt's Land,
Tell Old Pharoah - Let My People Go

There are two things I've got a right to,
and these are death or liberty. One or another
I mean to have. No one will take me back alive.
—Harriet Tubman

The midnight sky and the silent stars have been the
witnesses of your devotion to freedom and of your heroism.
—Frederick Douglass

Tell my brothers to be always watching unto prayer,
and when the good old ship of Zion comes along,
to be ready to step aboard.
—Harriet Tubman

She expected deliverance when she prayed,
unless the Lord had ordered otherwise.
—Sarah Bradford

Locations along the Underground Railroad are shown along an arc: Canada, Rochester, Syracuse, Albany, New York City, Philadelphia, Delaware, and Maryland.
