= Fern Cunningham =

American sculptor (1949–2020)

- Born: January 24, 1949; New York City
- Died: August 19, 2020 (aged 71)
- Other name: Fern Cunningham-Terry
- Education: Boston University
- Occupation: Sculptor

Fern Cunningham (24 January 1949 – 19 August 2020) was an American sculptor. One of her best known works is the Harriet Tubman Memorial, which was the first statue honoring a woman on city-owned land in Boston.

== Early life and education ==
Cunningham was born in New York City and grew up in Alaska and upstate New York. Her mother was an art teacher, potter, and painter, and her father worked for the Bureau of Indian Affairs as a tuberculosis specialist. She majored in sculpture at Boston University.

== Career ==
After graduating from Boston University, Cunningham stayed on in Boston and taught art at the Elma Lewis School of Fine Arts until it closed its doors in 1985. She later taught at the Park School in Brookline. She received her first major commission in the 1990s when she was hired by the Browne Fund to create a monument for the Joseph E. Lee School in Dorchester. The result was Earth Challengers, which depicts three small children holding up the globe. She was then commissioned by the city for several projects, including Family Circle (1996), a bronze sculpture on Elm Hill Avenue in Roxbury, depicting a mother and father embracing to protect their child; The Sentinel (2003), which depicts an African woman watching over the Forest Hills Cemetery; and Rise (2005), a 20-foot granite and bronze monument in Mattapan Square, which celebrates the diverse history of Mattapan.

One of her best known works is the Harriet Tubman memorial, titled Step on Board, in Boston's South End. The seven-by-ten foot bronze sculpture stands at the entrance to Harriet Tubman Park, which is a stop on the Boston Women's Heritage Trail. It depicts a young Harriet Tubman carrying a Bible, leading a small group of men and women to freedom. The figures are backed by a wall, which Cunningham said represents the "wall of bondage" from which they are emerging. Installed in 1999, it was the first memorial honoring a woman on city-owned land in Boston. Cunningham later said that one of her aims in creating the piece was to raise the question, "Who is a hero?"

Cunningham cited Auguste Rodin as a major influence, particularly his Burghers of Calais, which she saw as a student in France. Her other influences include Elizabeth Catlett, Henry Moore, Augusta Savage, and Michelangelo.

Cunningham's awards included the Beta Beta Boulé Award (2000); an Appreciation Award from the Roxbury Action Program for incorporating African-American history into her art (2003); a Drylongso Award, which honors African Americans for combating racism (2004); and the Renaissance Living Legend Award from the Boston Renaissance Charter School (2005).

Cunningham died on August 19, 2020, at the age of 71.
