= Jane DeDecker =

American sculptor

Jane DeDecker (born 30 August 1961) is a sculptor from Iowa. She specializes in bronze work and her pieces often feature family groups or children.

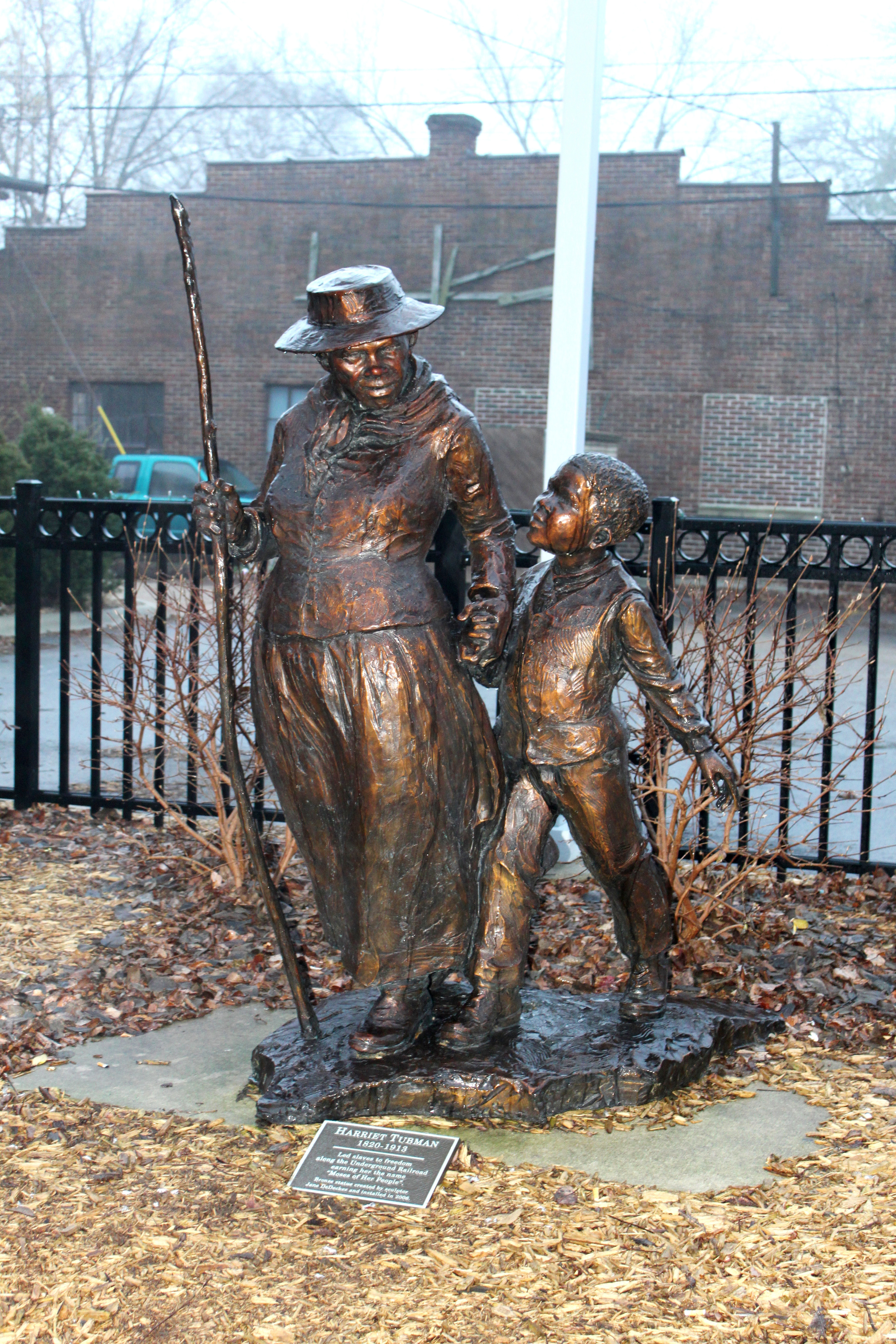
Statue of Harriet Tubman in Ypsilanti, Michigan

DeDecker was born in Marengo, Iowa on 30 August 1961 and attended the University of Northern Colorado from 1979 to 1982. She initially studied painting but a teacher introduced her to sculpture and she began to study sculpting. She also studied weaving and textiles and travelled to Paris to study at the Goeblins School of Tapestry. After graduating, she was an apprentice to sculptor George Lundeen at his sculpture studio in Loveland, Colorado. She learned the techniques of bronze casting, and after two years became a master craftsman at the studio. She also worked with Robert Zimmerman at his bronze studio where she assisted in the production of bronze monuments. DeDecker has also taught sculpture courses at the Loveland Arts Academy and the Denver Arts Students League.

In 2007 she became a Fellow of the National Sculpture Society, New York, NY. In 2008, she won the C. Percival Dietsch Prize for Sculpture in the Round.

In 2022, DeDecker was named one of USA Today's Women of the Year, which recognizes women who have made a significant impact.

== Selected works ==
- Statue of Harriet Tubman, installed in Gainesville, Georgia, Ypsilanti, Michigan and Little Rock, Arkansas
- Through the Shelter of Love, Salt Lake City
- Fountain at Cerritos Sculpture Garden, Cerritos, California
- Works in the Dale Nicholson Sculpture Garden, Little Rock, Arkansas
