= Solomon Carter Fuller =

Liberian neurologist and psychiatrist (1872–1953)

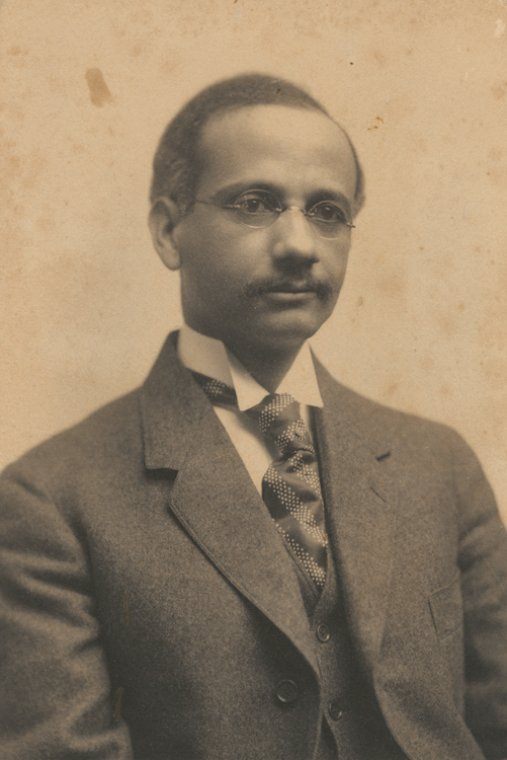
- Fuller (c. 1910)
- Born: August 11, 1872; Monrovia, Liberia
- Died: January 16, 1953 (aged 80); Framingham, Massachusetts, U.S.
- Education: Boston University School of Medicine (M.D., 1897) Livingstone College (1893)
- Occupations: Physician, psychiatrist, pathologist, professor
- Known for: Work in the field of Alzheimer's disease
- Spouse: Meta Vaux Warrick (m. 1909)
- Children: 3
- Parent(s): Solomon C. Fuller; Anna Ursala James

Solomon Carter Fuller (August 11, 1872 – January 16, 1953) was a pioneering Liberian neurologist, psychiatrist, pathologist, and professor. Born in Monrovia, Liberia, he completed his college education and medical degree (MD) in the United States. He studied psychiatry in Munich, Germany, then returned to the United States, where he worked for much of his career at Westborough State Hospital in Westborough, Massachusetts.

In 1919, Fuller became part of the faculty at Boston University School of Medicine, where he taught pathology. He made significant contributions to the study of Alzheimer's disease during his career. He also had a private practice as a physician, neurologist, and psychiatrist.

== Early life and education ==
Solomon Fuller was born on August 11, 1872, in Monrovia, Liberia, to Americo-Liberian parents of African-American descent. His father, Solomon, had become a coffee planter in Liberia and an official in its government. Fuller's mother, Anna Ursala (reported also as Ursilla or Ursula) James, was the daughter of physicians and medical missionaries. His paternal grandparents, John Lewis Fuller and his wife, had been slaves in Virginia. John Fuller bought his and his enslaved wife's freedom and they moved to the city of Norfolk, Virginia. The couple emigrated from there to Liberia in 1852, to a colony set up in West Africa by the American Colonization Society beginning earlier in the century. They helped establish the nation developed by African Americans and liberated African slaves.

Fuller's mother set up a school to teach Solomon and other children in the area. Fuller also studied at the College Preparatory School of Monrovia.

He had a keen interest in medicine given that his maternal grandparents were medical missionaries in Liberia. Fuller moved to the United States to study at Livingstone College in Salisbury, North Carolina, graduating in 1893. Later he attended Long Island College Medical School.

He completed his MD degree in 1897 from Boston University School of Medicine. It was a homeopathic institution open to students of all races and genders. He pursued further research at the Royal Psychiatric Hospital of the Ludwig-Maximilians-Universität München, Germany, conducting research under Emil Kraepelin and Alois Alzheimer.

== Career ==
Fuller spent the majority of his career practicing as a neuropathologist at Westborough State Hospital in Westborough, Massachusetts. This is where he completed a two-year internship in neuropathology prior to being selected by Alois Alzheimer to conduct novel research at the Royal Psychiatric Hospital at the Ludwig-Maximilians-Universität München, led by Emil Kraepelin. While there, Fuller performed ground-breaking research on the physical changes that occur in the brains of Alzheimer's disease patients. Approximately one year later, he returned to Westborough State Hospital with his new knowledge. He developed and edited the Westborough State Hospital Papers, a journal that began publishing results of local research.

He worked with Alois Alzheimer, the psychiatrist credited with publishing the first case of presenile dementia. While working as a clinical pathologist, Fuller noted that amyloid plaques and neurofibrillary tangles may be significant biomarkers for the study of Alzheimer's disease, separate from arteriosclerosis, the then-assumed cause of disease.

Fuller worked with patients with chronic alcoholism, noting the neuropathology of the disease. In 1909, Fuller was a speaker at the Clark University Conference organized by G. Stanley Hall, which was attended by such notable scientists and intellectuals as anthropologist Franz Boaz, psychiatrists Sigmund Freud and Carl Jung, philosopher William James, and Nobel laureates Ernest Rutherford and Albert A. Michelson. Fuller's seminal publications, a two-part review of Alzheimer's disease, came in 1912 and was the first English translation of the first Alzheimer's case. Many of Fuller's contributions to the scientific literature were forgotten for decades, but his discoveries continue to guide research today. One 21st century researcher wrote that Fuller's discoveries had led to such "a major contribution to the body of clinical knowledge concerning Alzheimer's disease" that the neurodegenerative disease would have been named for him if Kraepelin had not insisted it be named for Alzheimer, Kraepelin's student.

In 1919, Fuller left Westborough State Hospital to join the faculty at Boston University School of Medicine. He served as an associate professor until 1933, at which time he left academia after recognizing racial disparities in the salary and promotion processes of his time. Upon retirement from academia, however, he received the title of Emeritus Professor of Neurology at Boston University. He continued in private practice as a physician, neurologist, and psychiatrist for many years.

When the Veterans Administration opened the Tuskegee Veterans Administration Medical Center after World War I with an entirely black staff, Fuller was instrumental in recruiting and training black psychiatrists for key positions.

== Personal life ==
For most of his life, Fuller lived in Framingham, Massachusetts with his wife, the sculptor Meta Vaux Warrick Fuller. They had three children. After losing his eyesight in 1944, Fuller was unable to continue practicing and he died in Framingham on January 16, 1953, at the age of 80, due to advanced diabetes and gastrointestinal malignancy.

== Legacy and honors ==
- The Dr. Solomon Carter Fuller Mental Health Center, located at 85 E Newton Street in Boston, is named after him. It forms part of the Boston Medical Center, the primary teaching affiliate for Boston University Chobanian & Avedisian School of Medicine.
- In the early 1970s, the American Psychiatric Association established a Solomon Carter Fuller Award lecture at its annual meetings.
- Fuller Middle School, named after him and his wife, a noted sculptor, is located in Framingham, Massachusetts. The school's history reads:

The Fuller Middle School was established in September of 1994. The school is named in honor of Dr. Solomon Fuller, a psychiatrist, and his wife Meta Fuller, a sculptor. The Fullers, a pioneering African-American family, lived on Warren Road near the current location of the Fuller Middle School during the early part of the twentieth century. Dr. and Mrs. Fuller were leaders in their professions and in the Framingham Community during their lives. The roles they played during their lifetimes serve as models for the students of the school named in their memory.

- Dr. Solomon Fuller Way, on the site of the former Westborough State Hospital, is named after him.

== Works by Solomon C. Fuller ==
- "A Study Of The Neurofibrils In Dementia Paralytica, Dementia Senilis, Chronic Alcoholism, Cerebral Lues And Microcephalic Idiocy", The American Journal of Psychiatry. Volume 63, Issue 4, April 1907, pp. 415–468-13.
- "A Study of the Miliary Plaques Found in Brains of the Aged", American Journal of Insanity 28(2) (1911).
- "Alzheimer's disease (senium praecox): the report of a case and review of published cases", Journal of Nervous & Mental Disease, July 1912, Volume 39, Issue 7, pp. 440–455.
- with Henry I. Klopp, "Further Observations on Alzheimer's Disease", American Journal of Insanity 69 (1912): 26, 27.
- "Anatomic Findings of General Paresis and Multiple Sclerosis in the Same Case". Boston Society of Neurology and Psychiatry. Arch. Neurol. and Psychiat 5 (1921): 757-1921.
