= Harriet Tubman Park =

Park in Boston, Massachusetts

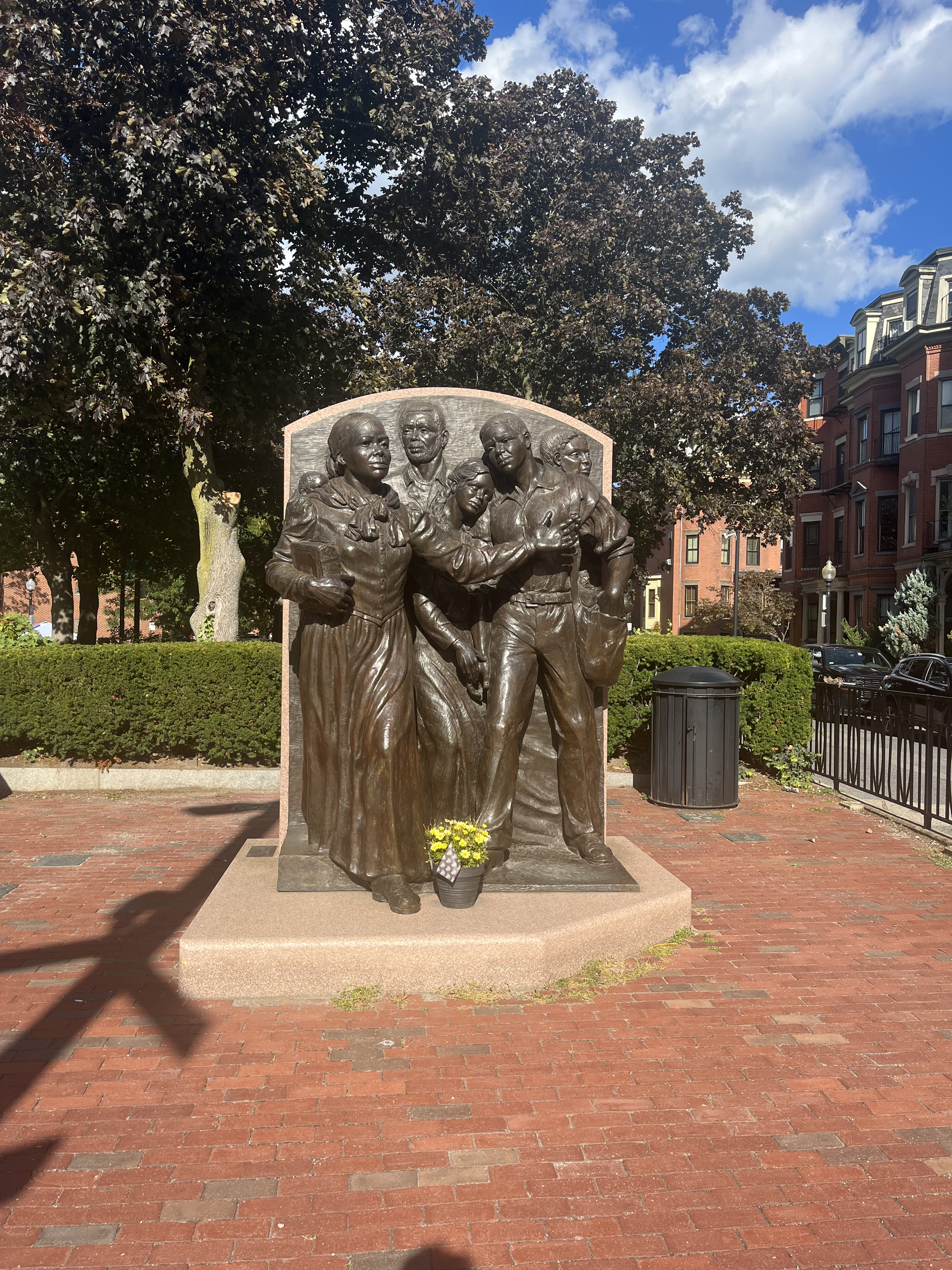
- Interactive map of Harriet Tubman Park
- Type: Urban park
- Location: Boston, Massachusetts
- Coordinates: 42°20′36″N 71°04′40″W
- Area: 0.20 acres (0.081 ha)
- Status: Open all year

Harriet Tubman Park, also known as Harriet Tubman Square, is located in the South End neighborhood of Boston, Massachusetts. It honors the life of abolitionist Harriet Tubman.

The park is located on a triangular traffic island previously known as Columbus Square, which was developed by the Boston Parks and Recreation Department with funding from the Browne Fund, the Henderson Foundation and the New England Arts Foundation.

The park's brick paving is inlaid with decorative bronze pavers which depict aspects of the story of the Underground Railroad. Located in the park are two sculptures: the Harriet Tubman Memorial, created by Fern Cunningham, and Emancipation, sculpted by Meta Vaux Warrick Fuller on the fiftieth anniversary of Lincoln's Emancipation Proclamation.

The park was designed by CBA Landscape Architects and won a Boston Society of Landscape Architects Merit Award for Design. It is a stop on the Boston Women's Heritage Trail.
