= Meta Vaux Warrick Fuller =

American artist (1877–1968)

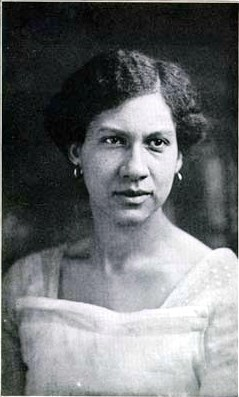
- Meta Vaux Warrick Fuller in 1910
- Born: Meta Vaux Warrick; June 9, 1877; Philadelphia, Pennsylvania, U.S.
- Died: March 13, 1968 (aged 90) (Note: The Boston Globe reported her death on March 13, with a funeral service scheduled for Friday, March 15. Some sources give her death as March 18, 1968,); Framingham, Massachusetts, U.S.
- Education: University of the Arts, College of Art and Design, Académie Colarossi, École des Beaux-Arts
- Occupations: Sculptor, painter, poet
- Movement: Harlem Renaissance
- Spouse: Solomon Carter Fuller (m. 1907; died 1953)
- Children: 3
- Parent(s): William H. Warrick; Emma Jones

Meta Vaux Warrick Fuller (/miːtə ˈvaʊ/ MEE-tə VOW; born Meta Vaux Warrick; June 9, 1877 – March 13, 1968) was an African-American artist who celebrated Afrocentric themes. At the fore of the Harlem Renaissance, Warrick was known for being a poet, painter, theater designer, and sculptor of the Black American experience. At the turn of the 20th century, she achieved a reputation as the first Black woman sculptor and was a well-known sculptor in Paris before returning to the United States.

Warrick was a protégée of Auguste Rodin, and has been described as "one of the most imaginative Black artists of her generation." Through adopting a horror-based figural style and choosing to depict events of racial injustice, like the lynching of Mary Turner, Warrick used her platform to address the societal traumas of African Americans.

== Early life ==
Meta Vaux Warrick Fuller was born in Philadelphia, Pennsylvania, on June 9, 1877. Her parents were Emma (née Jones) Warrick, an accomplished wig maker and beautician for upperclass white women, and William H. Warrick, a successful barber and caterer. Her father owned several barber shops and her mother owned her own beauty salon. Warrick was named after Meta Vaux, the daughter of Senator Richard Vaux, one of her mother's customers. Her maternal grandfather, Henry Jones, was a successful caterer in the city. Both of her parents were considered to have influential positions in African-American society.

Her family's class status was a special privilege that was afforded to them through their talent and their location. After an influx of free Blacks began making a home in Philadelphia, the available jobs were generally physically hard and low-paying. Only a few people were able to find desirable jobs as ministers, physicians, barbers, teachers, and caterers. Despite this, Warrick's parents were able to find creative success amongst the "vibrant political, cultural, and economic center" the African-American community of Philadelphia had established.

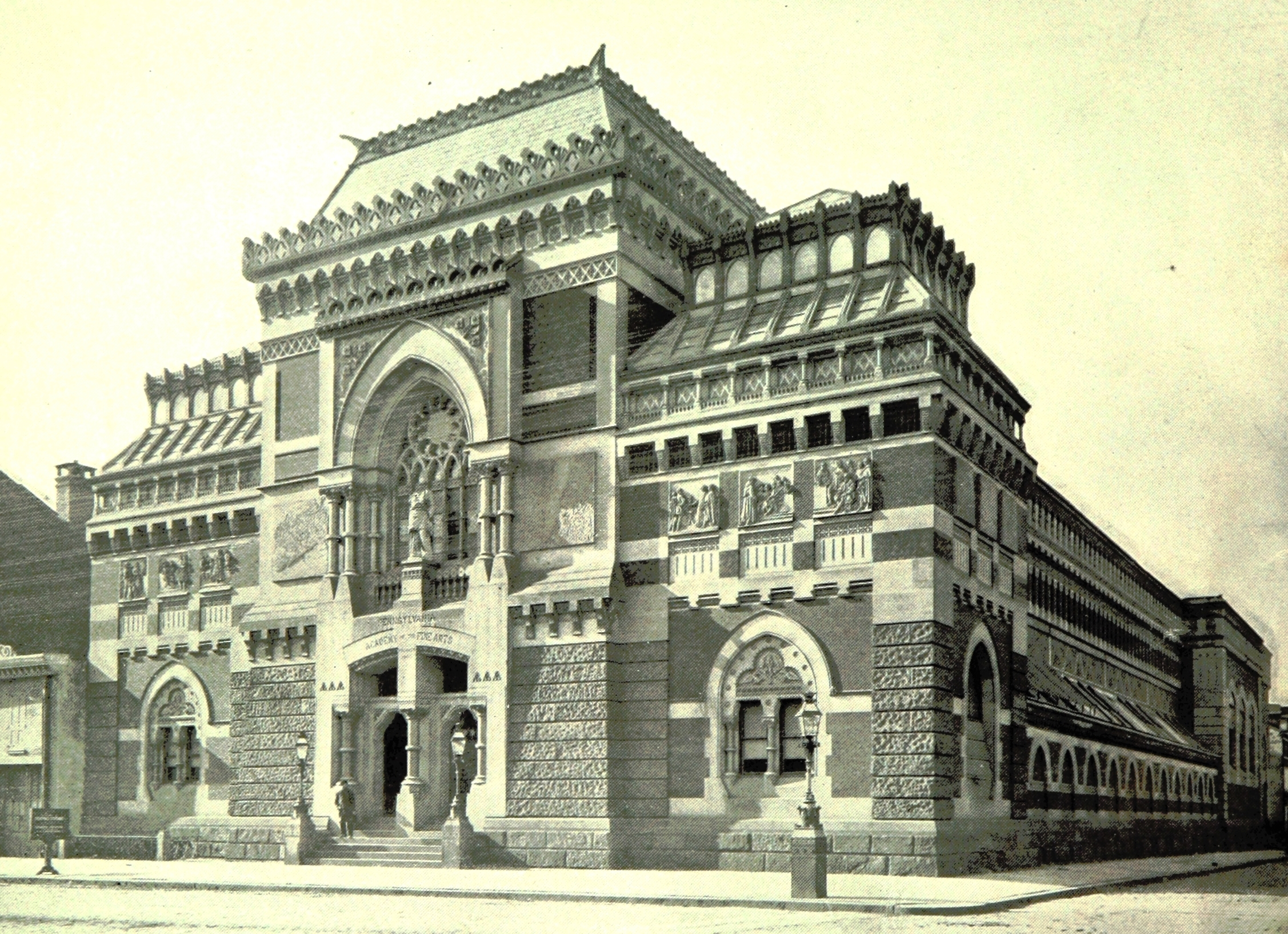
Pennsylvania Academy of the Fine Arts (c. 1895)

Due to her parents' success, she was given access to various cultural and educational opportunities. Warrick trained in art, music, dance and horseback riding. Warrick's art education and art influences began at home, nurtured from childhood by her older sister Blanche, who studied art, and visits to Pennsylvania Academy of the Fine Arts with her father, who was interested in sculpture and painting. Her older sister, who later became a beautician like their mother, kept clay that Meta was able to use to create art. She was enrolled in 1893 in the Girls' High School in Philadelphia, where she studied art as well as academic courses. Warrick was among the few gifted artists selected from the Philadelphia public schools to study art and design at J. Liberty Tadd's art program at the Public School of Industrial Art in the early 1890s.

Her brother and grandfather entertained and fascinated her with endless horror stories. These influences partly shaped her sculpture, as she eventually developed as an internationally trained artist known as "the sculptor of horrors."

== Education ==
Warrick's career as an artist began after one of her high-school projects was chosen to be included in the 1893 World's Columbian Exposition in Chicago. Based upon this work, she won a four-year scholarship to the Pennsylvania Museum and School of Industrial Art (now The University of the Arts College of Art and Design) in 1894, where her gift for sculpture emerged. In an act of independence and nonconformity as an up-and-coming woman artist, Warrick defied traditionally "feminine" themes by sculpting pieces influenced by the gruesome imagery found in the fin de siècle movement of the Symbolist era. At various times, she was a literary sculptor, at others a creator of portrait art - which she studied under Charles Grafly at the Pennsylvania Academy of the Fine Arts. Although she said that she could not specialize in African-American types, Fuller became one of the most effective chroniclers of the Black experience within the United States. In 1898, she received her Pennsylvania Museum and School of Industrial Art diploma and teacher's certificate as well as a scholarship for an additional year of study.

Upon graduation in 1899, Warrick traveled to Paris, where she studied with Raphaël Collin, working on sculpture and anatomy at the Académie Colarossi and drawing at the École des Beaux-Arts. Warrick had to deal with racial discrimination at the American Women's Club in Paris, where she was refused lodging although she had made reservations before arriving in the city. African-American painter Henry Ossawa Tanner, a family friend, found lodging for her and gave her community amongst his group of friends.

Warrick's work grew stronger in Paris, where she studied until 1902. Influenced by the conceptual realism of Auguste Rodin, she became so adept at depicting the spirituality of human suffering that the French press named her "the delicate sculptor of horrors." In 1902, she became the protege of Rodin. Of her plaster sketch entitled Man Eating His Heart, Rodin remarked, "My child, you are a sculptor; you have the sense of form in your fingers."

== Career ==
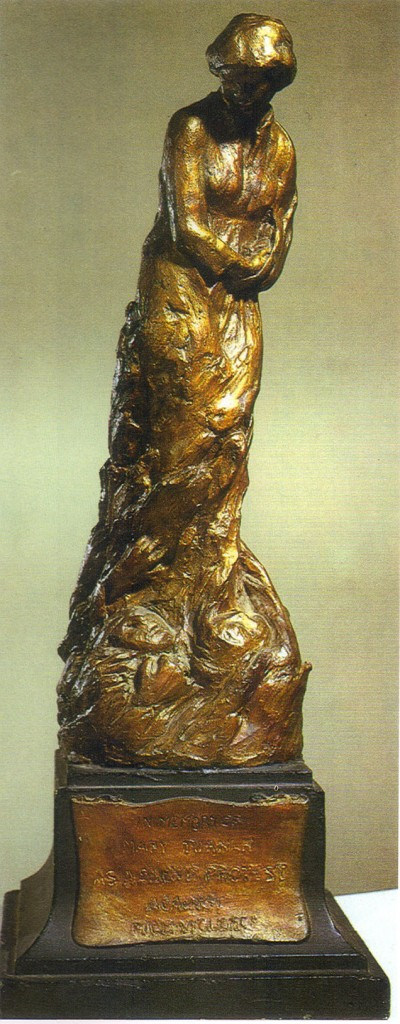
Meta Vaux Warrick Fuller, Mary Turner, painted plaster sculpture,1919

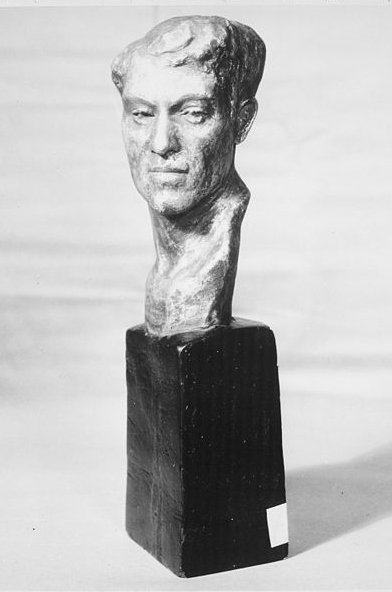
Dark Hero, National Archives and Records Administration, College Park, Maryland

Warrick created works of the African-American experience that were revolutionary. They touched on the complexities of nature, religion, identity, and nation. She is considered part of the Harlem Renaissance, a flourishing in New York of African Americans making art of various genres, literature, plays and poetry. The Danforth Museum, which received a $40,000 grant from the Henry Luce Foundation to safeguard Warrick Fuller's work, states that Fuller is "generally considered one of the first African-American female sculptors of importance."

=== Paris ===
In Paris, she met American sociologist W. E. B. DuBois, who became a lifelong friend and confidant. He encouraged Warrick to draw from African and African-American themes in her work. She met French sculptor Auguste Rodin, who encouraged her sculpting. Her real mentor was Henry Ossawa Tanner while learning from Raphaël Collin. It was the "masculinity and primitive power" of her sculptures that drew the French crowds to her work and generated her acclaim. The Paris crowd was astonished that a woman could produce works that depicted such "horror, pain, and sorrow." It was a relief for Warrick that her gender wasn't an inhibitor of how the public reacted to her racially themed pieces, as it would be in the United States. By the end of her time in Paris, she was widely known and had had her works exhibited in many galleries.

Samuel Bing, patron of Aubrey Beardsley, Mary Cassatt, and Henri de Toulouse-Lautrec, recognized her abilities by sponsoring a one-woman exhibition including Siegfried Bing's Salon de l'Art Nouveau (Maison de l'Art Nouveau). In 1903, just before Warrick returned to the United States, two of her works, The Wretched and The Impenitent Thief, were exhibited at the Paris Salon.

=== United States ===
Returning to Philadelphia in 1903, Warrick was shunned by members of the Philadelphia art scene because of her race and because her art was considered "domestic." However, Fuller became the first African-American woman to receive a U.S. government commission. For this award, she created a series of tableaux depicting African-American historical events for the Jamestown Tercentennial Exposition, held in Norfolk, Virginia in 1907. The display included fourteen dioramas and 130 painted plaster figures depicting scenes such as slaves arriving in Virginia in 1619 and the home lives of Black peoples.

Mary Turner was her response to the 1918 lynching of a young, pregnant Black woman in Lowndes County, Georgia. Fuller's contemporary, Angelina Weld Grimké, wrote the short story "Goldie" based on this murder. Warrick's activism also spanned into feminist work. She participated in the Women's Peace Party and the Equal Suffrage Movement, but abruptly stopped once she realized that Black women were not included in the fight for equal voting rights. She often sold pieces to fund voter registration campaigns in the South.

Warrick exhibited at the Pennsylvania Academy of the Fine Arts in Philadelphia in 1906. She exhibited there again in 1908. In 1910, a fire at a warehouse in Philadelphia, where she kept tools and stored numerous paintings and sculptures, destroyed her belongings; she lost 16 years' worth of work. Among her oeuvre, only a few early works stored elsewhere were preserved. The losses were emotionally devastating for her.

== Exhibitions ==
=== 1907 Jamestown Tercentennial ===
In February 1907, Warrick secured a contract to create 14 dioramas depicting the African-American experience. At the time, it was described as the "Historic Tableaux of the Negroes' Progress." Historian W. Fitzhugh Brundage has described Fuller's tableaux as one that suggested "the expansiveness of Black abilities, aspirations and experiences, [presenting] a cogent alternative to white representations of history." Warrick's tableaux were given prominent display in the Negro Building at the Jamestown Tercentennial, where they occupied 15,000 square feet. Each scene consisted of painted plaster figures and extensive painted backdrops. The 14 tableaux depicted the following: the landing of the first slaves at Jamestown; slaves at work in a cotton field; a fugitive slave in hiding; a gathering of the first African Methodist Episcopal Church; a slave defending his owner's home during the Civil War; newly freed slaves building their own home; an independent Black farmer, builder and contractor; a Black businessman and banker; scenes inside a modern African-American home, church and school; and finally, a college commencement. For her work on the tableaux, Warrick was awarded a gold medal by the directors of the exposition.

=== Ethiopia and beyond ===
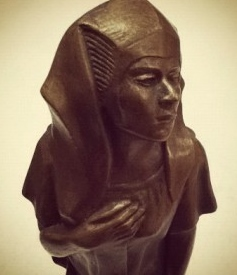
Meta Vaux Warrick Fuller, Ethiopia, bronze sculpture, 1910

Fuller exhibited at the Pennsylvania Academy of the Fine Arts in 1920. She created one of her most famous works, Ethiopia (also known as Ethiopia Awakening), for America's Making Exhibition in 1921. This event was meant to highlight immigrants' contributions to US artistic society and culture. This sculpture was featured in the exhibition's "colored section," and it symbolized a new Black identity that was emerging through the Harlem Renaissance. It represented the pride of African Americans in African and Black heritage and identity. Ethiopia, drawn from Egyptian sculptural concepts, is an academic sculpture of an African woman emerging from a mummy's wrappings, like a chrysalis from a cocoon, represented her statement on Black consciousness globally. Fuller made multiple versions of Ethiopia, including a small maquette with the figure's left hand projecting from its body (now lost) and two full-size bronze casts, one with the left hand projecting and a second made incorrectly, with the left hand flush to the figure's side.

In 1922, Fuller showed her sculpture work at the Boston Public Library. Her work was included in an exhibition for the Tanner League, held in the studios of Dunbar High School in Washington, D.C. The federal commissions kept her employed, but she did not receive as much encouragement in the US as she had in Paris. Fuller continued to exhibit her work until her last show at Howard University (Washington, D.C.) in 1961.

== Poetry ==
Her poem "Departure" was included in the 1991 collection Now is Your Time! The African-American Struggle for Freedom.

The time is near (reluctance laid aside)
I see the barque afloat upon the ebbing tide
While on the shores my friends and loved ones stand.
I wave to them a cheerful parting hand,
Then take my place with Charon at the helm,
And turn and wave again to them.
Oh, may the voyage not be arduous nor long,
But echoing with chant and joyful song,
May I behold with reverence and grace,
The wondrous vision of the Master's face.

== Theater ==
Warrick Fuller made significant contributions to theater. She was a multi-faceted designer, director, and actress. One of her focuses was stage lighting, which was not considered a true art form until the late 1920s; moreover, lighting design was dominated by men. Fuller was able to design for both African-American and white theater companies, which was unheard of at the time. In 1918, she joined theater organizations in Boston, Massachusetts. She was known for her paintings of "living pictures" as well as the creation of props, scenery, and masks. The Answer was an African-American stage production where Fuller designed costumes while also performing a small role. She became active in the Civic League Players (CLS) in the late 1920s and was the only African American in the organization. With the CLS, Fuller worked on over thirty shows in all different areas of production and taught workshops. In 1928, she was taking theater classes at Wellesley College and Columbia University that focused on pageantry, lighting, and playwriting. After becoming less active in the CLS, Fuller joined a Black theater company called the Allied Arts Theatre Group (AATG) where she worked as a head designer, director, and board member. She was involved with the AATG until the founder's death in 1936. Even with her commitments of being an artist and working in theater, Fuller wrote at least six plays under the pseudonym, Danny Deaver. The following is an excerpt of stage directions in her production titled, A Call After Midnight:

"On the long hall table is a lamp, which the characters snap on and off, as they stop to look for mail, which is left in a receptacle for that purpose. The wall lights of the room are controlled by a switch at right of entrance, but these are of dull amber, the candle variety, the light is never bright."

== Personal life ==
In 1907, Warrick married Dr. Solomon Carter Fuller, a prominent physician and psychiatrist, known for his work with Alzheimer's disease. Born in Liberia, Fuller was one of the first Black psychiatrists in the United States. The couple settled on Warren Road in Framingham, Massachusetts, one of the first Black families to join the community. She continued to create works of art, against the stigma that she should settle down and become a housewife once she and her husband had three children. Their son Perry became a sculptor as well. Prominent African-Americans visited their house, as did the Prince of Siam. Within the community, Warrick Fuller helped establish and was involved in the lighting of productions presented by the Framingham Dramatic Society. She was an active member of St. Andrew's Episcopal Church where she directed and costumed plays and pageants.

After the fire in 1910, Warrick Fuller built a studio in the back of her house, something which her husband strongly opposed. She found herself inspired by her religion and began to sculpt traditional biblical scenes. Warrick believed making art was her divine calling so her being cast out didn't discourage her reignited motivation to create.

== Death ==
Warrick Fuller died at Cardinal Cushing Hospital in Framingham, Massachusetts, on March 13, 1968,

== Legacy ==
Despite being faced with sexism and racism, Meta’s genius shone throughout her life and work as she carried herself with pride and dignity that is evident in her timeless pieces of art which are now displayed in various places around the U.S.

— Framingham History Center

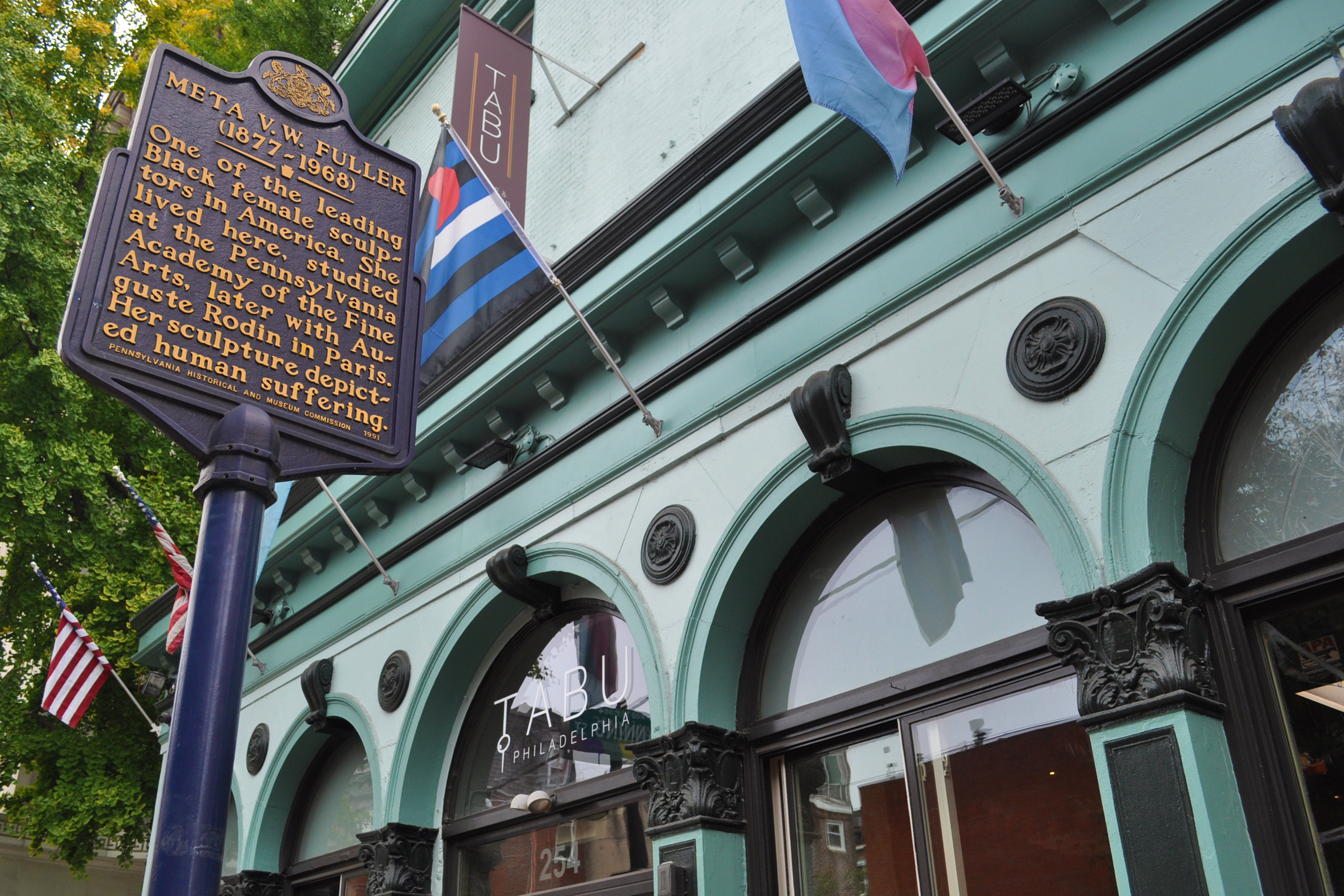
Meta V.W. Fuller (1877–1968). One of the leading Black female sculptors in America. She lived here, studied at the Pennsylvania Academy of the Fine Arts, later with Auguste Rodin in Paris. Her sculpture depicted human suffering. (Historical Marker at 254 S. 12th St. Philadelphia PA - Pennsylvania Historical and Museum Commission 1991)

Warrick Fuller's work received renewed interest beginning in the late 20th century. Her work was featured in 1988 in a traveling exhibition at the Crocker Art Museum, along with artists Aaron Douglas, Palmer C. Hayden and James Van Der Zee. Her work was also featured in a traveling exhibition called Three Generations of African American Women Sculptors: A Study in Paradox, in Georgia in 1998.

The Danforth Museum has a large collection of Fuller's sculptures, including many unfinished works from her home studio. Many were exhibited in a solo retrospective show of her work there from November 2008 to May 2009.

Fuller's work was included in the 2015 exhibition We Speak: Black Artists in Philadelphia, 1920s-1970s at the Woodmere Art Museum.

== Works ==
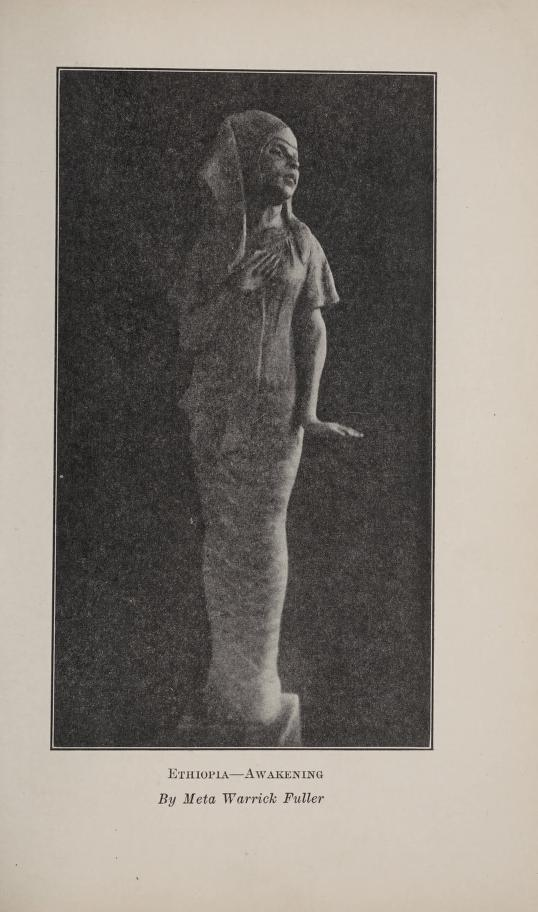
Meta Vaux Warrick Fuller, Ethiopia Awakening, c. 1921, small maquette (location unknown), reproduced in Robert T. Kerlin, Negro Poets and their Poems (Washington, DC: Associated Publishers, Inc., 1923), 45.

- Bacchante, painted plaster sculpture, 1930
- Emancipation, in plaster, 1913; in bronze, 1999. Featured on the Boston Women's Heritage Trail.
- Ethiopia, small maquette cast in plaster and painted to resemble bronze, c. 1921, 13 × 3 1/2 × 3 7/8 in., National Museum of African American History and Culture.
- Ethiopia Awakening, bronze sculpture, greenish-black patina, with hand incorrectly placed flush with the figure's side, c. 1921, 67 x 16 x 20 in., Schomburg Center for Research in Black Culture, New York Public Library.
- Henry Gilbert, painted plaster sculpture, 1928
- Jason, painted plaster sculpture, Danfort Museum
- La petite danseuse, bronze sculpture, Los Angeles County Museum of Art
- Les Miserables, bronze sculpture, Maryhill Museum of Art, Goldendale, Washington
- Lazy Bones in the Shade, sculpture, c. 1937
- Man Eating Out His Heart, painted plaster sculpture, 1905–1906. It represents a kneeling male nude eating his heart.
- Mary Turner (A Silent Protest Against Mob Violence), painted plaster sculpture, 1919, Museum of Afro-American History, Boston, Massachusetts
- Mother and Child, cast bronze sculpture, 1962, Massachusetts Institute of Technology
- Peace Halting the Ruthlessness of War, c.1917, renamed and unveiled as "Ravages of War" on October 15, 1999, at West Virginia State College
- Phyllis Wheatley (c. 1753-1784), painted plaster sculpture, c. 1925. It was made based upon an engraving published in 1773
- Refugee, sculpture, c. 1940. Hunched male figure with a cane in his hand
- Talking Skull, bronze sculpture, 1937, Museum of Afro-American History, Boston, Massachusetts. Kneeling male figure facing a skull
- The Good Shepherd, painted plaster sculpture, c. 1926–1927
- Waterboy, sculpture, 1930

== See also ==
- Lois Mailou Jones
- Sargent Claude Johnson
- Jacob Lawrence
- Archibald Motley
- Romare Bearden

== Bibliography ==
- Ater, Renée. Remaking Race and History: The Sculpture of Meta Warrick Fuller. Berkeley: University of California Press. 2011. ISBN 9780520262126 OCLC 775736931
- Beach, Caitlin (2015). "Meta Warrick Fuller's Mary Turner: and the Memory of Mob Violence". Nka: Journal of Contemporary African Art. 36 (1): 16–27. doi:10.1215/10757163-2914284. S2CID 192667152. Project MUSE 583920.
- Brundage, W. Fitzhugh (2003). "Meta Warrick's 1907 'Negro Tableaux' and (Re)Presenting African American Historical Memory". The Journal of American History. 89 (4): 1368–1400. doi:10.2307/3092547. JSTOR 3092547. ProQuest 224897722.
- Driskell, David C. et al. Harlem Renaissance: Art of Black America, New York, 1994. ISBN 0810910993
- Igoe, Lynn Moody with James Igoe, 250 years of Afro-American Art: An Annotated Bibliography. New York: Bowker, 1981. OCLC 760970440
- An Independent Woman: The Life and Art of Meta Warrick Fuller (1877-1968). Framingham, MA: Danforth Museum of Art. 1984. Exhibition catalogue. OCLC 17576775
- Kerr, N. God-Given Work: The Life and Times of Sculptor Meta Vaux Warrick Fuller, 1877-1968, Amherst, 1987.
- King-Hammond, L. et al. 3 Generations of African American Women Sculptors: A Study in Paradox, Philadelphia, 1996.
- Perkins, Kathy A. (1990). "The Genius of Meta Warrick Fuller". Black American Literature Forum. 24 (1): 65–72. doi:10.2307/2904066. JSTOR 2904066.
- Powell, Richard J. and David A. Bailey. Rhapsodies in Black: Art of the Harlem Renaissance, 1997.
- Schneider, Erika. (2022). “Asserting Agency: Meta Vaux Warrick Fuller’s Scrapbook,” Panorama: Journal of the Association of Historians of American Art. https://doi.org/10.24926/24716839.15090
