= La Alianza Hispana =

La Alianza Hispana is a social service agency founded in 1969 by residents of Roxbury/ North Dorchester to support Boston's Hispanic population. La Alianza advocates for equal access to services and public resources for the Hispanic Community by combating the effects of discrimination, poverty and challenges of migration.

== History ==
The organization was founded in 1968 by Ana Maria Rodriguez, teacher of English as a Second Language at an elementary school. La Alianza Hispana began as five temporary bilingual classes teaching English as a Second Language for Roxbury and Dorchester’s Latino Spanish-speaking population. Its first location was at 665 Dudley St, in Dorchester as a “Planning and Family Service Center in March 1969. In September 1970, La Alianza Hispana was incorporated by the Roxbury Multiservice Center after gaining its support for a separate Latino-specific organization and from there began work beyond bilingual classes and expanded to address needs like housing, job training, youth programs, education, and poverty. Later that year, it received $33,000 from Boston's Model Cities Program. The Model Cities Program became involved with La Alianza because they wanted to initiate a recreational program for teenagers in the area, which ended up becoming the Denison House. Since its founding, its main goals have been to support the needs of low-income Spanish speaking immigrants —mainly those that live in the Roxbury and Dorchester neighborhoods of Boston. In 1975 La Alianza became a United Way affiliate to diversify funding. From 1981 to 1985 Nelson Merced was the executive director of La Alianza, improving the organization's financial standing.

== Objectives ==
La Alianza Hispana has a Model of Intervention. They identify threats made to families and children and help rehabilitate the family unit as a whole. La Alianza manages multiple program areas, serving thousands each year. It has also developed a financial and budget management system in order to keep track of each program's record of financial activity by conducting monthly computer program based financial reports. Through the Finance Committee, the Agency's Board of Directors creates policies and supervises staff operations. The organization has collaborative agreements with other institutions such as Roxbury Community College, Project AFRIC and the University of Massachusetts. Although these partnerships have influenced and helped disadvantaged and homeless women, none of these address the importance of literacy training to clients. So the adult illiteracy education program through La Alianza Hispana fills a significant gap in services.In 1983, La Alianza partnered with the Nuestra and Bohio Development Corporation to create a family housing project in Roxbury.

== Programs ==
One of the first programs developed by La Alianza Hispana was with Model Cities. They created a Small Business Development Project to help Latino businessmen in the Boston area. La Alianza Hispana offers a multitude of programs and services to the local community and its residents. These programs and services are divided by similar themes and those themes are grouped by units that provide similar services like health care or family services. Because of this, La Alianza Hispana is decentralized in structure and has many units providing many services for local residents. They include:

English as a Second Language instruction became formally housed under the Education Department that was established in 1972. The Education Department also offered General Education Development test preparation courses for adults in Spanish, the first organization in Boston to do so.

Youth Development Unit was established in 1978 with the aim of expanding and focusing on youth programs. Programs have included children's services, recreation, tutoring, and involving Spanish-speaking youth in educating their friends about substance abuse and prevention. The Youth Development unit also helped organize efforts to desegregate Boston’s public schools in the 1970s.

The Public Health Unit was established in 1990 to focus on HIV/AIDS education and other health awareness programs.

The Latino Family Counseling Center, established in 1997 offers group and family counseling as well as behavioral health services to Latino communities. Specifically, the Family Counseling Center provides services for mental health issues, sexual assault support, family reunification services, and support groups for LGBT youth and their families.

The Elderly Services Program provides service to Latino elders age 60 and up. In 1997, the Adult Day Care Center opened in Roxbury to provide seniors a space to socialize. Building on this, the Center opened a second location at Parker Hill Avenue in Mission Hill in 2006. At the new location, Latino seniors have access to Latino food, can participate in activities like musical performances, and can receive health care services.

The Dudley Street Neighborhood Initiative which is a program like the Alianza Hispana but more specific to the community in Dudley Street, now renamed Nubian Square.

Nuestra Comunidad Development Corporation. This program helps with community and economic development within the Hispanic community in Boston.

Casa Esperanza is a drug treatment facility helping those dealing with substance abuse.

Casa Primavera is a psycho-social transitional rehabilitation facility helping and counseling Hispanics in Boston with disabilities how to optimize their life.

== Funding Resources ==
La Alianza has tripled its operational budget since its founding. Currently, about 5,000 clients are seen per year. The majority of the programs do not charge any fee for the services provided due to clients who suffer from extreme poverty. However, there are a combination of sources that fund La Alianza Hispana's programs.

For example, the Department for Social Services and the Department of Public Health provide funding for the Youth Center Unit. Besides public sources, the Alianza is also funded by private sources. United Way of America is a non-profit organization that works throughout the country in partnership with charitable organizations in an effort to increase fundraising and support, provides 18% of their current funding while others provide 6-7% of the current operating costs.

== Today’s Work ==
On May 20, 2017, La Alianza Hispana opened a new location on Massachusetts Avenue near Boston Medical Center. Its current director is Marisol Amaya-Aluigi. They have expanded their services to more neighborhoods in the city of Boston like Dorchester, Roxbury, Jamaica Plain, Hyde Park, Roslindale, West Roxbury, Mattapan, East Boston. As well as neighboring Boston cities like Chelsea and Lawrence.

La Alianza Hispana has developed many programs along the way. Up to date these services include:

Adult Day Time Program. Helps disabled adults with social stressors, dealing with cognitive impairment, and fitness classes based on their physical health.

Familias Saludables (Healthy Families) Helps promote parental education, proper nutrition for school for children, and physical activities for the family as a unit.

Social and Recreational Programs. Care, activities, social events, and resources for elders who are at a disadvantage. This helps promote independence, health and access to services.

Well Being Program. Teaches adults habits and prevention methods for chronic illnesses.

In 2019, along with two other non-profit organizations, La Alianza Hispana was awarded $100,000 in grants for digital literacy education from the city of Boston’s Department of Innovation and Technology’s Digital Equity Fund.
