= Dorothy Robinson Homer =

American librarian (1897–1978)

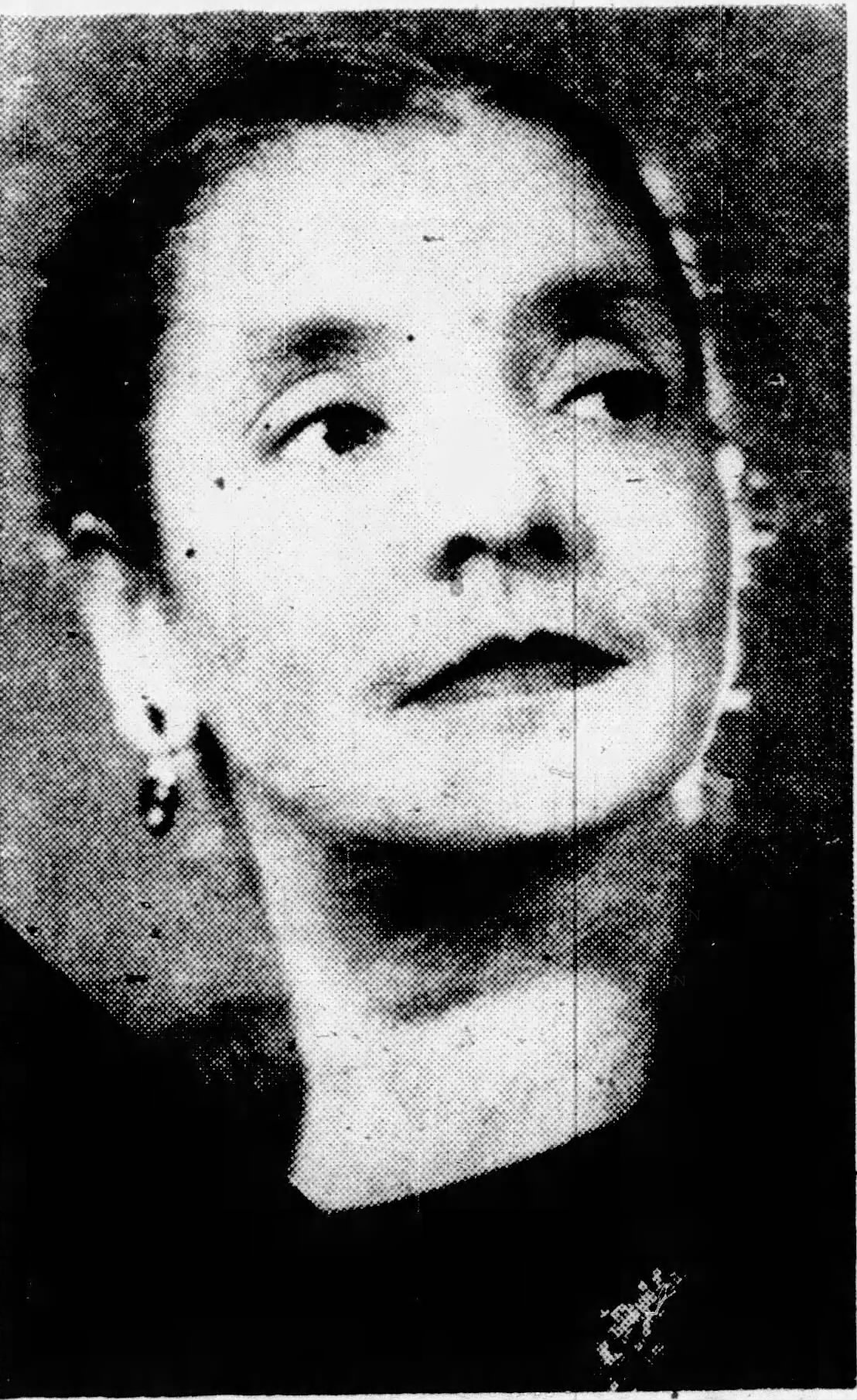
- Homer c. 1954
- Born: 1897; Washington, D.C., US
- Died: January 10, 1978 (aged 80–81); Washington, D.C., US
- Education: Howard University; Columbia University School of Library Service

Dorothy Robinson Homer (1897 – January 10, 1978) was an American librarian who served as Branch Librarian and later Branch Supervising Librarian at the New York Public Library's 135th Street Branch (later the Countee Cullen Branch) in Harlem starting in 1942. She was the first African American to lead the 135th branch and one of three African Americans who headed a neighborhood branch of NYPL before 1950. She succeeded Ernestine Rose in 1942, making significant contributions to the library's role as a cultural center for African American studies and history during World War II and through the Civil Rights Movement.

== Early life ==
Dorothy Robinson was born in 1897 in Washington, D.C., and was one of eight children. She graduated from Howard University, where she served as class critic, with the Class of 1919. She later graduated from the Columbia University School of Library Service. From 1929 to 1930, she served as president of the Washington, D.C. Alumnae Chapter of Delta Sigma Theta sorority

== Career at the New York Public Library ==
In June 1942, Homer was appointed Branch Librarian of the 135th Street Branch, succeeding Ernestine Rose. The Citizens' Committee of the 135th Street Branch Library had specifically requested that an African-American librarian succeed Rose, and Homer's appointment marked a milestone as the first African American to lead the branch. At the time, the library housed approximately 40,000 books and had recently undergone an expansion with a new extension being added to the library.

In 1942 radio talk, Homer articulated her vision for the library, stating that the new building was "dedicated to the principles of Democracy which cherish books while Dictatorships burn them; it is dedicated to give the best book service to all the community, and to hold out to those in search of it the broader and deeper meaning of Negro history."

=== Programs and initiatives ===
Homer advanced to the position of Branch Supervising Librarian at the Countee Cullen Branch and implemented several programs that strengthened the library's cultural role. She established a dedicated youth room and, following the outbreak of World War II, Homer initiated a program of monthly concert recitals in the library's auditorium to enhance public morale and community spirit. The popularity of these performances led to the program becoming a permanent fixture of the library. One of Homer's most notable contributions was facilitating the creation of the American Negro Theatre in the library's basement. Inspired by the four principles of Black drama outlined by W. E. B. Du Bois (that it should be by, about, for, and near Black people), the theater served as a training ground for Black actors and playwrights. This theater became an important cultural institution in Harlem and produced the play Anna Lucasta, which achieved success and went to Broadway. Anna Lucasta opened on Broadway in 1944 and ran for 957 performances over nearly three years, becoming one of the first plays with an all-Black cast to achieve mainstream commercial success on Broadway.

Around the time of Homer's appointment in 1942, the Schomburg Collection of Negro History and Literature (renamed in 1940) had outgrown the 135th street building and moved to a new building on 136th Street, which became the branch now known as Countee Cullen Library. Homer was described as being an active member of the Association for the Study of Negro Life and History. Homer contributed to bibliographic scholarship on Black literature and history. She compiled The Negro; a list of significant books for the New York Public Library, which went through at least eight editions by 1960. She maintained the library's emphasis on serving as a community center for art, music, and drama, building upon the legacy established during the Harlem Renaissance. Under Homer's leadership, the library staff started initiatives addressing community needs, including an African American Folk Art program and an anti-poverty program.

Homer retired around 1964 and was honored at a farewell celebration at the Countee Cullen Branch Library. In 1965, she received an award for outstanding service along with Ossie Davis, Ruby Dee, John W. Davis, and Jeanne L. Noble.

== Personal life ==
Homer married Theodore H. Homer, a pharmacist, and had at least one son. She died on January 10, 1978, in Washington, D.C.
