= Catherine Allen Latimer =

American librarian

- Latimer in 1938
- Born: Catherine Bosley Allen; 1896; Nashville, Tennessee
- Died: 1948 (aged 51–52); Brooklyn, New York
- Education: Howard University
- Occupation: Librarian
- Known for: First African-American Librarian at the New York Public Library
- Spouse: Benton R. Latimer (m. 1921)
- Mother: Minta Bosley Allen Trotman

Catherine Allen Latimer (1896 – 1948) was the New York Public Library's first African-American librarian. She was a notable authority on bibliographies of African-American life and instrumental in forming the library's Division of Negro History, Literature and Prints.

== Personal life ==
Catherine Bosley Allen was born in Nashville, TN, in 1896 to suffragist Minta Bosley and H. W. Allen. Her early years were spent in France and Germany, where she became fluent in French and gained the ability to read German. When she was a child her family moved to Brooklyn, NY, and she continued to live in New York for most of her adult life.

She graduated from Brooklyn's Girls High School in 1916 and went on to study librarianship at Howard University, joining the Alpha Kappa Alpha Sorority there, and Columbia University's library school.

In 1921, she married Benton R. Latimer, who worked as an accountant for the United States Post Office.

== Librarianship ==
Latimer worked as a library assistant for a year (1919–1920) at Tuskegee Institute's library and then returned to Brooklyn.

When the New York Public Library (NYPL) hired her in 1920 as a substitute librarian, she became the library's first African-American librarian. Her hiring came as a result of the local Urban League highlighting the need of a Black library staff to Ernestine Rose(135th Street branch's head librarian), a need that has arisen due to the formerly Jewish neighborhood now becoming predominantly Black, to which Rose agreed. She transitioned to being a full-time librarian at the end of 1920 and remained at the 135th Street branch–termed "Harlem's cultural center"—for the entirety of her 26-year-long career.

Latimer is known for having established and maintained a clippings file to document Black history and in 1924, Latimer and Ernestine Rose started a drive to build a collection of reference books about Black history. As the books became damaged with frequent use, Latimer and Rose decided to move the collection to the library's fourth floor. A year later, the growing collection—supported by community leaders such as historian Arturo Alfonso Schomburg and activists James Weldon Johnson and Hubert Harrison—became the Division of Negro History, Literature and Prints. As Latimer expresses in her 1934 writing Where Can I Get Material On the Negro?, the objective of this division was to provide the growing Black population of Harlem, and others, with material on Black people. Through the preservation of historical material on Black people, "race consciousness and race pride are being aroused and inspired . . . it is hoped in the future that these treasures may be more widely used and appreciated by all races." Latimer was named as head of the division, and got promoted to Grade 3 (denoting her as a senior professional in the NYPL), a year later.

=== The Schomburg Years ===
In 1926, NYPL acquired Schomburg's own collection of printed matter, which Latimer worked on integrating into the division. She was not an expert in rare books, however, and a few years later NYPL hired Schomburg himself as curator of the Schomburg Collection, with Latimer serving as his assistant. Many authors give credit and thanks to the librarians Rose and Latimer for their work in the creation and maintenance of this division. Latimer worked at the 135th Street library for 26 years and worked to promote the collection. She provided lectures for students attending Columbia, Vassar, Smith, Hunter and Pratt Institute. She also organized numerous public programs and exhibits that helped connect the public to topics covered in the collection. In 1934 she published "Where Can I Get Material on the Negro" in The Crisis. Following Arturo Schomburg's death, Latimer again resumed overseeing the collection until Dr. Lawrence D. Reddick was named curator in 1939.

=== Later Years, and Impact ===
Latimer, working alongside Schomburg to provide user services, wanted patrons to learn how to use the card catalog and fill out library request slips themselves. The library was frequented by many artists, thinkers and writers during the Harlem Renaissance and Latimer often assisted them with research during this time. When reflecting on his early days in Harlem, Langston Hughes remembers Latimer, calling her a "luscious cafe-au-lait." and Latimer was in frequent correspondence W. E. B Du Bois. Du Bois advocated for Latimer and Regina Anderson Andrews, calling on administrators at the New York Public Library to stop discriminatory hiring and promotion practices and to retain and promote Black librarians. Latimer collaborated with Dorothy Porter to create new vocabularies to describe their collections since terms they needed were often missing in the authorized Library of Congress Subject headings and worked to reorganize books on the shelf since the Dewey Decimal System made it difficult to find works related to Black culture. She moved books on Africa that had been shelved in the travel section to the ethnology and history sections and assigned new call numbers to books that had been shelved under slavery to sections covering race relations and economic history.

== Retirement and death ==
Due to ill health and poor eyesight, Latimer retired in 1946. She died in 1948 at Kings County Hospital after an 8-month illness leaving her husband, son Bosley, mother and brother Henry B. Allen behind. Several hundred people attended her funeral at the Arthur Q. Martin-Arthur Funeral Home in Brooklyn.
