= Wendell L. Wray =

Librarian and educator

- Born: January 30, 1926; Pittsburgh, Pennsylvania, US
- Died: August 24, 2003 (aged 77); San Francisco, California, US
- Education: Bates College; Carnegie Institute of Technology
- Occupations: Librarian, educator

Wendell L. Wray (January 30, 1926 – August 24, 2003) was an American librarian and educator who was dedicated to preserving African-American history through oral history. He was a professor at the University of Pittsburgh from 1973 to 1988, with a break from 1981 to 1983 while he served as the director of the Schomburg Center for Research in Black Culture.

== Early life and education ==
Wendell Leonard Wray was born in Pittsburgh, Pennsylvania, on January 30, 1926. He grew up in the Beltzhoover neighborhood of Pittsburgh and attended South Hills High School. He served in the U.S. Army and received an honorable discharge in 1946. Receiving a scholarship under the G.I. Bill, he attended Bates College in Lewiston, Maine. At Bates he was the poet laureate of his class; he graduated with a Bachelor's degree in psychology in 1950.

He returned to Pittsburgh to attend the Carnegie Institute of Technology and became the first African-American man to graduate from that library school, earning his Master of Library Science in 1952.

== Work in libraries and education ==
Wray was the first African-American man to be hired by the Carnegie Library of Pittsburgh, where he worked for seven years, first in Adult Circulation and later in Public Affairs.

In 1959 he moved to New York City. Wray worked for fourteen years at branch libraries of the New York Public Library. He directed the NYPL North Manhattan Library Project when it began in 1965 until 1973; the program provided financial support for additional staff and programming to better serve disadvantaged communities.

Alex Haley, author of Roots, encouraged and financially supported Wray to study at the Columbia University's new oral history course in the summer of 1973.

In 1973 Wray became a professor at the University of Pittsburgh School of Library and Information Science. That same year he received the school's Distinguished Alumnus Award. Wray taught courses on library and information science basics like reference and collection development, as well as more specific areas like library services to the underserved, African-American bibliography, and oral history. He retired from the University of Pittsburgh in 1988.

== Work at the Schomburg Center ==
From 1964 to 1965, Wray was the acting director of the Schomburg Center for Research in Black Culture during chief Jean Blackwell Hutson's leave of absence. In that role, he planned the Schomburg archival conservation and restoration program and worked to establish an oral history program within the research center.

In 1981 Wray was named chief of the Schomburg Center. During his time as director of the Schomburg, the research center began displaying exhibits in a new gallery space and started The Schomburg Collection of Black Children's Literature and Materials. Wray was criticized for hiring Robert C. Morris to be the head of the Center's rare books, manuscripts and archives; activists protested the hiring of a white man to be the head archivist. He resigned in March 1983.

== Later life and death ==
After retirement, he moved to Oakland, California, where he was an active member of two Episcopal parishes. He lived in Oakland until his death on August 24, 2003, in San Francisco.
