= J. A. Palmer =

J. A. Palmer may refer to:

People

- James A. Palmer, the photographer who signed his work J. A. Palmer

Ship

- USS J. A. Palmer (SP-319)
