= Melva L. Price =

American educator

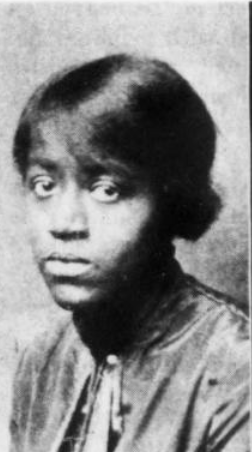
- Melva L. Price, from a 1926 publication
- Born: Melva Lorinda Price; November 14, 1902; North Carolina, US
- Died: April 10, 1996 (aged 93); New York, US
- Occupations: Educator, activist

Melva Lorinda Price (November 14, 1902 – April 10, 1996) was an American educator and activist based in New York City. She taught Latin and other subjects for over thirty years in the New York public schools, and was active in Harlem with the YWCA, Alpha Kappa Alpha, the Hunter College Alumni Club, and other organizations.

== Early life ==
Melva Lorinda Price was born in North Carolina, the daughter of William J. Price and Josie (or Jessie) A. Price. The family moved to New York City when Melva Price was a little child, part of the Great Migration. At age 13, she made national news for her academic achievements in a racially-integrated and co-educational school. She graduated from Bushwick High School in Brooklyn in 1920, and graduated from Hunter College in 1924. She was elected to Phi Beta Kappa, won the Classics gold medal for excellence in Latin and Greek, and was an active member of Alpha Kappa Alpha.

== Career ==
Price taught Latin and other subjects in the New York Public Schools from 1924 to 1960, including stints at P.S. 157, James Madison, Wadleigh, Theodore Roosevelt, Morris and New Dorp high schools. In 1943, she worked with Max Yergan and Canada Lee to establish the Harlem People's School, an institute for adult education and community programs. Margaret Morgan Lawrence recalled Price as one of her mentors in Harlem, and Price tutored Philippa Schuyler in Latin, Spanish and French.

Away from the classroom, Price was close to many civil rights activists and other noted figures of the Harlem Renaissance. She worked with Thyra J. Edwards on the Negro People's Committee to Aid Spanish Refugees, and visited Edwards in Mexico City. She was president of the Residential Council of the Emma Ransom House at the YWCA in the 1920s. In 1937, she volunteered with an outreach team of black health and social workers in the Mississippi Delta. In 1942, she served on the Harlem Interracial Platform Committee with Adam Clayton Powell Sr., Myra Adele Logan, Lester Granger, and others. In 1943, she was one of the charter members of the Hunter College Alumni Club.

== Publications ==
- "The New York State Colonization Society" (1941)

== Personal life ==
Price lived with fellow teacher Ruth Martin in 1940. Price died in 1996, aged 93 years, in New York. The Melva L. Price Papers are held in the Schomburg Center for Research in Black Culture, New York Public Library.
