= James A. Palmer =

Irish-American photographer

James A. Palmer, who signed his work J. A. Palmer (c. 1825–June 1896), was an Irish-American photographer who produced thousands of stereographs about life in Aiken, South Carolina and Georgia.

== Personal life ==
Palmer was born in Ireland and he moved with his family and settled in Rochester, New York when he was young.

Palmer and his wife, Mary E. Palmer, had two sons, Charles born in 1861 in Illinois and Thomas born October 1869 in Georgia. (Note: Teal states that son Charles was born in New York, but census records show he was born in Illinois.)

During the Civil War, he served in Company F of the 99th Illinois Volunteer Infantry Regiment and his residence was Perry, Pike County, Illinois.

== Career ==
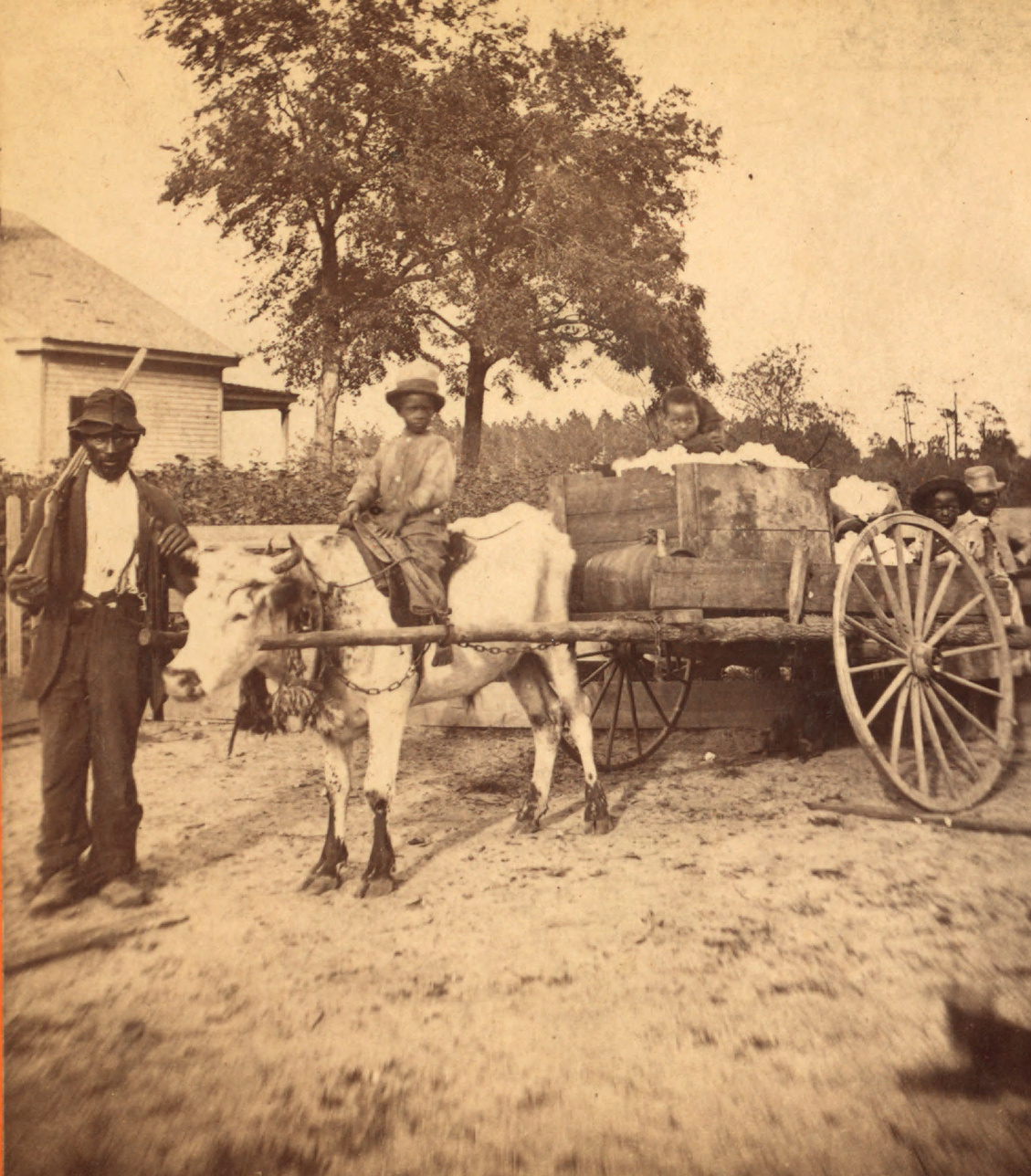
Man leading oxcart with cotton to cotton gin, one child riding ox, others in cart, circa 1870–1885, albumen print, New York Public Library

Palmer specialized in photographs of the African-American community. He took family and personal portraits as well as images of their homes and scenes from cotton fields and other locations where they worked. Palmer's stereographs of the lives of African-Americans at work provide important information about how both white South Carolinians and African-Americans adjusted to the new reality. In 1864, he advertised this collection as illustrative of "Southern plantation life" in The Philadelphia Photographer.

In 1866, Palmer moved to Savannah, Georgia, where he worked as a photographer. He moved to Aiken in 1870. He was a prolific photographer at a time when the technology was still in its infancy. Palmer's continuous documentation of the lives of African-Americans before and during the Reconstruction Era (1865–1877) placed him in a rarefied company.

At that time, African Americans who were freed from slavery due to the Emancipation Proclamation (1863) or who had been soldiers fighting for their freedom during the Civil War tried to assimilate into a society that did not welcome them. Schools and churches were established to provide a means to gain education by people of all ages and establish places of worship. During this period, citizenship of African-Americans was to be resolved, but they had the right to vote, purchase property, and gain employment.

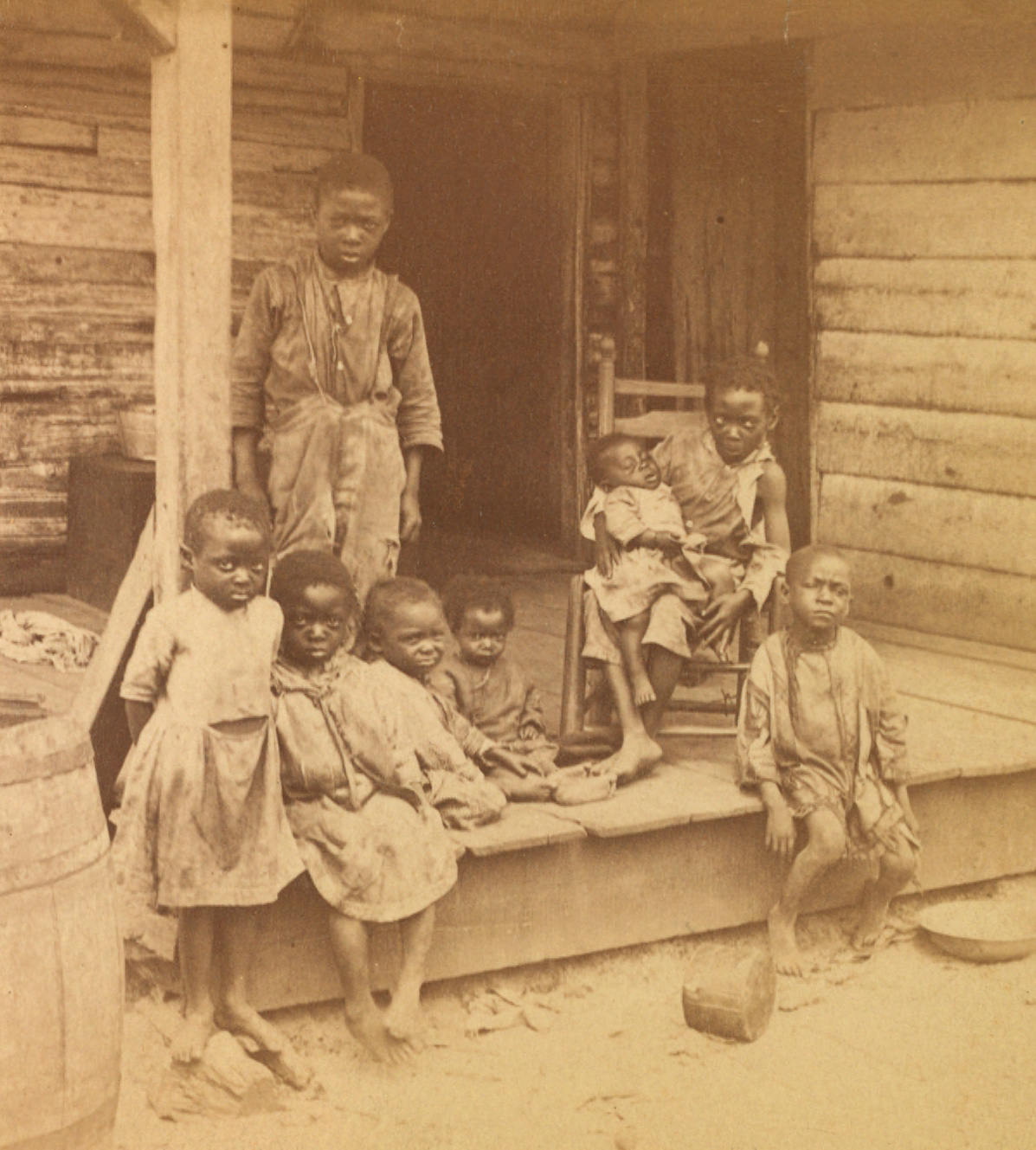
We are all, all hue, circa 1870–1885, albumen print, New York Public Library

For we colored people did not know how to be free and the white people did not know how to have a free colored person about them.

— Houston Hartsfield Holloway, a freedman

Most photographers at that time were uninterested in photographing African-Americans for a variety of financial and social reasons. Some specifically advertised their services as white only or limited the times they could be seen. Palmer's stereographs illustrated society's bias. Never once in all his stereographs do African-Americans share a physical space with white people. Some of his customers were also invariably interested in his images as way to witness people they thought to be different from them. In 1888, Ezekiel Jeremy Charles Wood, one of his customers, "bought a set to send to the Smithsonian Institute [sic]" to call attention to the "strange customs of our negro race."

His stereographs also expose his own mindset. In 1882, he produced two stereographs, one entitled "The Wilde woman of Aiken" and the other "The Aesthetic Darkey", as a response to Oscar Wilde's assertion that anything could be beautiful. Palmer apparently staged a satirical photograph based on things he found repugnant and beyond the ability to be beautiful. To him, a black woman and a young black boy as well as a number of objects embodied that trait.

While documenting scenes from black communities, Palmer mostly stayed away from any kind of political commentary. He gave his images simple and descriptive titles. However, there were also times in his career when he used his platform to champion the political rights of African-Americans, or, at the very least, to draw sympathy for them. In 1874, he took a stereograph of a poor black family he entitled "The way the negro race is dying out." He titled another image of children from the same family " We are all, all hue."

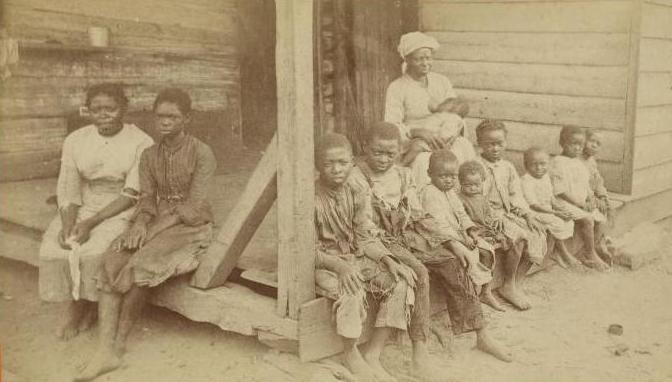
The way the Negro race is dying out. Whittaker family, 1874.

While he lived in Aiken, Palmer took advantage of its status as a winter resort and produced images of everything from the exteriors and interiors of churches to homes, public buildings, railroads and textile mills. During the 1880s, he also took pictures of Augusta, Georgia and some parts of Florida. In 1889, he contributed sixty-three photographs to illustrate Aiken, South Carolina as a Health and Pleasure Resort.

He worked as a photographer until his death in 1896.

Palmer's stereographs can be found in a number of collections, including the New York Public Library, Library of Congress, Schomburg Center for Research in Black Culture, and the International Center of Photography museum.

== Gallery ==
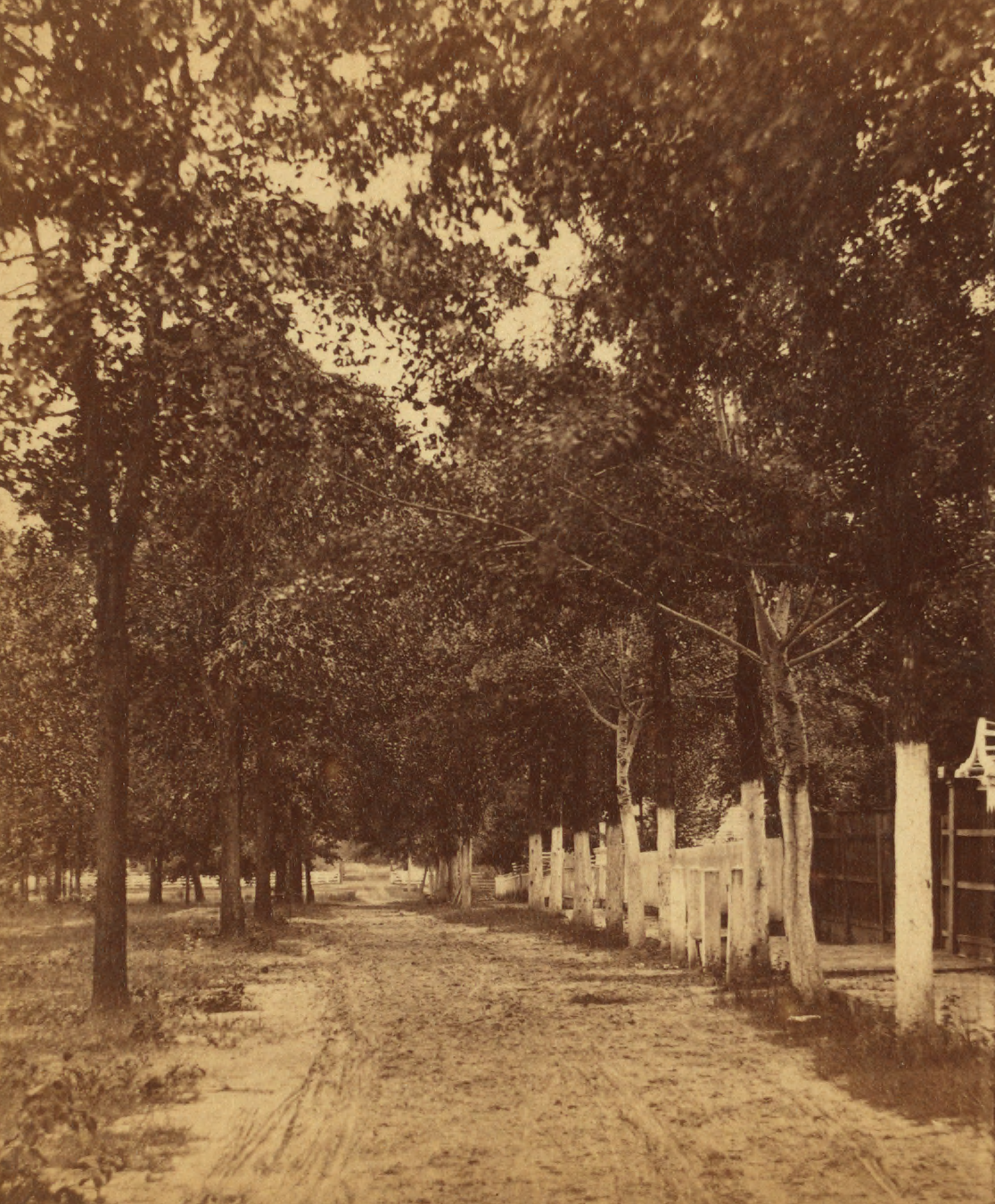
York Street, from the collection of stereoscopic views of Aiken and vicinity, New York Public Library

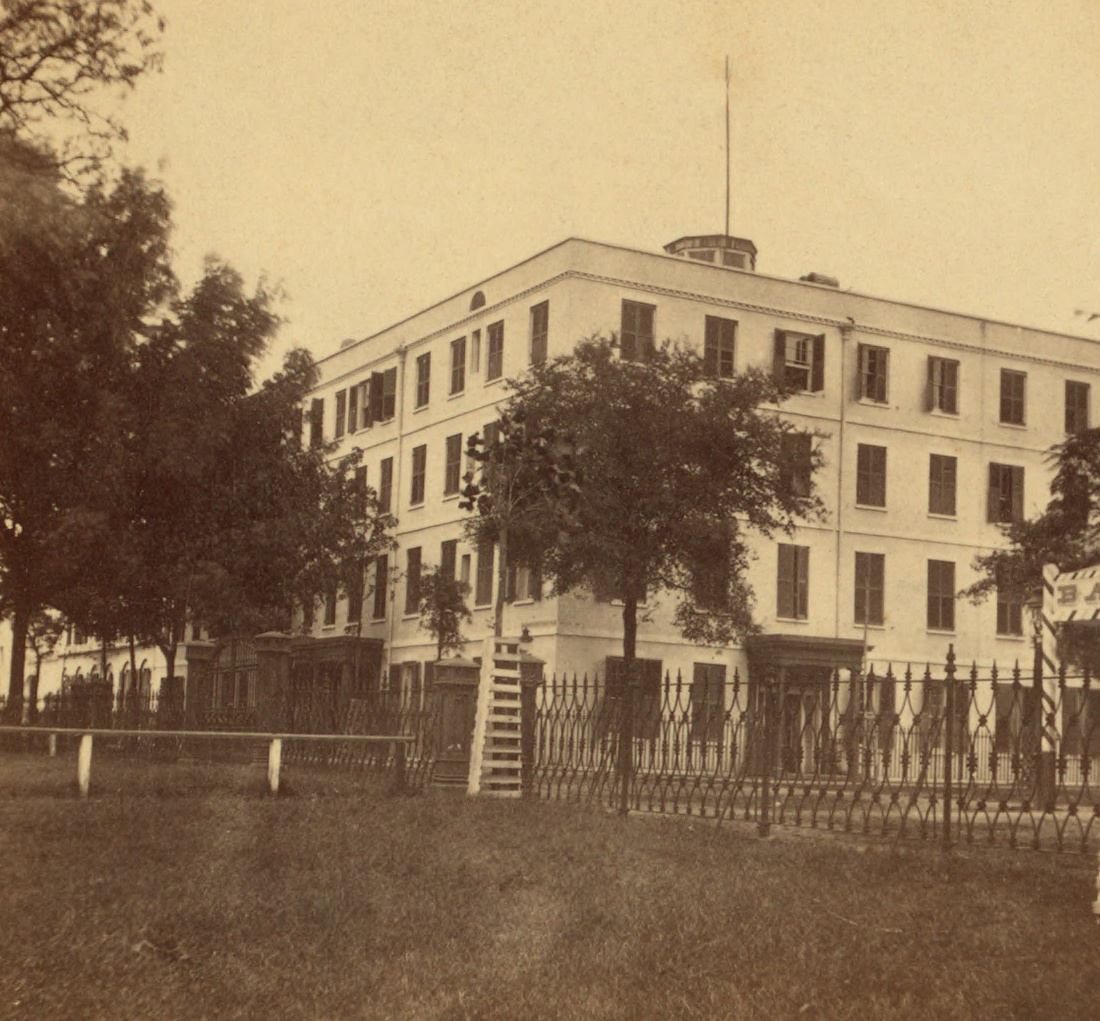
Pulaski House, New York Public Library

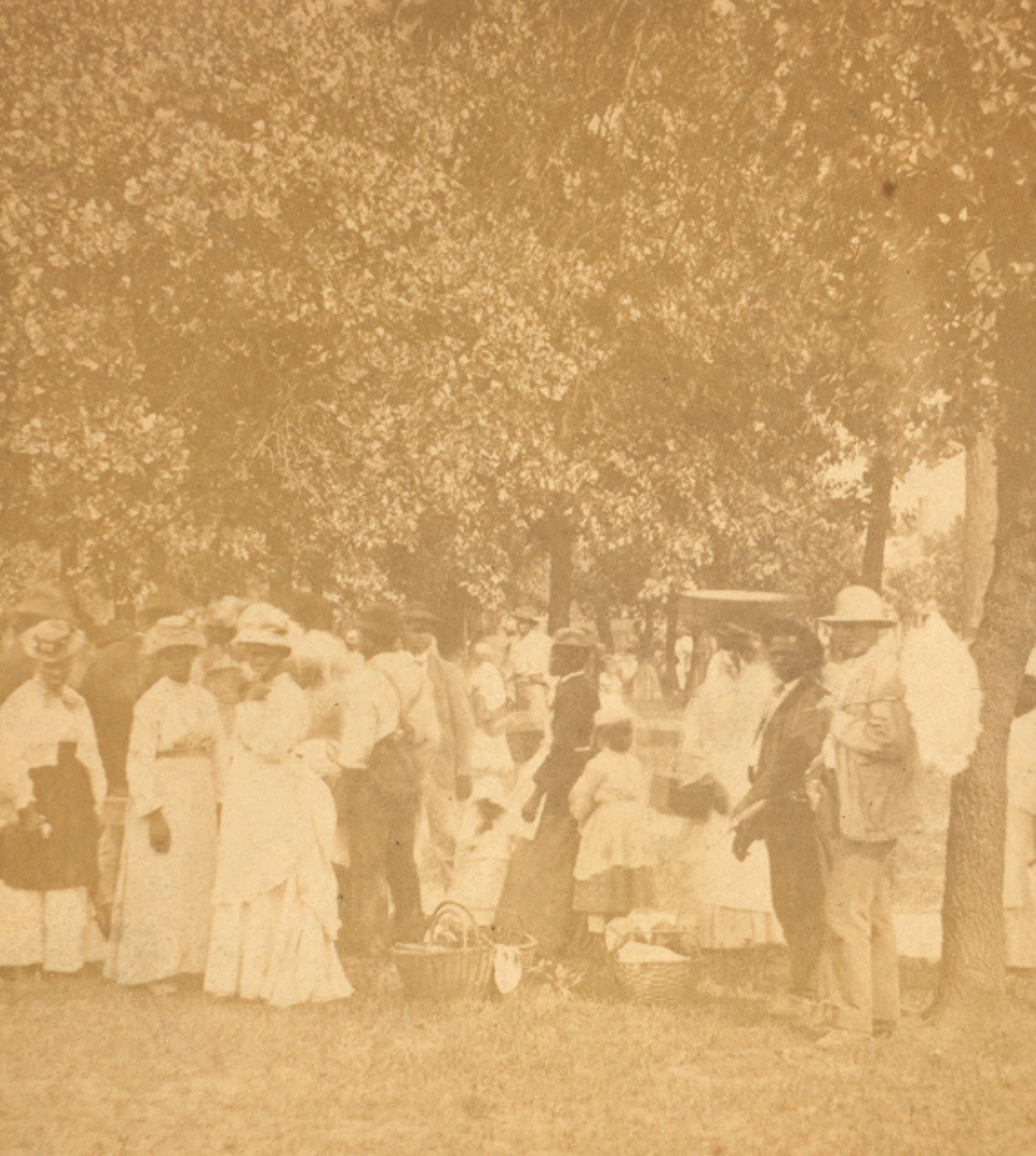
Fourth of July, 1874, New York Public Library
