= Minta Bosley Allen Trotman =

African-American suffragist

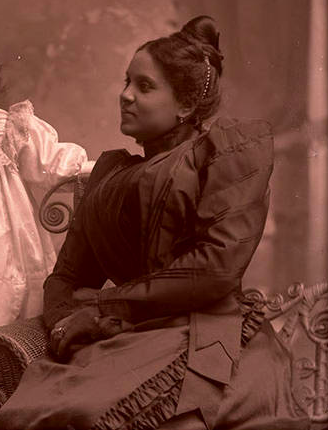
- Born: Minta Bosley; February 13, 1875; Nashville, Tennessee
- Died: May 3, 1949 (aged 74); Brooklyn, New York
- Education: Fisk University, New York School for Social Work
- Occupations: Suffragist, community leader
- Spouse(s): Henry W. Allen (1895–1903); William Frederick Trotman (1911–1949)
- Children: Catherine Allen Latimer; Marian Allen Thompson; Henry B. Allen
- Parent(s): John Beal Bosley; Catherine Harding Bosley

Minta Bosley Allen Trotman (February 13, 1875 – May 3, 1949) was an African-American suffragist and community leader, who played a prominent role in "promoting the social welfare and civic participation of black Americans" through her work in Brooklyn. Her daughter Catherine Allen Latimer was the first African-American librarian at the New York Public Library.

== Life ==
Minta Bosley was born in Nashville, Tennessee, on February 13, 1875, the only child of John Beal Bosley (a businessman) and Catherine Harding Bosley. From 1889 to 1893, she attended Fisk University, and later the New York School for Social Work.

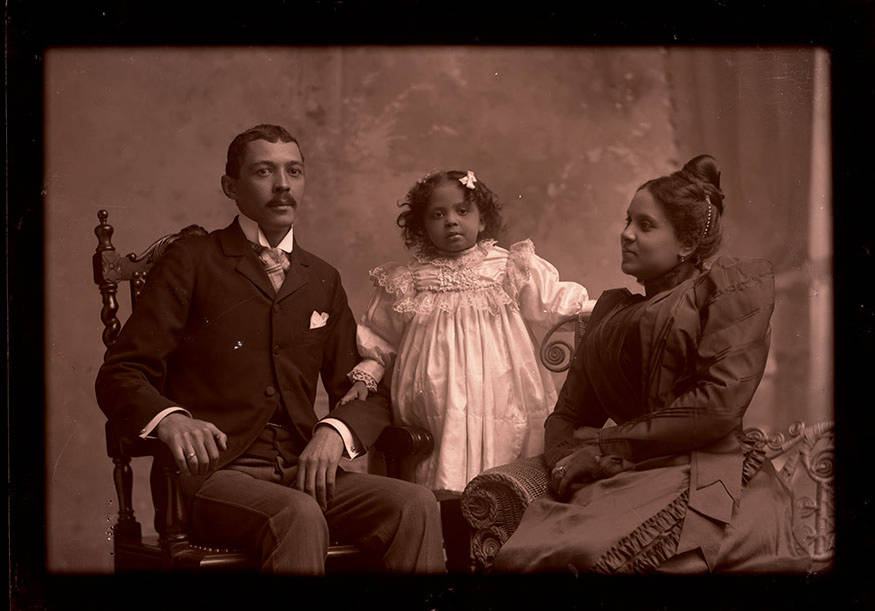
Henry W. and Minta Bosley Allen with their daughter, Catherine in 1899

In 1895, she married Henry W. Allen, a railroad mail agent, with whom she had three children: Catherine (b. 1896), Marian (b. 1899), and Henry (b. 1903). Towards the end of 1903, Henry Allen was killed in a train accident, and the widowed Minta spent time in Europe with her children, before moving to Brooklyn, New York in 1908. Time in France and Germany contributed to the children's early – and in many ways exceptional – education, with Catherine Allen noted for speaking both French and German.

In 1911, Minta married William Frederick Trotman, a prominent real estate agent who represented W. E. B. Du Bois. Minta herself became actively engaged in the community, involved in the National Association of Colored Women (NACW), the Young Women's Christian Association, and the Brooklyn Urban League. For two decades, she lectured, fundraised, led, and campaigned for a host of political and social causes. She was closely associated with, and active alongside, her friend and fellow suffragist Addie Waites Hunton, with whom she attended the national meeting of the NACW in 1912. Minta was a founding member, and the inaugural president, of the Urban League's "Big Sister Club", which focused on girls. For this, she traveled extensively throughout the country, lecturing on the organisation's behalf. When women gained the vote in 1917, she continued to work for women's increased participation in civic life as president of the Women's Civic League in Brooklyn.

In 1927, she served on the executive committee of the Women's International Circle of Peace and Foreign Relations, which was largely responsible for organising the fourth Pan-African Congress, held in New York. The committee included Hunton and Nina DuBois.

In addition to her community and activist work, Minta keenly supported the protection and promotion of African-American culture and heritage. She was actively involved in the preservation of the Frederick Douglass House, and was a collector of African folk art.

Minta Bosley Allen Trotman died on May 3, 1949, from a heart attack. She was survived by her husband, and two children (Marian and Henry). Catherine Allen Latimer had died the previous year.
