= L. S. Alexander Gumby =

American historian

- Born: Levi Sandy Alexander Gumby; February 1, 1885; Maryland
- Died: March 16, 1961 (aged 76)

Levi Sandy Alexander Gumby (February 1, 1885 – March 16, 1961) was an African-American archivist and historian. His collection of 300 scrapbooks documenting African-American history have been part of the collection of Columbia University since 1950 as the Alexander Gumby Collection of Negroiana. Gumby was also the proprietor of a popular bookstore during the Harlem Renaissance, where he was host of a salon. Gumby's passion for collecting earned him the nicknames "The Count" and "Mr. Scrapbook".

== Life ==
Born in Maryland, Gumby was the son of an evangelist, Levi Thomas Gumby, and his wife, Louisa Morris. He and his sister were sent to live with their grandparents in 1901. Gumby studied law at Dover State College in Delaware at the behest of his grandmother, but feeling his inadequacy in law he moved to New York City, which would be his home until his death. Gumby embraced life in New York, saying in his 1952 essay The Adventures of My Scrapbook that "At once I became a New Yorker in spirit and principle for I found here more freedom of action than I had ever known before". Six of his scrapbooks are autobiographical, labelled "Gumby's Autobiography".

In his early days in New York, Gumby took a number of minor jobs to support his collecting, working as a butler to a banker, a bellhop, and a postal worker during World War I. Gumby also founded the Southern Utopia Fraternity, an organization to support young men who came from the Southern States to New York in search of work and opportunities.

Gumby was forced to abandon his bookshop as a result of the Wall Street crash of 1929, and was admitted to hospital as a result of the loss of his studio and fatigue, and spent four years in hospitals on North Brother Island and Randall's Island on New York City's East River.

Working as a waiter at Columbia University, Gumby began fraternizing with academia and students. He would eventually leave his collection to Columbia, and was hired by the university to organize the collection for eight months. He added to it until his death from tuberculosis.

=== Gumby's Book Studio ===
In the 1920s Gumby received financial assistance to help compile his collection from Charles W. Newman, a wealthy stockbroker. With Newman's help Gumby moved his collection to a large studio at 2144 Fifth Avenue in Manhattan's Harlem district, that became known as "Gumby's Bookstore". His book studio became an important gathering place for the figures of the Harlem Renaissance.

The book studio served as a workspace to compile the collection as well as an exhibition space, and an artistic and intellectual salon. Due to the imperious nature with which he conducted his salon he was nicknamed "The Great God Gumby". Gumby also produced the Gumby Book Studio Quarterly, a literary journal that was only published for a single issue, and was never distributed.

Through his studio, Gumby became acquainted with such notable Harlem Renaissance figures as Countee Cullen, Claude McKay, Langston Hughes, Rose McClendon, Evelyn Ellis, Paul Robeson, Alain LeRoy Locke, Robert Schlick, Heywood Broun, H. L. Mencken, O. Richard Reid, Aaron Douglas, Dorothy West, Helene Johnson, Augusta Savage, Richard Bruce Nugent and Arthur Fauset. In many cases, Gumby was the only person to keep these documents years after the events occurred. One example is a short series of letters on "Our National Capital", a speech given by Frederick Douglass. The letters were written between Grace Greenwood and Douglass himself.

He was the Great God Gumby – God of his studio, God of all he surveyed, God could do no wrong. He allowed himself the luxury of temperament ... He was a true person and in reality he was the God he called himself

—Richard Bruce Nugent on Gumby at the time of his book studio.

Charles W. Newman, Gumby's financial backer, was badly affected by the Wall Street crash of 1929 and Gumby's studio lost the support of its regular patrons. The Wall Street Crash forced Gumby to abandon his studio and sell many of his precious editions, and store his scrapbooks in the cellar of a friend's house.

Gumby was openly gay, and his book studio became a gathering place for the LGBT community in Harlem. He was described as a "dandy" and a "Social Butterfly", his style being described by Nugent as "Fancy clothes, a perennial walking stick, pale yellow kid gloves, and a diamond stick-pin made him the Beau Brummell of his particular little group".

== Collection ==
In September 1901, aged 16, Gumby made his first scrapbook with clippings concerning the assassination of President McKinley. Gumby had organized his clippings by 1910, and took his archival work seriously, visiting similar collections in libraries across the United States and Canada. Gumby also became acquainted with fellow African-American archivist, Arturo Alfonso Schomburg. Working as a waiter at Columbia University Gumby began fraternizing with academia and students, adding clippings to his collection about popular professors and Columbia's president, Nicholas Murray Butler. In 1925 Gumby's collection so crowded his 2½ rooms that he was forced to lease the entire second-floor unpartitioned apartment of the house in which he lived. Gumby initially found it easy to acquire his collection as "Negro" items were considered of little interest to book dealers.

The scrapbooks contain autographed photos, stories and letters from such notable performers as Paul Robeson, Josephine Baker, Langston Hughes, Cab Calloway, Louis Armstrong, Count Basie and Ethel Waters, and letters and autographs from Black historical figures such as Frederick Douglass, William Lloyd Garrison, Booker T. Washington, George Washington Carver, Father Divine, W.E.B. Du Bois, and Marcus Garvey.

Gumby kept collecting while hospitalized, including articles about his hospitalization, get-well cards and photographs of friends who visited him. Upon his release from hospital Gumby retrieved and began restoring his collection, and continued to add to them. In 1950 Gumby donated his collection to Columbia University and in 1951, Columbia hired him for eight months to help organize the collections. Gumby continued to add to his scrapbooks until his death from complications from tuberculosis in 1961. The 300 scrapbooks are part of Columbia's Rare Book and Manuscript Library in Butler Library as the Alexander Gumby Collection of Negroiana.

In the early 1920s he exhibited his collections in cities along the East Coast of America, and was subsequently included in the 1922 edition of the Private Book Collectors' Who's Who.

Gumby said of his collection that it "... could well be called 'The Unwritten History ... There are so many surprising and startling historical events pertaining to, or relating to the American Negro that are not recorded in the Standard Histories, dictionaries and school text-books, or if so, they are shaded so that they sound like a Ripley's 'Believe It or Not.'" A variety of different formats make up the scrapbooks including newspaper stories and magazine articles, and autographs, letters, photos, theatre programmes and documents concerning slavery. The scrapbooks have subsequently been converted to microfilm.

== See also ==
- Harlem Renaissance
