= Schomburg Center for Research in Black Culture =

Public research library in New York City

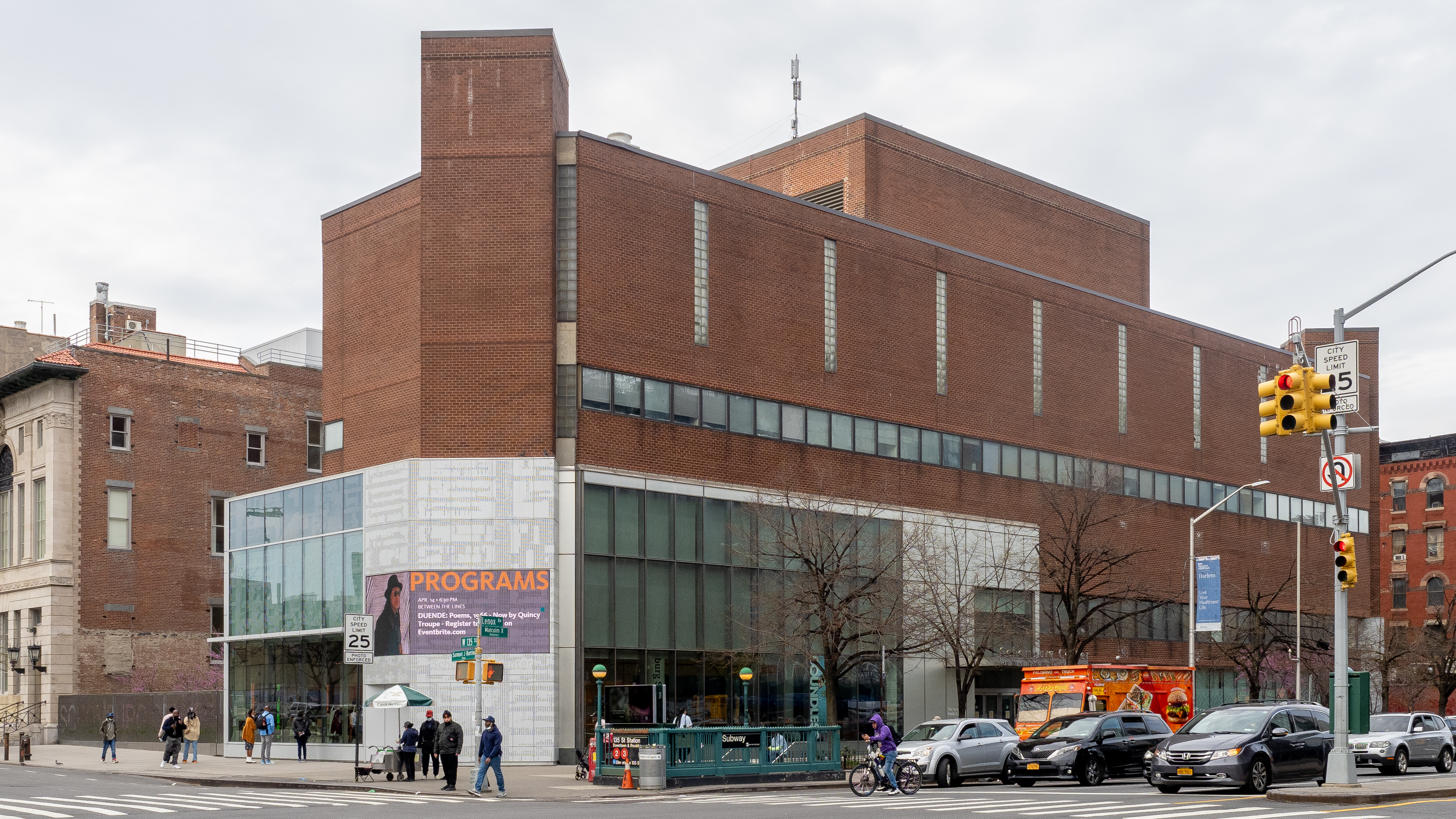
- Location: United States
- Type: Research library
- Established: 1905 (as the 135th Street Branch); 1925 (as the Division of Negro Literature, History and Prints)
- Architects: Bond Ryder & Associates

Collection
- Items collected: Poems by Phillis Wheatley, papers of Ralph Bunche, Malcolm X, and Hiram Rhodes Revels
- Size: 10 million

Other information
- Director: Joy L. Bivins
- Website: Official website
- Schomburg Center for Research in Black Culture
- U.S. National Register of Historic Places
- U.S. National Historic Landmark
- U.S. Historic district – Contributing property
- New York State Register of Historic Places
- New York City Landmark
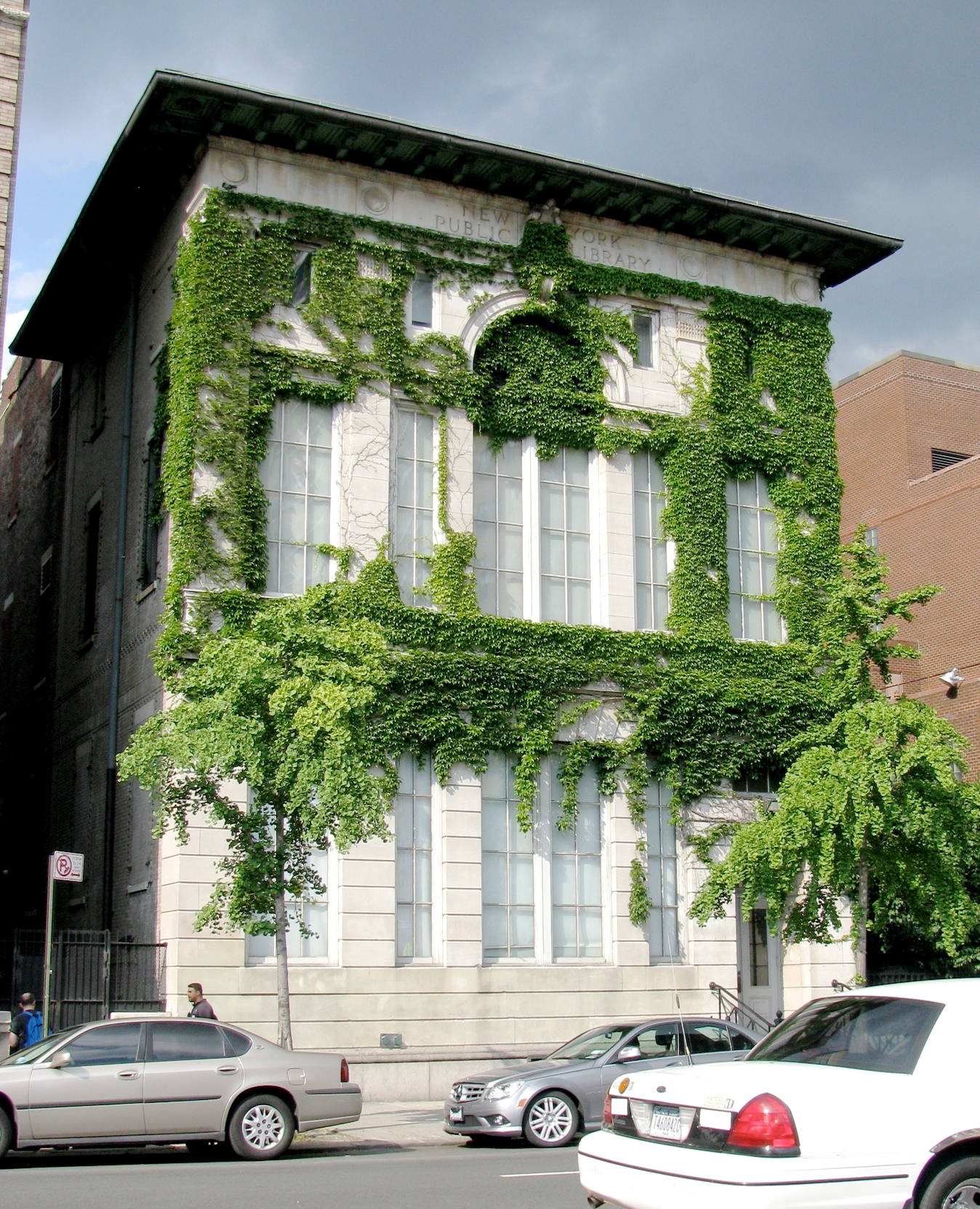
- The original building (2009)
- Location: 103 West 135th Street; Manhattan, New York City
- Coordinates: 40°48′52″N 73°56′28″W
- Architect: Charles Follen McKim
- Architectural style: Italian Renaissance Palazzo
- Part of: Central Harlem North Historic District (ID100009934)
- NRHP reference No.: 78001881
- NYSRHP No.: 06101.001765
- NYCL No.: 1133

Significant dates
- Added to NRHP: September 21, 1978
- Designated NHL: December 23, 2016
- Designated NYSRHP: June 23, 1980
- Designated NYCL: February 3, 1981

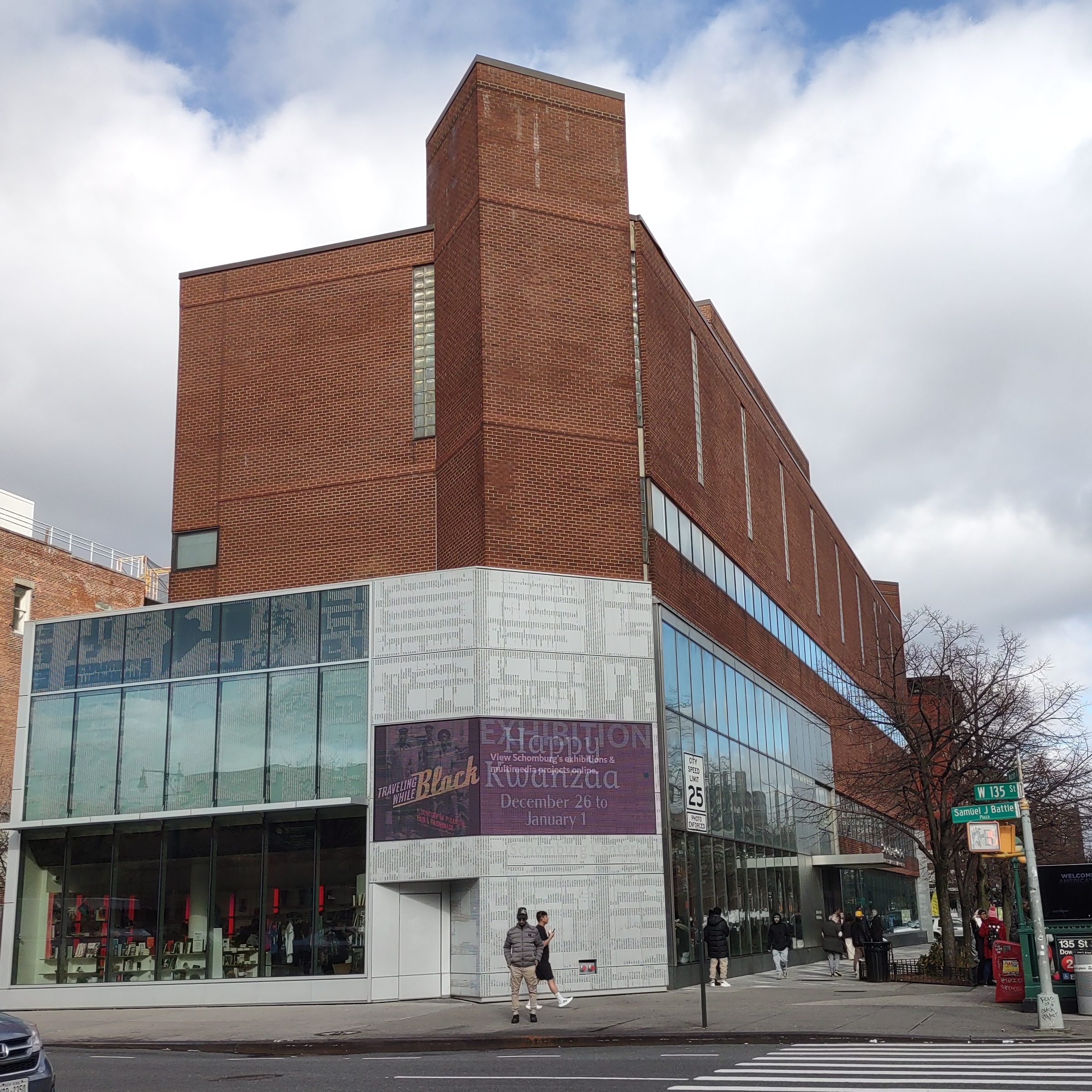
Schomburg Center

The Schomburg Center for Research in Black Culture is a research library of the New York Public Library (NYPL) and an archive repository for information on people of African descent worldwide. Located at 515 Malcolm X Boulevard (Lenox Avenue) between West 135th and 136th Streets in the Harlem neighborhood of Manhattan, New York City, it was founded in 1905 as the NYPL's 135th Street Branch. It has, almost from its inception, been an integral part of the Harlem community and is named for Afro-Puerto Rican scholar Arturo Alfonso Schomburg. The center is split across three structures: the original 135th Street Branch by McKim, Mead & White, a 1980 addition on Lenox Avenue by J. Max Bond Jr., and a connector between the two buildings.

The resources of the center are broken up into five divisions: the Art and Artifacts Division; the Jean Blackwell Hutson General Research and Reference Division; the Manuscripts, Archives and Rare Books Division; the Moving Image and Recorded Sound Division; and the Photographs and Prints Division. The center hosts readings, discussions, art exhibitions, and theatrical events. It is open to the general public. The center's buildings are on the National Register of Historic Places as a National Historic Landmark, and its original location is a New York City designated landmark.

== Early history ==
=== 135th Street branch ===
In 1901, Andrew Carnegie tentatively agreed to donate $5.2 million (equivalent to $201,240,000 in 2025) to construct 65 branch libraries in New York City, with the requirement that the City provide the land and maintain the buildings once construction was complete. Later in 1901, Carnegie formally signed a contract with the City of New York to transfer his donation to the city to then allow it to justify purchasing the land to house the libraries. McKim, Mead & White were chosen as the architects and Charles Follen McKim designed the three-story library building at 103 West 135th Street in the Italian Renaissance Palazzo mode. At its opening on July 14, 1905, the library had 10,000 books and the librarian in charge was Gertrude Cohen.

=== Rose tenure (1920–1942) ===
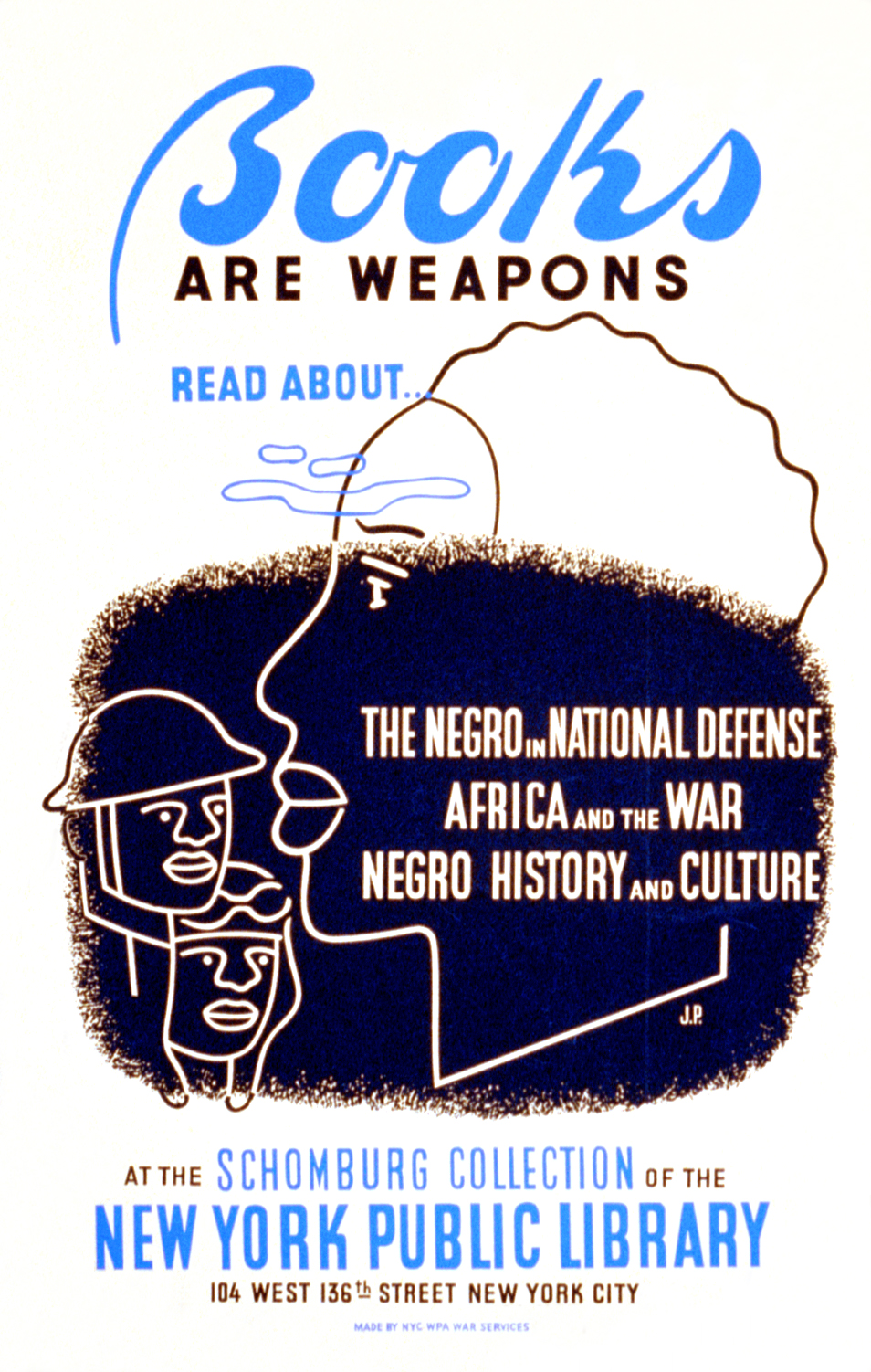
World War II-era WPA poster promoting use of the Schomburg Collection of the New York Public Library (Federal Art Project 1941–43)

In 1920, Ernestine Rose, a white woman born in Bridgehampton in 1880, became the branch librarian. She quickly integrated the all-white library staff. Catherine Allen Latimer, the first African-American librarian hired by the NYPL, was sent to work with Rose, as was Roberta Bosely months later. Some time later, Sadie Peterson Delaney became employed at the branch. Together, they created a plan to assist in integrating reading into the lives of the library attendees and cooperated with schools and social organizations in the community.

In 1921, the library hosted the first exhibition of African-American art in Harlem; it became an annual event. The library became a focal point to the burgeoning Harlem Renaissance.

In 1923, the 135th Street branch was the only branch in New York City employing Negroes as librarians, and consequently when Regina M. Anderson was hired by the NYPL, she was sent to work at the 135th Street branch.

Rose issued a report to the American Library Association, in 1923, which stated that requests for books about Negroes or written by Negroes had been increasing, as was the demand for professionally trained colored librarians. In late 1924, Rose called a meeting, with attendees including Arturo Alfonso Schomburg, James Weldon Johnson, Hubert Harrison, that decided to focus on preserving rare books, and solicit donations to enhance its African-American collection. On May 8, 1925, it began operating as the Division of Negro Literature, History and Prints, a division of the NYPL. In 1926, Schomburg was interested in selling his collection of African-American literature because he wanted it to be available to the general public, but he wanted the collection to stay in Harlem. Rose and the National Urban League convinced the Carnegie Foundation to pay $10,000 to Schomburg and then donate the books to the library. In 1926, the center's collection won acclaim with the addition of Schomburg's personal collection. By donating his collection, Schomburg sought to show that black people had a history and a culture and thus were not inferior to other races. About 5,000 objects in Schomburg's collection were donated.

In 1929, Anderson wanted a promotion, and enlisted the help of W. E. B. Du Bois and Walter Francis White when she was being discriminated against by not being promoted. After letters of intervention on her behalf by Du Bois and White, and a boycott of the library by White, Anderson was promoted and transferred to the Rivington Street branch of the NYPL.

By 1930, the center had 18,000 volumes. In 1932, Schomburg became the first curator of his collection, until he died in 1938. In 1935, the Center developed a project to deliver books once a week to those handicapped severely enough that they could not make it to the library. Dr. Lawrence D. Reddick became the second curator of the Schomburg Collection of Negro Literature. At the behest of Reddick, in October 1940, the entire Division of Negro History, Literature and Prints was renamed the Schomburg Collection of Negro History and Literature.

In 1942, Rose retired after an extension was built onto the rear of the building, at a time when the library had 40,000 books. Dorothy Robinson Homer replaced her as branch librarian, after the Citizen's Committee of the 135th Street Branch Library specifically requested a Negro to replace Rose.

=== Countee Cullen branch ===
After the extension was built, the library became known as the Countee Cullen Library branch, and the 135th Street Library is still considered the original location of the Countee Cullen branch, although that name is now only used for the extension itself on West 136th Street.

Homer created a room of books just for young adults and created the American Negro Theatre in the basement that spawned the play Anna Lucasta, which was moved to Broadway. She kept the emphasis on building a community center for art, music and drama. She put on art exhibits that favored unknown, young artists of all races.

After the outbreak of WWII, Homer started a program of monthly concert recitals in the auditorium to enhance public spirit, but the demand by performers and audience members to continue the practice made it permanent.

=== Hutson tenure (1948–1980) ===
In 1948, Jean Blackwell was named the director of the center. In a 1966 speech, Hutson warned of the perilous status of the Schomburg collection.

In 1971, the center began being supported by the privately funded Schomburg Corporation. The next year, funds by New York City were allocated to renovate the building at 103 West 135th, and it was renamed the building of the Schomburg Collection for Research in Black Culture. Simultaneously, the entire Schomburg collection was rounded up from various branch libraries and transferred to the center. In 1972, it was designated as one of NYPL's research libraries.

In 1973, a building on the west side of Lenox Ave between 135th and 136th was bought to be demolished and a new building could be constructed. The location was chosen due to its proximity to other community agencies and because it was the "scene of the Harlem Renaissance." In 1978, the building on 135th Street between Lenox and 7th Avenues was entered into the National Register of Historic Places. In 1979, it was formally listed in the NRHP.

== Schomburg Center ==
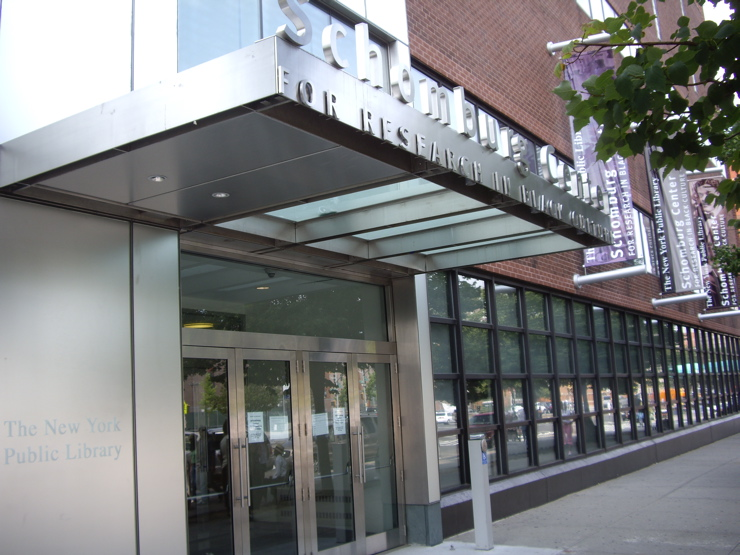
The entrance to the center

In 1980, a new Schomburg Center was founded at 515 Lenox Avenue, within a building designed by J. Max Bond Jr. in a modernist/African Revival style. In 1981, the original building on West 135th Street which held the Schomburg Collection was designated a New York City Landmark. In 2016, both the original and current buildings, now joined by a connector, were designated a National Historic Landmark.

The Roger Furman Theatre is located within the building.

=== Wray tenure (1981–1983) ===
In 1981, Wendell L. Wray became the director of the center. There were protests over Wray's decision to not hire an African-American man to head the center's Manuscript, Archives, and Rare Books Division, instead hiring Robert Morris. In 1983, Wray resigned to pursue academic research and Catherine Hooker was named acting director.

=== Dodson tenure (1984–2011) ===
Howard Dodson became the director in 1984, at a time when the Schomburg was primarily a cultural center visited by tourists and schoolchildren and its research facilities were known only to scholars. In 1984, the Schomburg's collection was at 5 million. In 1984, attendance was 40,000 a year. As early as 1984, the Schomburg was recognized as the most important institution in the world for collections of art and literature of people in Africa or its diaspora. In 1983, a scholars-in-residence program started at the center. In 1986, an exhibit entitled Give me your poor... sparked controversy. In March 1987, a public funding campaign was started to raise money to renovate the old library and to enhance the new Center's housing and its functions.

In 1991, additions to the Schomburg Center were completed. The new center on Malcolm X was expanded to include an auditorium and a connection to the old landmark building on 135th. The Art and Artifacts Division and the Moving Image and Recorded Sound Division were moved into the old landmark building. In 2000, the Schomburg Center held an exhibition titled "Lest We Forget: The Triumph Over Slavery", which later went on tour around the world for more than a decade under the sponsorship of UNESCO's Slave Route Project. In 2005, the center held an exhibition of letters, photographs and other materials related to Malcolm X. In 2007, the building was renovated and expanded in an $11 million project. The Schomburg Center had 120,000 visitors a year; by 2010, Dodson announced he would retire in early 2011.

In 2007, the Schomburg Center was one of the sponsors of the African Burial Ground National Monument.

=== Muhammad tenure (2011–2016) ===
External videos
- Tour of the Schomburg Center conducted by Khalil Gibran Muhammad, May 27, 2015, C-SPAN

Following Howard Dodson's announcement of his retirement in 2010, Khalil Gibran Muhammad, great-grandson of Elijah Muhammad and professor of history at Indiana University, was announced as his replacement. In the summer of 2011, Muhammad became the fifth director of the Schomburg. His stated goals were for the Schomburg to be a focal point for young adults and to collaborate with the local community, to not only reinforce its pride, but also for the center to be a gateway for revealing the history of Black people worldwide. In July, the center began an exhibit of Malcolm X footage and prints entitled Malcolm X: the Search for Truth.

=== Young tenure (2016–2020) ===
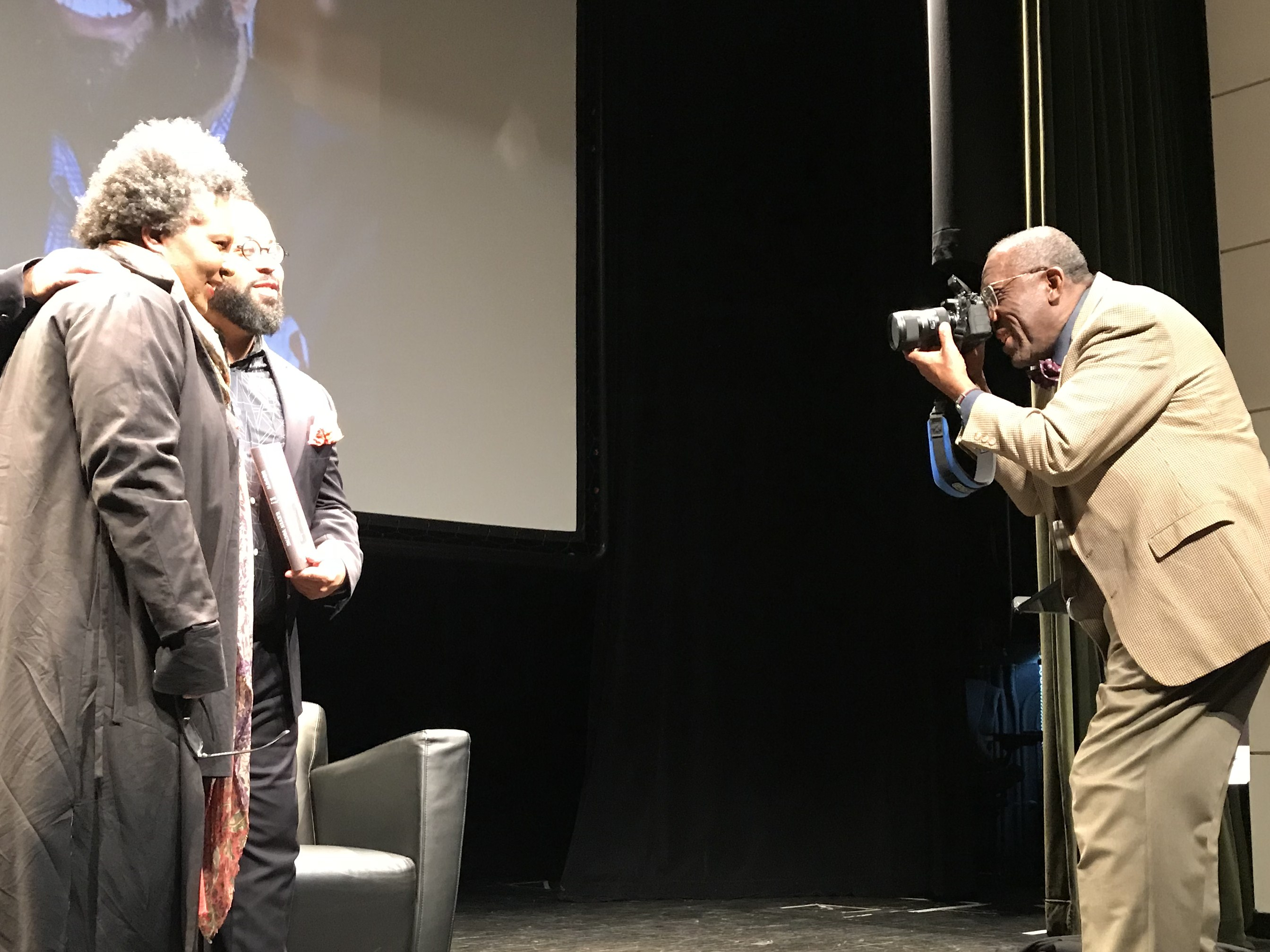
Bob Gore photographing Kevin Young and Claudia Rankine

On August 1, 2016, the New York Public Library announced that poet and academic Kevin Young would begin as director of the Schomburg in the late fall of 2016. During Young's four-year tenure, attendance increased by 40%, to 300,000 visitors per year. He is credited with raising more than $10 million in grants and donations, and securing several high-profile acquisitions, including the papers of James Baldwin, Harry Belafonte, and the couple Ossie Davis and Ruby Dee. A $22.3 million renovation of the Schomburg Center buildings was completed in 2017. The project included new gallery and research areas; upgrades to the Langston Hughes Auditorium; a two-story annex; and upgrades to the second-floor Rare Books Reading Room.

Young stepped down at the end of 2020 to assume a new position as director of the Smithsonian's National Museum of African American History and Culture.

=== Bivins tenure (2021–present) ===
In 2021, Joy Bivins was appointed as the director of the Schomburg Center. The next year, the Dormitory Authority of the State of New York provided $8 million for a renovation of the Schomburg Center buildings. The work included energy-efficiency and safety upgrades, in addition to a replacement of existing windows and roof. The NYPL hosted various events in 2025 to celebrate the Schomburg Collection's 100th anniversary.

== Collection ==
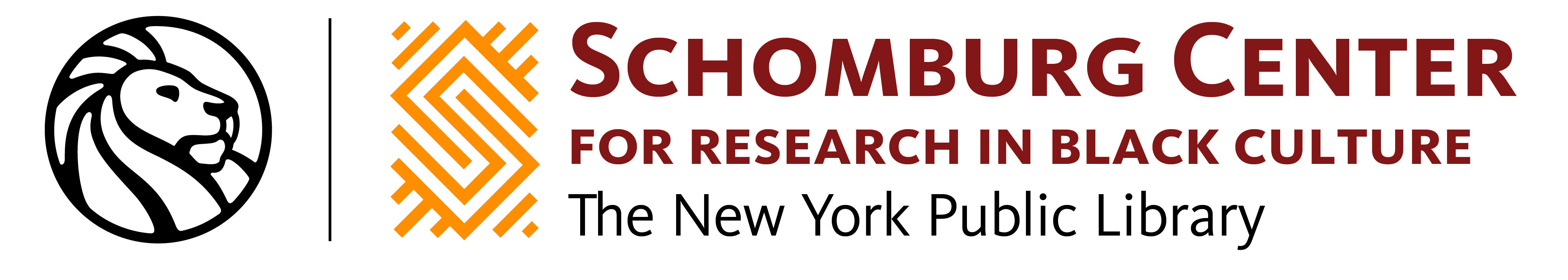
NYPL Schomburg Center for Research in Black Culture logo

In 1998, the Schomburg Collection was considered as consisting of the rarest, and most useful, Afrocentric artifacts of any public library in the United States. At least as of late 2006, it is viewed as the most prestigious for African-American materials in the country. As of 2010, the Collection stood at 10 million objects, The center contains a signed first edition of a book of poems by Phillis Wheatley, and archival material of Melville J. Herskovits, John Henrik Clarke, Lorraine Hansberry, Malcolm X and Nat King Cole. The collection includes the files, or papers of the International Labor Defense, the Civil Rights Congress, the Symphony of the New World, the National Negro Congress, and the files of the South African Dennis Brutus Defense Committee (restricted). Additionally, it includes the papers of Lawrence Brown (1893–1973), Melva L. Price, Ralph Bunche, Léon Damas, Thomas Henderson Kerr Jr., William Pickens, Hiram Rhodes Revels, and Clarence Cameron White. The collection also includes manuscripts of Alexander Crummell and John Edward Bruce, manuscripts of slavery, abolitionism, and the West Indies, and letters and unpublished manuscripts by Langston Hughes. It includes some papers from Christian Fleetwood, Paul Robeson (restricted), Booker T. Washington, and Schomburg himself. It includes musical recordings, black and jazz periodicals, rare books and pamphlets, and tens of thousands of art objects. The center's collection includes documents signed by Toussaint Louverture and a rare recording of a speech by Marcus Garvey.

The Claude McKay Estate is represented by the Faith Childs Literary Agency. In the past, the center had acted as the literary representative of the heirs of Claude McKay.

== See also ==
- Moorland–Spingarn Research Center
- Auburn Avenue Research Library on African American Culture and History
- African American Library at the Gregory School
- List of National Historic Landmarks in New York City
- List of New York City Designated Landmarks in Manhattan above 110th Street
- National Register of Historic Places listings in Manhattan above 110th Street
