= Arturo Alfonso Schomburg =

Puerto Rican historian and writer (1874–1938)

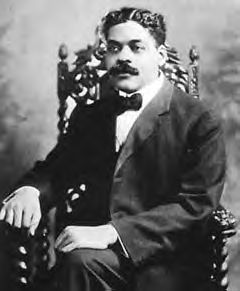
- Arturo Alfonso Schomburg, c. 1910
- Born: January 24, 1874; Santurce, Spanish Puerto Rico
- Died: June 10, 1938 (aged 64); Brooklyn, New York, U.S.
- Movement: Harlem Renaissance
- Spouse(s): Elizabeth Hatcher (m. 1895; died 1900) Elizabeth Morrow Taylor (m. 1902; died 1907) Elizabeth Green (m. 1914)
- Children: 8

Arturo Alfonso Schomburg (January 24, 1874 – June 10, 1938), was a Puerto Rican historian, writer, curator, and activist, who was based in New York City as an adult. He wrote numerous books. Schomburg was a Puerto Rican of African and German descent.

He moved to the United States in 1891, at the age of 17. He settled in New York City, where he researched and raised awareness of the contributions that Afro-Latin Americans and African Americans have made to society. As a youth, Schomburg was told that Black people had no significant history. He spent his life disproving that notion, gathering evidence of Black achievement and celebrating the richness of Black life. He was an important intellectual figure in the Harlem Renaissance. Over the years, he collected literature, art, slave narratives, and other materials of African history. His collection was purchased to become the basis of the Schomburg Center for Research in Black Culture, named in his honor, at the New York Public Library (NYPL) branch in Harlem.

== Early years ==
Schomburg was born and spent the majority of his childhood in the town of Santurce in the Captaincy General of Puerto Rico. His parents were Mary Joseph, a freeborn Black midwife from St. Croix in the Danish West Indies, and Carlos Federico Schomburg, a merchant. The latter was the son of a local Puerto Rican woman and a German immigrant to the island.

The young Schomburg was baptized as a Catholic, with the name Arturo Alfonso, at the Church of San Francisco de Asis in Santurce, San Juan.

While Schomburg was in grade school, one of his teachers claimed that Black people had no history, heroes or accomplishments. Inspired to prove the teacher wrong, Schomburg determined that he would find and document the accomplishments of Africans on their own continent and in the diaspora.

Schomburg was educated at San Juan's Instituto Popular, where he learned commercial printing. At St. Thomas College on the island of St. Thomas in the Danish West Indies, he studied Negro literature.

He became a member of the "Revolutionary Committee of Puerto Rico" and became an active advocate of Puerto Rico's and Cuba's independence from Spain. In 1892, Schomburg co-founded Las Dos Antillas (The Two Islands), a political club that advocated for the independence of Cuba and Puerto Rico. The club existed from 1892 to 1898, and members discussed issues such as providing weapons, medical supplies, and financial aid to independence movements.

== Marriage and family ==
Schomburg married three times, after losing his first two wives to early deaths. He had a total of eight children. On June 30, 1895, he married Elizabeth Hatcher of Staunton, Virginia. She had come to New York as part of a wave of African-American migration from the South that would increase in the 20th century and be known as the Great Migration. They had three sons: Máximo Gómez (named after the Dominican military leader of the Cuban struggle for independence); Arthur Alfonso Jr., and Kingsley Guarionex Schomburg (named after Guarionex, a renowned cacique of the Taíno).

Elizabeth died in 1900; the widower Schomburg married again, to Elizabeth Morrow Taylor of Williamsburg, a village in Rockingham County, North Carolina. They were married on March 17, 1902, and had two sons: Reginald Stanton and Nathaniel José Schomburg. After Morrow Taylor died, Schomburg married Elizabeth Green, with whom he had three more children.

== Identity ==
Schomburg consistently identified as "Afroborinqueño" (Afro-Puerto Rican), rejecting binary racial categorizations and explicitly crediting Puerto Rican intellectuals Salvador Brau and José Julián Acosta as his primary inspirations for studying Black history. Rather than abandoning his Latino identity, Schomburg persevered in seeking ways of reconciling Black diasporic belonging with Latin Pan-ethnic identification throughout his life. His name evolution from Arturo Alfonso to Arthur and back reflects strategic cultural navigation while maintaining core Puerto Rican identity, demonstrated by giving his children Spanish/Latino names and serving as a multilingual translator. Schomburg belonged to what scholars call a generation of "early Afro-Latino migrants" who built political networks and articulated revolutionary nationalism centered on projects of racial and social justice.

== Revolutionary networks ==
His co-founding of Las Dos Antillas (1892) with Rafael Serra and Rosendo Rodríguez created a space for Afro-Caribbean revolutionaries connected to broader Caribbean liberation movements. Schomburg's membership in the Afro-Cuban Masonic lodge El Sol de Cuba Lodge #38 connected him to transnational Caribbean revolutionary networks that shaped his later Pan-African organizing approach. His participation in José Martí's Partido Revolucionario Cubano demonstrates his commitment to Caribbean liberation that preceded and informed his African diaspora archival work.

== Career ==
In 1896, Schomburg began teaching Spanish in New York. From 1901 to 1906 Schomburg was employed as messenger and clerk in the law firm of Pryor, Mellis and Harris, New York City. In 1906, he began working for the Bankers Trust Company. Later, he became a supervisor of the Caribbean and Latin American Mail Section, and held that until he left in 1929.

While supporting himself and his family, Schomburg began his intellectual work of writing about Caribbean and African-American history. His first known article, "Is Hayti Decadent?", was published in 1904 in The Unique Advertiser. In 1909 he wrote Placido, a Cuban Martyr, a short pamphlet about the poet and independence fighter Gabriel de la Concepción Valdés. In the 1910 US Census, he is recorded as a printer working in a shop and living at 205 West 115th Street in Harlem, New York City.

== The Negro Society for Historical Research ==
In 1911, Schomburg co-founded with John Edward Bruce the Negro Society for Historical Research, to create an institute to support scholarly efforts. For the first time, it brought together African, West Indian, and Afro-American scholars. In 1914, Schomburg joined the exclusive American Negro Academy, becoming, from 1920 to 1928, the fifth and last President of the organization. Founded in Washington, D.C., in 1897, this first major African American learned society brought together scholars, editors, and activists to refute racist scholarship, promote Black claims to individual, social, and political equality, and publish the history and sociology of African American life.

This was a period of the founding of societies to encourage scholarship in African-American history. In 1915, Dr. Carter G. Woodson co-founded the Association for the Study of Negro Life and History (now called the Association for the Study of African American Life and History) and began publishing the Journal of Negro History.

Schomburg became involved in the Harlem Renaissance movement, which spread to other African-American communities in the U.S. The concentration of Black people in Harlem from across the US and Caribbean led to a flowering of arts, as well as intellectual and political movements. Schomburg co-edited the 1912 edition of Daniel Alexander Payne Murray's Encyclopedia of the Colored Race. He later became disillusioned with the Harlem Renaissance, because he felt that there were no more revolutionaries within it. He told anthologist Nancy Cunard that she should "not expect to find anything revolutionary or critical in these subjected fellows' writings.... [T]hey have been bought and paid for by white people".

In 1916 Schomburg published the first notable bibliography of African-American poetry, A Bibliographical Checklist of American Negro Poetry.

In March 1925 Schomburg published his essay "The Negro Digs Up His Past" in an issue of Survey Graphic devoted to the intellectual life of Harlem. It had widespread distribution and influence. In "The Negro Digs Up His Past," Schomburg was trying to lay the groundwork for an intellectual refutation of racism. The autodidact historian John Henrik Clarke told of being so inspired by the essay that at the age of 17 he left home in Columbus, Georgia, to seek out Mr. Schomburg to further his studies in African history. Alain Locke included the essay in his edited collection The New Negro.

In March 1926, Schomburg visited Spain. "His mission was to research and explore centuries of Black life in Europe, including that of the painter Juan de Pareja. A notable artist in his own right, Pareja was an enslaved studio assistant to famed Spanish painter Diego Velázquez". The Metropolitan Museum of Art stated, "Schomburg was vital to the recovery of Pareja’s work".

== The Schomburg Collection of Negro Literature and Art ==
The New York Public Library and the librarian of the 135th Street Branch, Ernestine Rose, purchased Schomburg's private collection of more than 4,000 books for $10,000, funded by the Carnegie Corporation in 1926. This purchase would signal the beginning of the transformation of the 135th street's branch into the Schomburg Center. His collection included a variety of items, including the acquisition of three missing chapters from “The Autobiography of Malcolm X,” that were cut from his manuscript after his death in 1965. They appointed Schomburg curator of the Schomburg Collection of Negro Literature and Art, named in his honor, at the 135th Street Branch (Harlem) of the Library. It was later renamed the Arthur Schomburg Center for Research in Black Culture.

In 1929 Fisk University President Charles S. Johnson invited Schomburg to curate the Negro Collection at the library of Fisk in Nashville, Tennessee. He assisted in the architectural design contributing to the construction of a reading room and browsing space. By the end of Schomburg's tenure at Fisk he had expanded the library's collection from 106 items to 4,600. During 1932 he traveled to Cuba. While there he met various Cuban artists and writers, and acquired more material for his studies.

He was granted an honorary membership of the Men's Business Club in Yonkers, New York. He also held the position of treasurer for the Loyal Sons of Africa in New York and was elevated being the past master of Prince Hall Lodge Number 38, Free and Accepted Masons (F.A.M.) and Rising Sun Chapter Number 4, R.A.M.

== Archival methodology ==
Schomburg developed what can be termed "recovery historiography" - a systematic approach focused on gathering "vindicating evidences" to counter racist narratives and demonstrate global Black achievements. His archival philosophy emphasized recovery and transformation over traditional archival neutrality, prioritizing community access and democratic participation over institutional custody. Contemporary archival studies scholarship positions Schomburg as a foundational theorist who anticipated community archives movements and developed methodology for countering archival "symbolic annihilation" of marginalized communities.

== Later years ==
Following dental surgery, Schomburg became ill and died in Madison Park Hospital in Brooklyn on June 10, 1938. He received a private funeral on June 12 at Siloam Presbyterian Church. He is buried in the Locust Grove section of Cypress Hills Cemetery.

== Legacy ==
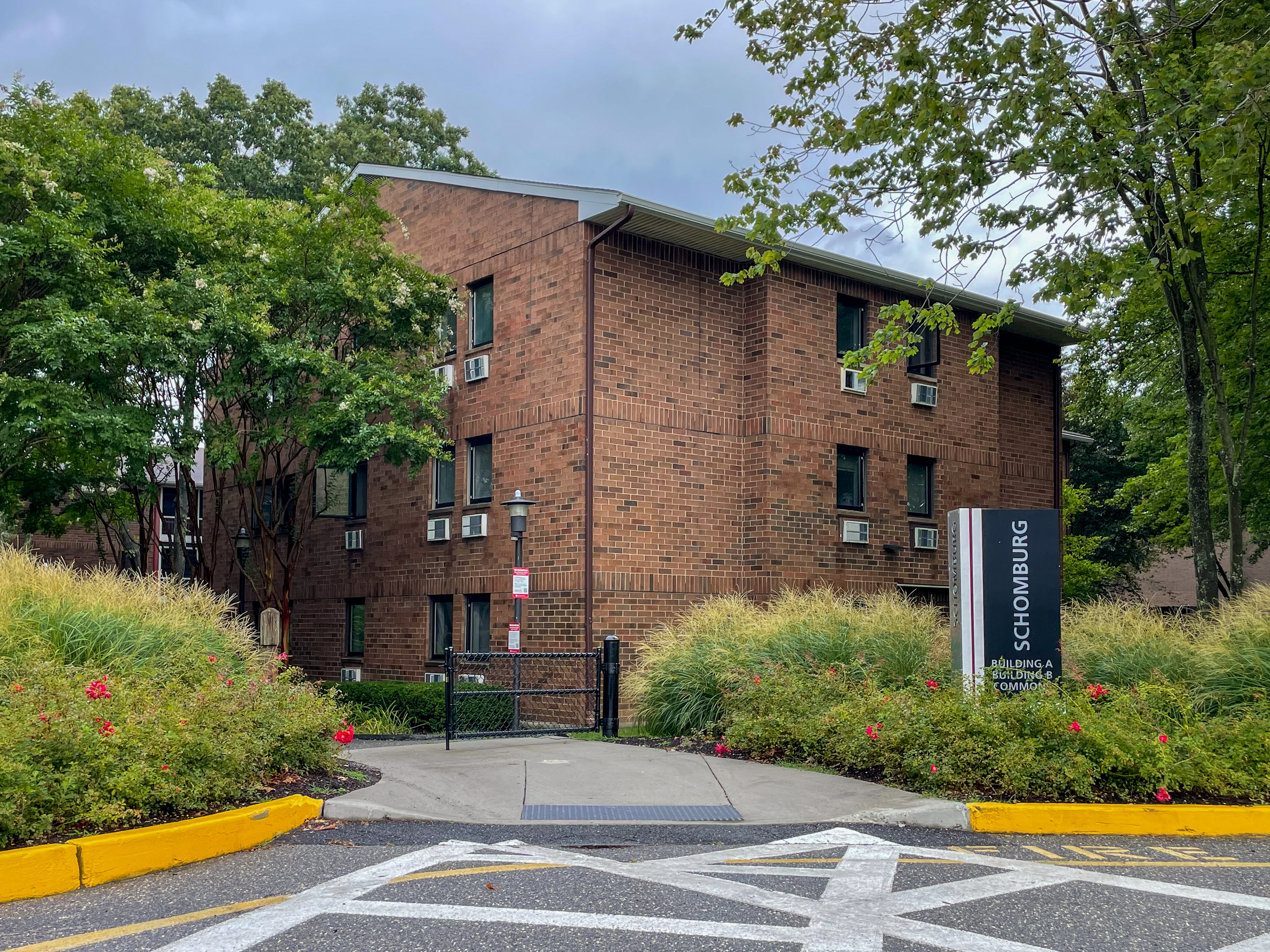
Schomburg Apartments at Stony Brook University

By the 1920s Schomburg had amassed a collection which consisted of artworks, manuscripts, rare books, slave narratives and other artifacts of Black history. The collection formed the cornerstone of the Library's Division of Negro History at its 135th Street Branch in Harlem. The library appointed Schomburg curator of the collection, which was named in his honor: the Schomburg Center for Research in Black Culture. Schomburg used his proceeds from the sale to fund travel to Spain, France, Germany and England, to seek out more pieces of black history to add to the collection.

Arturo Alfonso Schomburg's work served as an inspiration to Puerto Ricans, Latinos and Afro-Americans alike. During the Harlem Renaissance, Zora Neale Hurston and others used Schomburg's materials. The power of knowing about the great contributions that Afro-Latin Americans and Afro-Americans have made to society helped advance the civil rights movement.

- In 2002, scholar Molefi Kete Asante included Schomburg on his list of 100 Greatest African Americans. To honor Schomburg, Hampshire College awards a $30,000 merit-based scholarship in his name for students who "demonstrate promise in the areas of strong academic performance and leadership at Hampshire College and in the community."
- The College of Arts and Sciences at University at Buffalo has a fellowship named in honor of Schomburg.
- A residence hall at New York's Stony Brook University is named for Schomburg.
- In 2020, the United States Postal Service featured Schomburg on a postage stamp as part of its series on the Harlem Renaissance.
- In 2025, Mayor-elect Zohran Mamdani announced he would use the Schomburg Quran for his private swearing-in ceremony. Following his inauguration, the Quran will be featured in a special New York Public Library exhibit commemorating the 100th anniversary of the Schomburg Center.

== See also ==
- List of Afro-Latinos
- List of Puerto Ricans
- Puerto Rican literature
- List of Puerto Ricans of African descent
- Afro-Puerto Rican
- German immigration to Puerto Rico
- L. S. Alexander Gumby, a fellow Black archivist during the Harlem Renaissance
- Carter G. Woodson
