= Ernestine Rose (librarian) =

20th-century American librarian

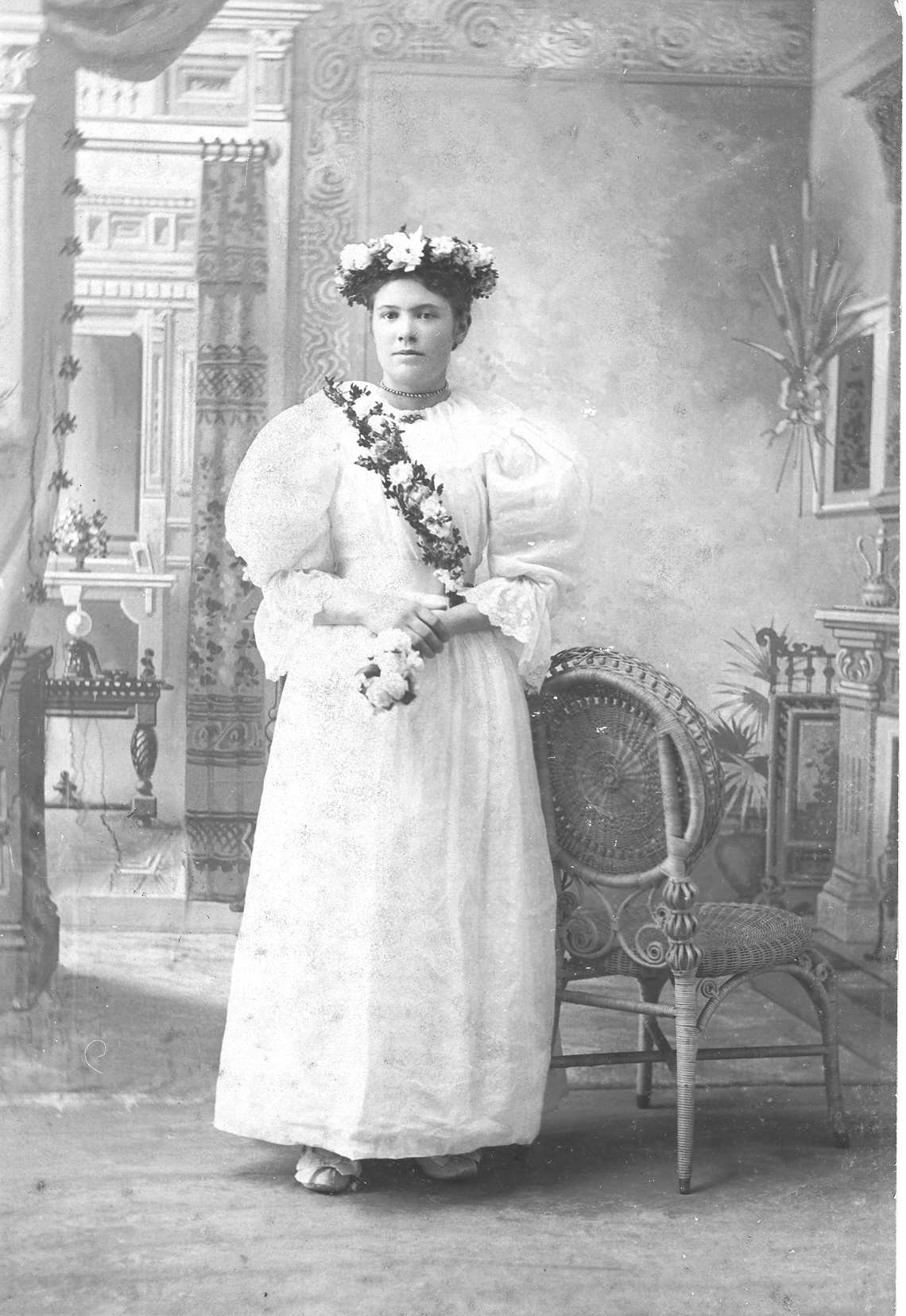
- Born: March 19, 1880; Bridgehampton
- Died: March 28, 1961 (aged 81)
- Education: Wesleyan University
- Occupation: Librarian
- Employer: New York Public Library

Ernestine Rose (March 19, 1880 – March 28, 1961) was a librarian at the New York Public Library responsible for the purchase and incorporation of the Arthur A. Schomburg collection.

== Early life and education ==
Ernestine Rose was born on March 19, 1880, in Bridgehampton, New York, and named after Ernestine Polowsky Rose, a 19th-century feminist. She studied at Wesleyan University and the New York State Library School at Albany, where she graduated in 1904. During her study at the New York State Library School, she worked a summer at a branch of the New York Public Library (NYPL) on the Lower East Side during her college education where she was exposed to Russian-Jewish immigrants and their culture. She emphasized programs that would help immigrants adjust to a new country rather than programs design to "Americanize" them, as was the norm at the time.

== Career ==
During World War I, Rose served as director of hospital libraries for the American Library Association (ALA). Returning to New York, in 1915, she served as head librarian at the Seward Park Branch, located in a Jewish immigrant community of New York City, until 1917. At Seward Park, she encouraged her assistants to become well versed in Jewish holidays and customs as well as Yiddish and Russian literature, intending to make them sensitive to the surrounding community.

Rose became the branch librarian at the 135th Street Branch in Harlem in 1920. The branch had opened in 1905 when the neighborhood was inhabited by middle-class Jews, but a migration of southern Black Americans, Caribbean, and Black South Americans following World War I changed the neighborhood to be a majority African-American neighborhood by the time Rose was appointed. The Harlem Renaissance of the time made Harlem a destination for black writers, artists, musicians, and scholars. Rose immediately noted that many cultural institutions weren't working with the new community and she wanted to make the library an integral part of the community that would provide guidance and promote racial pride. Her first role was to integrate the library staff, hiring four new library assistants of color, starting with Catherine Allen Latimer and including Pura Belpre and Nella Larsen Imes. She also worked to encourage community groups to hold meetings, reading and organized story hours, free public lectures, exhibitions of Black artists and sculptors and a reference collection of Black literature.

In 1922, Rose worked with the ALA to organize a group of librarians to exchange ideas and discuss issues of working with African Americans.

In 1924, Rose worked with Franklin F. Hopper, chief of the circulation department of the Central Branch, the National Urban League, and the American Association for Adult Education to secure a combined $15,000 grant from the Rosenwald Fund and the Carnegie Corporation. They formed the Harlem Committee, whose goals were to use the funds to develop cultural, vocational, and social programs within the Harlem community. They developed programs featuring well-known speakers, vocational classes through the YWCA and the Urban League. In 1926, the committee oversaw the purchase the Arthur A. Schomburg collection to incorporate into The Division of Negro Literature and History, later becoming the Schomburg Center for Research in Black Culture, at the library. The collection included "over 5,000 volume[s], 3,000 manuscripts, 2,000 etchings and portraits and several thousand pamphlets" showcasing the history and culture of African Americans. The grant also made possible the hiring of Schomburg to head the collection.

In 1933, the library worked with the Works Progress Administration (WPA) to host a writers project.

Rose retired from the NYPL in 1942.

== Bibliography ==
- "Vital Distinctions of a Library Apprentice Course"Bulletin of the American Library Association, Volume 10 (July 1916)
- "Serving New York’s Black City" Library Journal (March 1921) p. 255–258
- "Work with Negroes Round Table" Bulletin of the American Library Association, Volume 15 (July 1921)
- "Work with Negroes Round Table" Bulletin of the American Library Association, Volume 16 (July 1922)
- "The Public Library in American Life" (Columbia University Press, 1954)
- "Rescuing Ernestine Rose (1880–1961): Harlem Librarian and Social Activist, by Ann Sandford" Long Island History Journal, Volume 22, Issue 2 (2011)
