= Jean Blackwell Hutson =

American librarian and archivist

- Born: Jean Blackwell; September 7, 1914; Summerfield, Florida, United States
- Died: February 4, 1998 (aged 83); Harlem Hospital, New York
- Education: Barnard College, Columbia University School of Library Service
- Occupations: Librarian, curator, writer, archivist
- Spouse(s): Andy Razaf (1939–1947); John Hutson (1950-1998)
- Children: Jean Francis (d. 1992)
- Parent(s): Paul O. Blackwell (farmer); Sarah Myers Blackwell (elementary schoolteacher)

Jean Blackwell Hutson (born Jean Blackwell; September 7, 1914 – February 4, 1998) was an American librarian, archivist, writer, curator, educator, and later chief of the Schomburg Center for Research in Black Culture. The Schomburg Center dedicated their Research and Reference Division in honor of Hutson.

== Life and education ==
Jean Blackwell was born in Summerfield, Florida, and moved to Baltimore, Maryland, with her mother in 1918. She graduated valedictorian from Frederick Douglass High School in 1929. Blackwell continued her education at the University of Michigan, studying psychiatry, and transferred to Barnard College, where she graduated with a Bachelor of Arts in English in 1935. After completing her bachelor's degree, she applied to Enoch Pratt Library Training School, but was not admitted. She brought a lawsuit against Enoch Pratt which she ultimately won, believing that she was denied entrance because she was African-American. Blackwell eventually received her master's degree in library science from the Columbia University School of Library Service in 1936. She also acquired her teaching certificate from Columbia University in 1941.

Hutson was married twice, to Andy Razaf from 1939 to 1947 and to John Hutson from 1952 to 1957. She had a daughter, Jean Frances Hutson.

== Career ==
From 1936 to 1984, Hutson worked at multiple branches of the New York Public Library system, with a brief period as a school librarian at Paul Lawrence Dunbar High School in Baltimore, Maryland. Her most notable professional position was as curator and chief of the Schomburg Center for Research in Black Culture during which time she developed the Schomburg Dictionary Catalog. The collection at the Schomburg Center grew under her guidance to become "a major source for research on Black history and culture."

In the 1940s, during her time at the Schomburg Center, Hutson co-founded the Schomburg Corporation, a non-profit organization that lobbied for funding for the research center. Hutson was instrumental in marketing efforts that secured state, federal, and foundation grants for the following decades. These funds went towards preservation, assessment of the collection, and building a new facility. Under her charge, the center became well known in the Civil rights and Black Panther movements and in 1980, the new facility, designed by Max Bond, was opened to the public.

While she served at the Schomburg Center, Hutson also took on an adjunct professorship at the City College of New York. At the behest of her friend and former Schomburg page Joseph Borome, a librarian at Columbia University, Hutson taught courses in Black studies at the City College from 1962 to 1971. She resigned from the role after supporters of Black studies called for a more radical approach.

Hutson's teaching resulted in a personal invitation from Kwame Nkrumah, the president of Ghana, for Hutson to assist with the development and creation of the African Collection at the University of Ghana. She moved to Ghana, where she spent 1964 and 1965 as the assistant librarian in charge of Africana. Hutson was also successful in making the Africana collection inclusive of Africans in Africa as well as the African diaspora.

During Hutson's lifetime, she was involved in many different civic, social, professional and cultural organizations. She was a member of the Delta Sigma Theta sorority, the NAACP, the American Library Association, the African Studies Association, and the Urban League.

Hutson retired in 1980. She remained actively involved in organizations such as the National Commission on Libraries and Information Science's Task Force on Library and Information Services to Cultural Minorities in the 1980s. She also wrote a chapter on the Schomburg Center in Black Bibliophiles and Collectors: Preservers of Black History (1990).

== Recognition ==
Hutson received the 1966 Annual Heritage Award from the Association for the Study of Negro Life and History and the 1980 Professional Service Award from the Black Librarians Caucus of the American Library Association.

In 1977 she received an honorary doctorate from King Memorial College. She was honored by Barnard College in 1990 and by Columbia University in 1992.

She was featured in Brian Lanker's 1989 exhibit I Dream a World.

SUNY Buffalo had a residency program in her name from 1992-2007. In 1994, the Jean Hutson General Research and Reference Division was named in her honor at the Schomburg Center.

== Death ==
On February 4, 1998, Hutson died at Harlem Hospital Center in New York City at age 83.
