= Barzillai (given name) =

Barzillai is a masculine given name. Notable people with the name include:

- Barzillai, biblical figure
- Barzillai ben Baruch Jabez, Turkish Talmudist of the seventeenth and eighteenth centuries
- Barzillai J. Chambers (1817–1895), American surveyor, lawyer, and politician
- Barzillai Gannett (1764–1832), U.S. Representative from Massachusetts
- Barzillai Gray (1824–1918), American judge
- Barzillai Jones, Dean of Lismore
- Barzillai Lew (1743–1822), African-American soldier
- Barzillai Quaife (1798–1873), English-born editor

== See also ==
- Barzilai (surname)
- Barzillai Weeks House
