= List of people from Nebraska =

State flag of Nebraska

Location of Nebraska in the United States

The following are notable people who were born in, raised in, or have lived for a significant period of time in the U.S. state of Nebraska.

== Native Americans ==
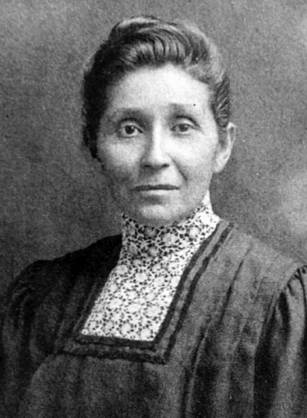
Susan La Flesche Picotte

- Crazy Horse (1838–1877), great warrior of the Oglala Lakota Sioux pre-statehood
- Chief Waukon Decorah (c. 1780–1868)
- He Dog (c. 1840–1936)
- Hononegah (c. 1814–1847) (Ho-Chunk)
- Francis La Flesche (1857–1932), first Native American anthropologist, author (Omaha people)
- Susan La Flesche Picotte (1865–1915), first Native American woman to earn a medical degree
- Susette LaFlesche Tibbles (1854–1903), writer and translator
- Little Hawk (1836–1900)
- Red Bird (c. 1788–1828), Ho-Chunk leader
- Red Cloud (1822–1909), chief of the Oglala Sioux
- Chief Standing Bear (c. 1829–1908), civil rights leader and at the fore of the petition to stay on traditional homelands post-removal as documented in the trial of Standing Bear; in this trial the state was led to recognize that Native Americans are human beings
- John Trudell (1946–2015), civil rights activist, community activist, speaker, poet, performer, musician, actor; Santee
- Raymond Yellow Thunder (1921–1972), ranch hand killed in a notable hate crime in 1972 in Gordon (Oglala Lakota)

== Public office ==
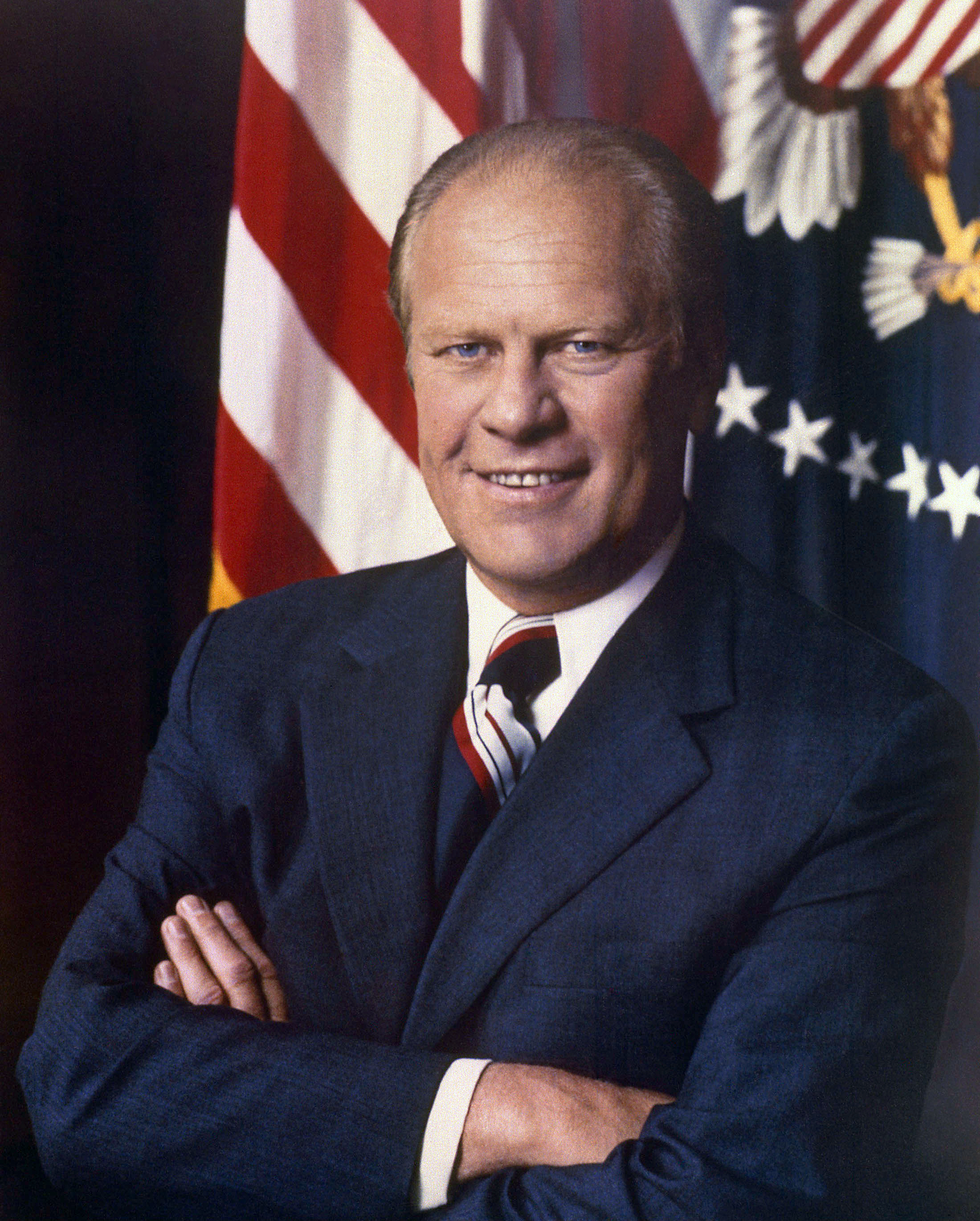
Gerald Ford

- Frank Aloysius Barrett (1892–1962), congressman, Wyoming, 1943–1950; governor of Wyoming, 1951–1953; Senator of Wyoming, 1953–1959
- Herbert Brownell Jr. (1904–1996), United States attorney general in President Eisenhower's cabinet, 1952–1957
- William Jennings Bryan (1860–1925), United States secretary of state; U.S. representative; Democratic Party nominee for president in 1896, 1900, and 1908; prosecuting attorney in Scopes Trial
- Hugh A. Butler (1878–1954), U.S. senator
- James Vincenzo Capone (1892–1952), federal Prohibition agent; oldest brother of gangster Al Capone; changed name to Richard James Hart
- Ernie Chambers (born 1937 in Omaha), Nebraska state senator; Nebraska State Legislature; civil rights activist
- Dick Cheney (1941–2025), former U.S. secretary of defense under George H.W. Bush, and 46th vice president of the United States under George W. Bush
- George E. Cryer (1875–1961), 32nd mayor of Los Angeles, 1921–1929
- Glenn Cunningham (1912–2003), U.S. representative and mayor of Omaha
- Carl Curtis (1905–2000), U.S. representative and U.S. senator
- Samuel Gordon Daily (1823–1866), U.S. representative for three terms
- Robert Vernon Denney (1916–1981), U.S. representative and United States district court judge
- Jane English (born 1940), Republican member of the Arkansas State Senate
- J. James Exon (1921–2005), governor of Nebraska and U.S. senator
- Gerald Ford (1913–2006), 38th president of the United States (born in Omaha, raised in Michigan)
- Dwight Griswold (1893–1954), governor of Nebraska and U.S. senator
- Chuck Hagel (born 1946), U.S. senator and 24th U.S. secretary of defense
- Robert Dinsmore Harrison (1897–1977), U.S. representative
- Edgar Howard (1858–1951), private secretary to William Jennings Bryan; lieutenant governor of Nebraska; U.S. Representative
- Megan Hunt (born 1986), Nebraska state legislator and first openly LGBT person elected to state legislature
- Bob Kerrey (born 1943), governor of Nebraska and U.S. senator
- Julius Sterling Morton (1832–1902), United States secretary of agriculture; founder of Arbor Day
- Kay A. Orr (born 1939), first Republican female governor (Nebraska) in U.S. history (1987–1991)
- Pete Peterson (born 1935), U.S. representative for Florida, U.S. ambassador to Vietnam
- Peter George Peterson (1926–2018), U.S. secretary of commerce under Richard Nixon; chair of the Federal Reserve Bank of New York; chair of the Council on Foreign Relations
- Donald Pike (1925–2008), Los Angeles County Superior Court commissioner
- Leo Ryan (1925–1978), U.S. representative (Democrat–California; born in Lincoln)
- Ted Sorensen (1928–2010), speechwriter and special counsel to President John F. Kennedy
- Charles Thone (1924–2018), governor of Nebraska and U.S. representative
- Kenneth S. Wherry (1892–1951), U.S. senator

== Military ==
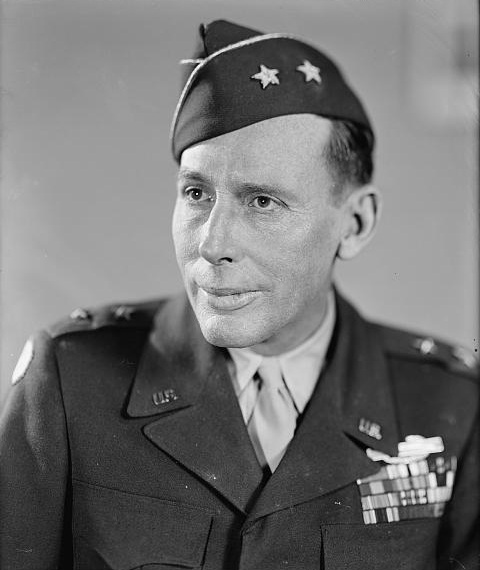
Butler B. Miltonberger

- Buffalo Bill Cody (1845–1917), iconic western figure; lived in Nebraska (born in Iowa Territory) while working as a scout for the 5th Cavalry; on July 17, 1876, at War Bonnet Creek, while dressed in his Wild West stage clothing, he killed and scalped Chief Yellow Hair (Cheyenne), claiming it a revenge for Custer; took up residence in Scout's Rest Ranch in 1886
- Alfred Gruenther (1899–1983), youngest four-star general in United States history; Supreme Allied Commander Europe
- William Hayward (1877–1944), commanding officer of the Harlem Hellfighters in World War I; later served as United States attorney for the Southern District of New York
- Galen B. Jackman (born 1951), United States Army major general (retired); Nancy Reagan's escort throughout the death and state funeral of Ronald Reagan; first commanding general of the Joint Force Headquarters National Capital Region
- Bob Kerrey (born 1943), United States Navy, LT(JG); commanded a Navy SEAL team in Vietnam; Medal of Honor recipient
- Francis P. Matthews (1887–1952), 49th United States secretary of the Navy during the administration of President Harry Truman
- Butler B. Miltonberger (1897–1977), commanded the 134th Infantry Regiment, 35th Division during World War II
- Jarvis Offutt (1894–1918), World War I aviator, namesake of Offutt Air Force Base
- Forrest S. Petersen (1922–1990), Navy and NASA test pilot, head of Naval Air Systems Command
- James G. Roudebush (born c. 1949), United States Air Force lieutenant general and doctor of medicine, current Surgeon General of the United States Air Force
- Albert Coady Wedemeyer (1897–1989), military planner and strategist

== Entertainment ==
=== Film and theater ===
A–M

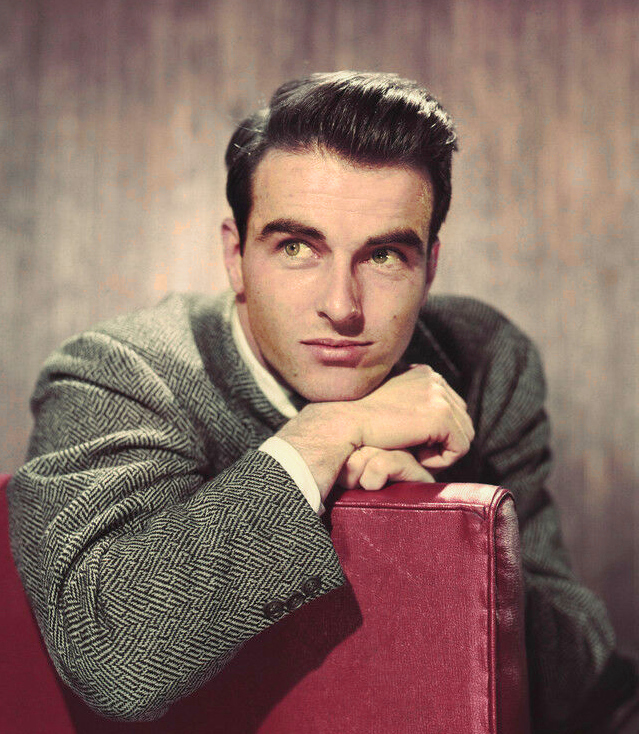
Montgomery Clift

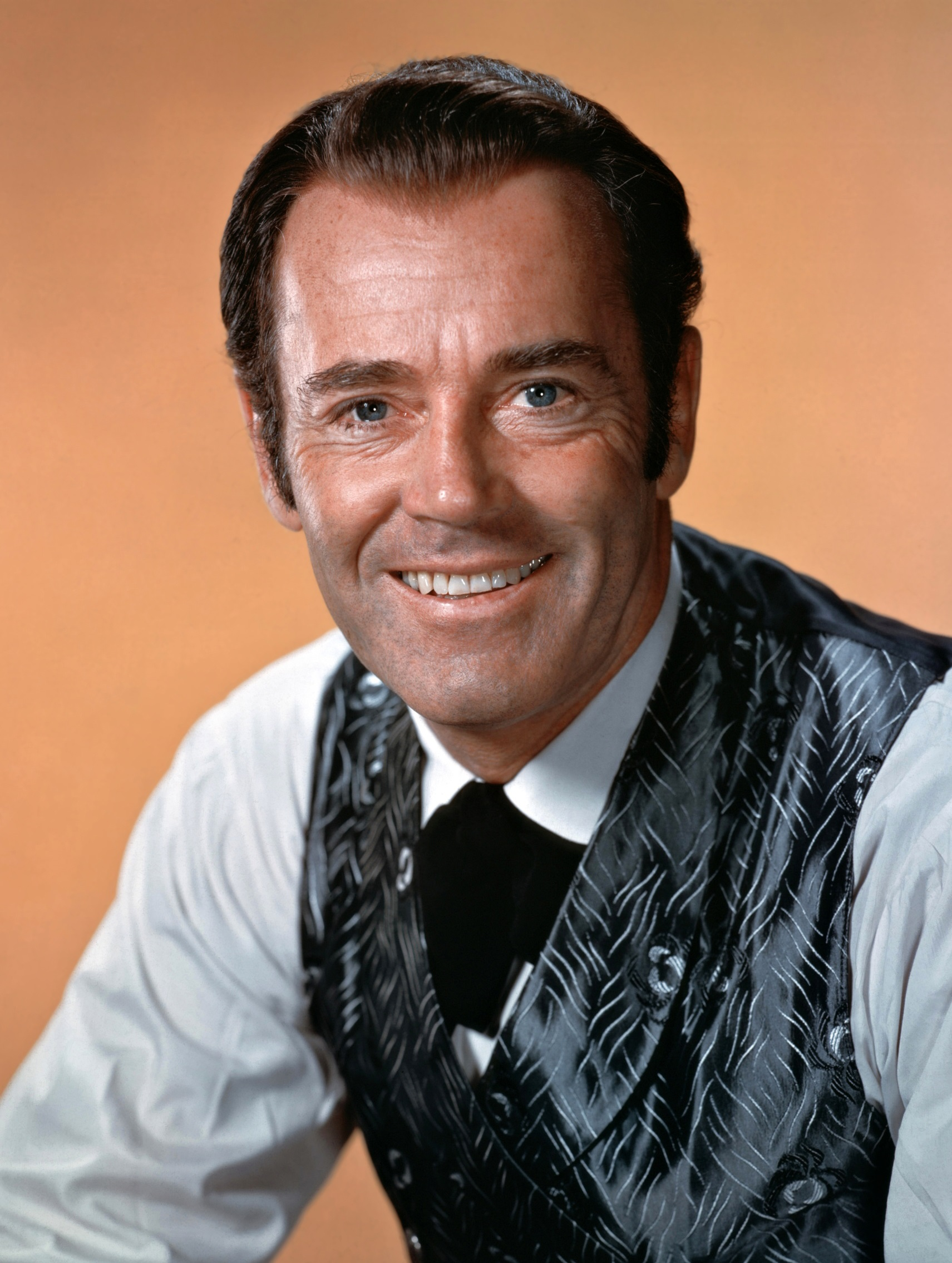
Henry Fonda

- Wesley Addy (1913–1996), actor, Network, The Verdict
- Adele Astaire (1897–1981), dancer and entertainer
- Fred Astaire (1899–1987), dancer and actor, The Band Wagon, Funny Face, The Towering Inferno, That's Entertainment!
- Pamela Austin (born 1941), actress, Kissin' Cousins
- Ray Baker (born 1948), actor, Silverado, Total Recall
- Andrew Rannells (born 1978), actor, The Book of Mormon
- John Beasley (born 1943), actor, Everwood
- Michael Biehn (born 1956), actor, The Terminator, Tombstone
- Moon Bloodgood (born 1975), actress, Terminator Salvation, Falling Skies
- Ward Bond (1903–1960), actor, The Searchers, The Quiet Man, Rio Bravo
- Marlon Brando (1924–2004), Academy Award-winning actor, The Godfather, On the Waterfront, Last Tango in Paris, Apocalypse Now
- Montgomery Clift (1920–1966), 4-time Oscar-nominated actor, From Here to Eternity, The Misfits, Red River, Judgment at Nuremberg
- James Coburn (1928–2002), Academy Award-winning actor, Our Man Flint, The Magnificent Seven, The Great Escape, Affliction
- James M. Connor (born 1960), actor
- Sandy Dennis (1937–1992), Academy Award-winning actress, Who's Afraid of Virginia Woolf?, Sweet November, The Out-of-Towners
- Adam Devine (born 1983), actor and comedian
- David Doyle (1929–1997), actor, Charlie's Angels
- Mary Doyle (1931–1995), actress
- Leslie Easterbrook (born 1949), actress, Police Academy films
- Henry Fonda (1905–1982), Academy Award-winning actor, Mister Roberts, 12 Angry Men, The Grapes of Wrath, On Golden Pond
- Hoot Gibson (1892–1962), actor and rodeo cowboy
- Coleen Gray (1922–2015), actress, Kiss of Death, Red River
- Leland Hayward (1902–1971), Hollywood and Broadway agent and producer
- Jean Heather (1921–1995), actress, Double Indemnity
- Hallee Hirsh (born 1987), actress, Flight 29 Down, JAG, ER
- Virginia Huston (1925–1981), actress, Out of the Past
- Bill Lee, overdub singer whose voice was used instead of Christopher Plummer's in the film version of The Sound of Music
- Harold Lloyd (1893–1971), silent film actor and comedian
- Danny Lockin (1943–1970), actor and dancer, Hello, Dolly!
- Pierce Lyden (1908–1998), actor
- Gordon MacRae (1921–1986), actor and singer, Oklahoma!, Carousel
- Dorothy McGuire (1916–2001), Oscar-nominated actress, Gentleman's Agreement, Friendly Persuasion, Old Yeller

N–Z

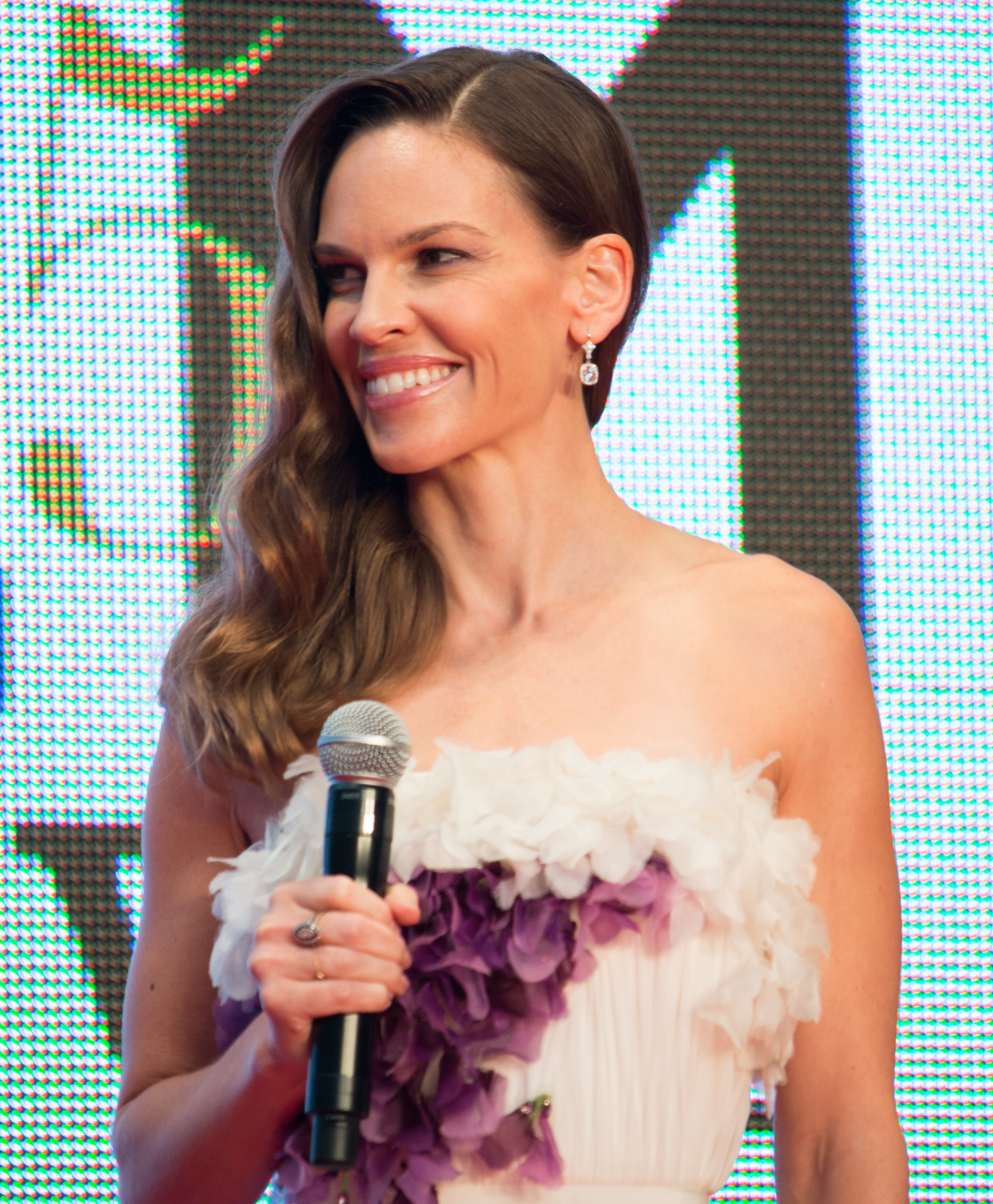
Hilary Swank

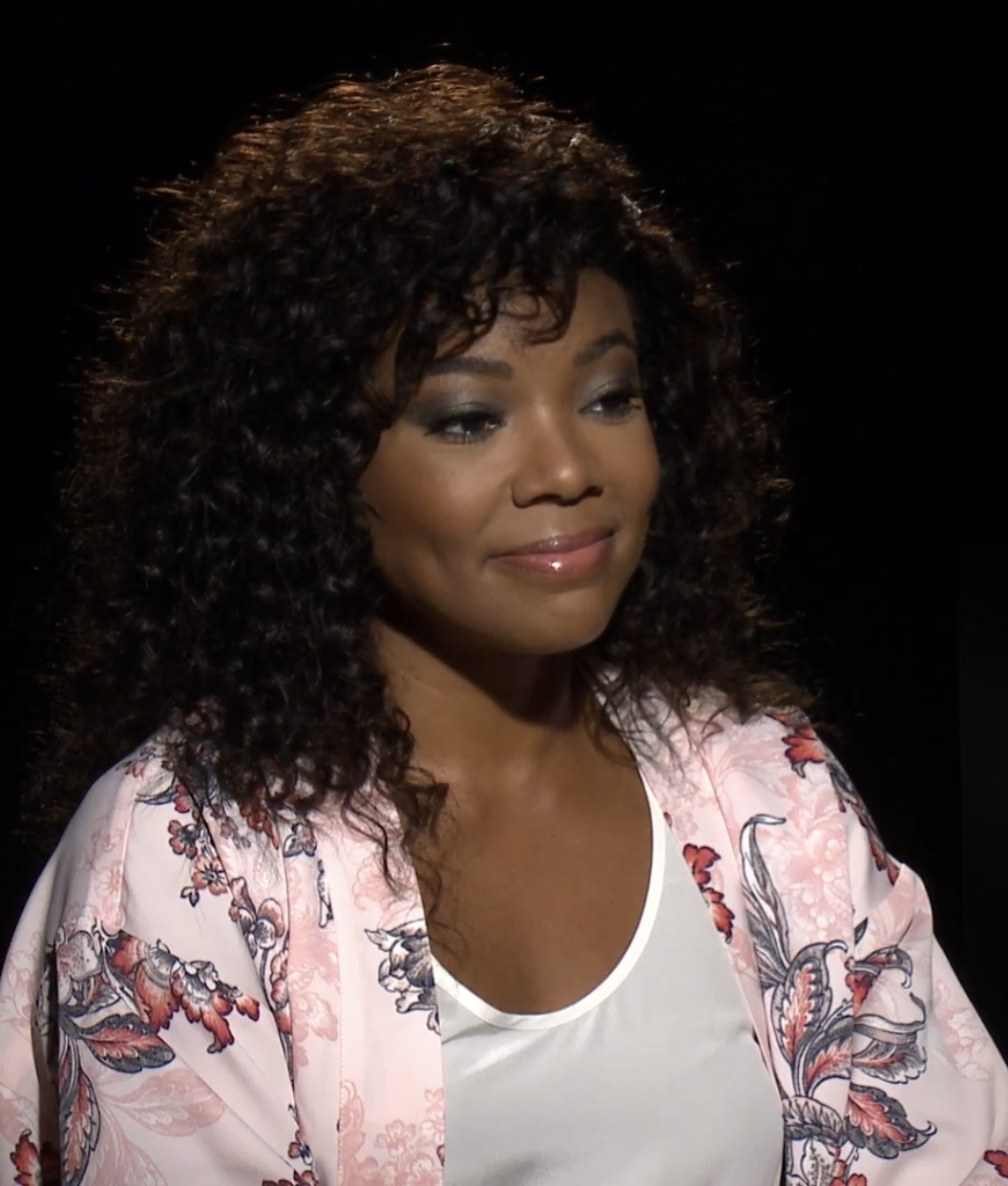
Gabrielle Union

- Fred Niblo (1874–1948), actor, director, and producer
- Nick Nolte (born 1941), Oscar-nominated actor and producer, 48 Hrs., The Prince of Tides, Cape Fear
- Alexander Payne (born 1961), Oscar-nominated director and screenwriter, Nebraska, The Descendants, Sideways
- Lenka Peterson (1925–2021), actress
- Anne Ramsey (1929–1988), Oscar-nominated actress
- Thurl Ravenscroft (1914–2005), voice actor and singer
- Hilary Swank (born 1974), two-time Academy Award-winning actress, Boys Don't Cry, Million Dollar Baby (born in Lincoln)
- Inga Swenson (born 1932), actress, Benson, Advise and Consent
- Robert Taylor (1911–1969), actor, Ivanhoe, Quo Vadis, Camille
- John Trudell (1946–2015), actor and documentary subject
- Gabrielle Union (born 1973), actress, Bring It On, Bad Boys II (born in Omaha)
- Red Wing (1884–1974), actress
- Irene Worth (1916–2002), Tony Award-winning actress, Nicholas and Alexandra, Lost in Yonkers, Deathtrap
- Darryl F. Zanuck (1902–1979), Hollywood studio mogul, producer and director

=== Comedians and humorists ===
- James Adomian (born 1980), actor and stand-up comedian
- Johnny Carson (1925–2005), comedian
- Ryan Cownie, stand-up comedian
- Adam DeVine (born 1983), actor, comedian, writer, Workaholics
- Godfrey (born 1969), comedian and actor
- Larry the Cable Guy (born 1963), comedian
- Skip Stephenson (1940–1992), comedian and actor
- Roger Welsch (born 1936), author, humorist, and folklorist
- Bob Wiltfong (born 1969), comedian and actor, The Daily Show

=== Television and radio ===
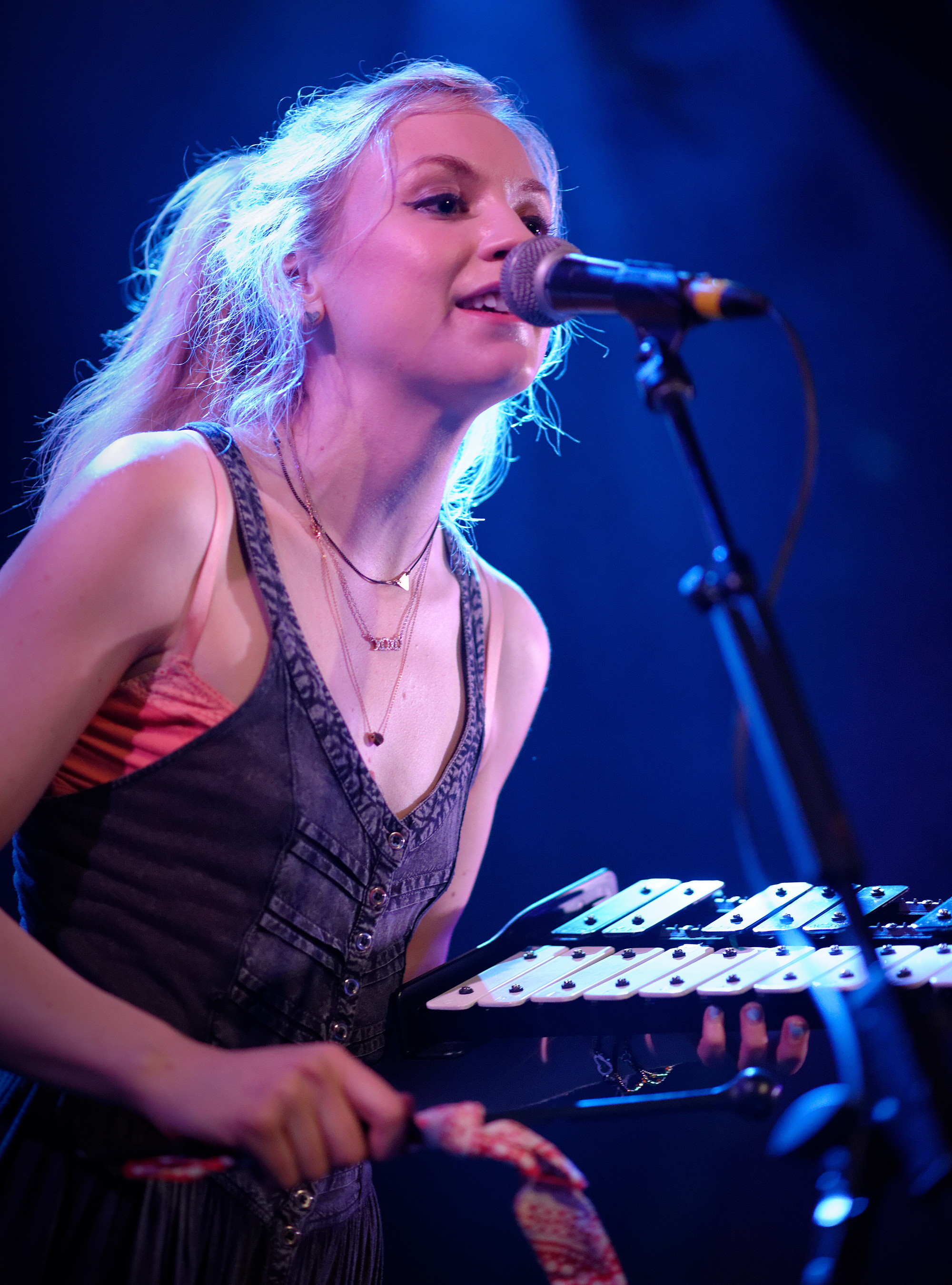
Emily Kinney

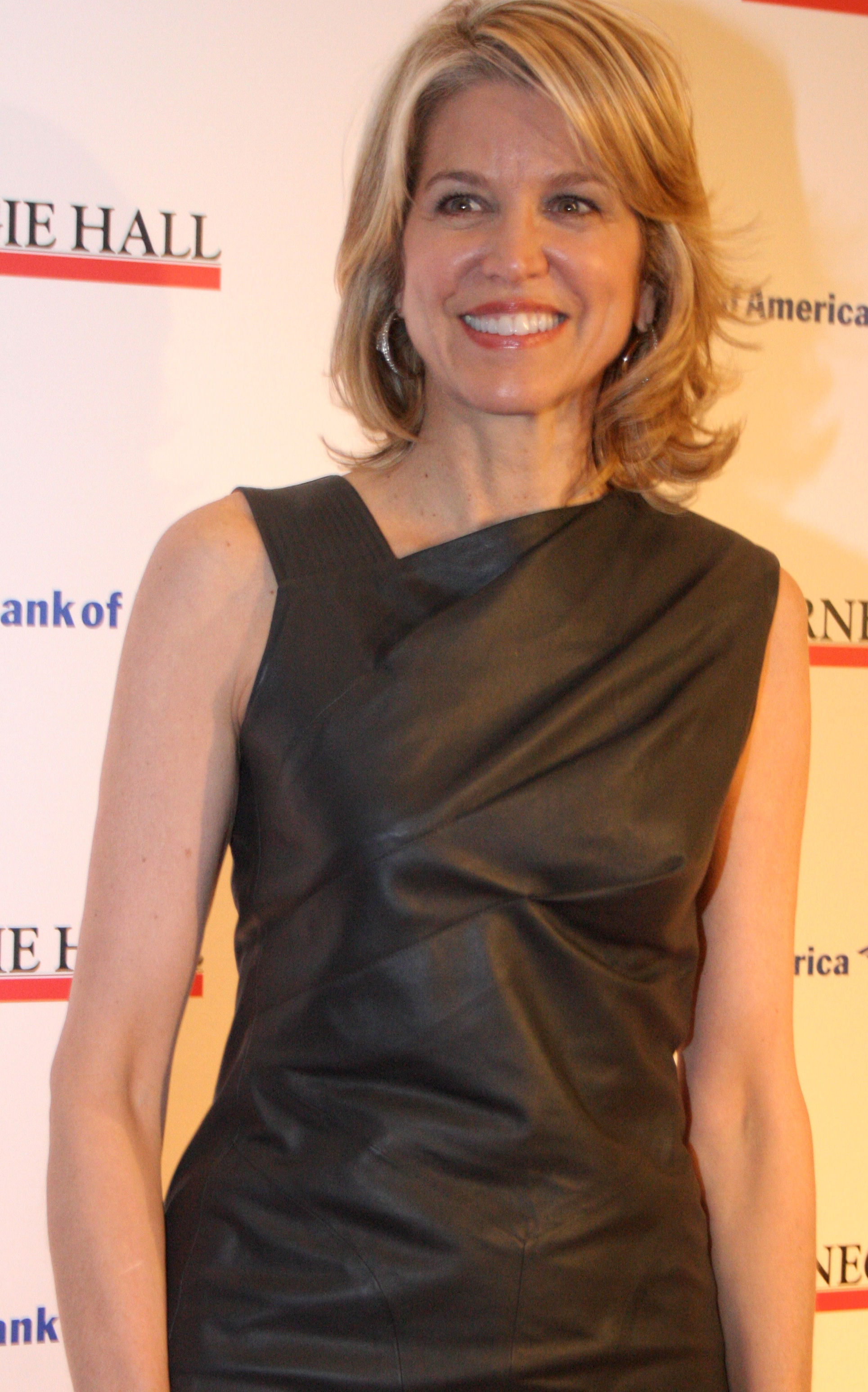
Paula Zahn

- Justin Bruening (born 1979), actor, All My Children, Knight Rider
- Dick Cavett (born 1936), television talk show host
- Abbie Cobb, actress, Suburgatory
- Christopher B. Duncan (born 1964), actor, The Jamie Foxx Show, The District, Aliens in America
- Jim Fitzpatrick (born 1959), actor, All My Children
- Bryan Greenberg (born 1978), actor, musician, One Tree Hill, October Road, How to Make It in America
- Randy J. Goodwin (born 1967), actor and director, The Vampire Diaries, Girlfriends, Grey's Anatomy
- Marg Helgenberger (born 1958), actress, CSI
- Brad William Henke (born 1971), actor, October Road, Nikki, Lost
- Vivi Janiss (1911–1988), theatre, film, and television actress
- David Janssen (1931–1980), actor, The Fugitive
- Floyd Kalber (1924–2004), television journalist and anchorman
- Jay Karnes (born 1963), actor, Det. "Dutch" Wagenbach on The Shield
- Emily Kinney (born 1985), actress, singer, The Walking Dead
- Swoosie Kurtz (born 1944), actress, Sisters, Mike & Molly
- Irish McCalla (1928–2002), actress, Sheena, Queen of the Jungle
- Holt McCallany (born 1964), actor, Lights Out, Freedom, CSI: Miami
- Scott Porter (born 1979), actor, Friday Night Lights, The Good Wife
- Lindsey Shaw (born 1989), child actor for Ned's Declassified School Survival Guide (born in Lincoln)
- Julie Sommars (born 1942), actress, Matlock
- Rebecca Staab (born 1961), actress, former beauty queen, Live Shot
- Janine Turner (born 1962), actress and author, Northern Exposure (born in Lincoln, raised in Texas)
- Lucky Vanous (born 1961), model, actor, Pacific Palisades
- Kim Winona (1930–1978), actress, Brave Eagle
- David Yost (born 1969), actor and producer, Mighty Morphin Power Rangers
- Paula Zahn (born 1956), television journalist

=== Music ===
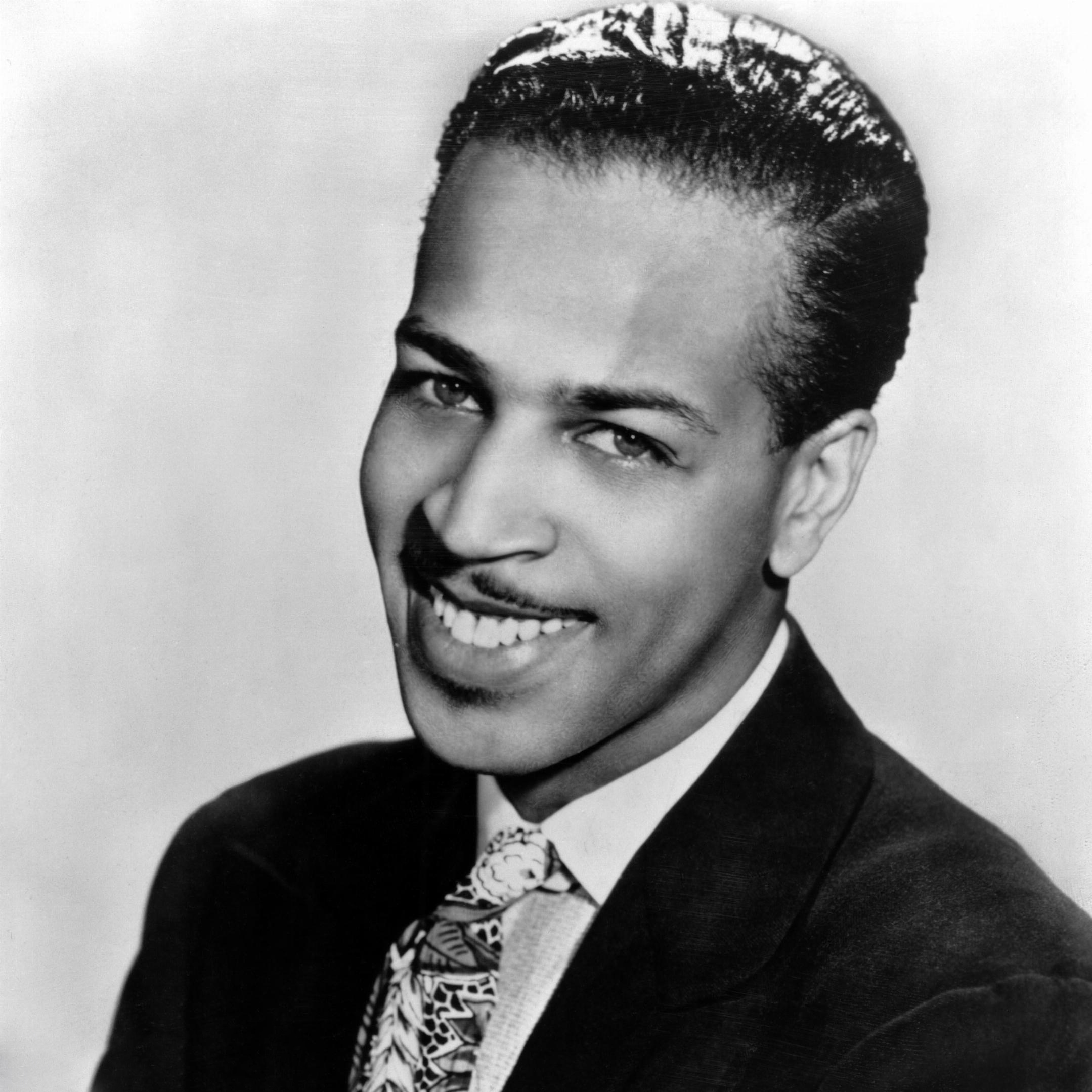
Wynonie Harris

- Kianna Alarid (born 1978), lead singer for band Tilly and the Wall
- Roni Benise, flamenco guitarist
- Chip Davis (born 1947), singer-songwriter, founder of Mannheim Steamroller, and president and CEO of American Gramaphone
- Ruth Etting (1896–1976), singer
- Rick Evans, member of rock duo Zager and Evans, made famous by song "In the Year 2525" in 1969
- Todd Fink (born 1974), member of the band The Faint
- Jack Gilinsky (born 1996), musician, rap artist, part of rap duo Jack & Jack
- Howard Hanson (1896–1981), composer and conductor
- Wynonie "Mr. Blues" Harris (1915–1969), rhythm and blues singer
- Neal Hefti (1922–2008), jazz trumpeter and composer
- Amy Heidemann, member of the band Karmin, graduated from Seward High School in Seward, Nebraska
- Nick Hexum, member of band 311
- Neely Jenkins (born 1974), member of band Tilly and the Wall
- Tim Kasher (born 1976), singer
- Matty Lewis (born 1975), singer, guitarist
- Randy Meisner (born 1946), singer-songwriter, bassist former member of the Eagles and Poco
- Conor Oberst (born 1980), singer-songwriter with Bright Eyes
- Bryan Olesen (born 1973), singer, guitarist of VOTA, former member of Newsboys
- Jamie Pressnall (born 1976), member of band Tilly and the Wall
- Paul Revere (born 1938), born in Harvard, Clay County; musician, teen idol, founder Paul Revere and the Raiders
- Ann Ronell (1906/1908–1993), jazz composer and lyricist
- Josh Rouse (born 1972), singer-songwriter
- Elliott Smith (1969–2003), singer-songwriter
- Ryland Steen (born 1980), Reel Big Fish drummer
- Matthew Sweet (born 1964), rock musician
- John Trudell (1946–2015), poet, performer, musician, leader AKA Graffiti Band
- James Valentine (born 1978), Maroon 5 guitarist
- Paul Williams (born 1940), singer-songwriter
- Roger Williams (1924–2011), pianist
- Denny Zager, member of rock duo Zager and Evans, made famous by song "In the Year 2525" in 1969

=== Other ===
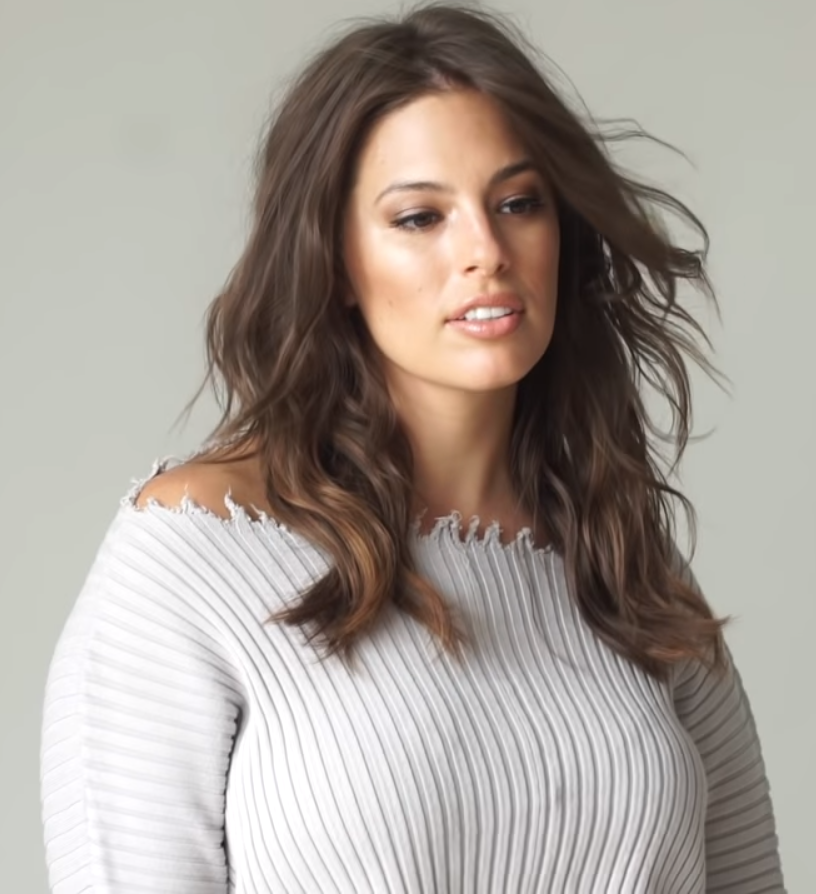
Ashley Graham

- David Phelps Abbott (1863–1934), magician and author
- Lucas Cruikshank (born 1993), maker of internet videos
- Ashley Graham (born 1987), model
- Jaime King (born 1979), model and actress
- Sono Osato (1919–2018), dancer
- JoJo Siwa (born 2003), dancer and singer, Dance Moms
- Sarah Rose Summers (born 1994), model and Miss USA 2018
- Shelton Tappes (born 1911), union and civil rights activist
- Charles Weidman (1901–1975), dancer and choreographer

== Art, literature, and journalism ==
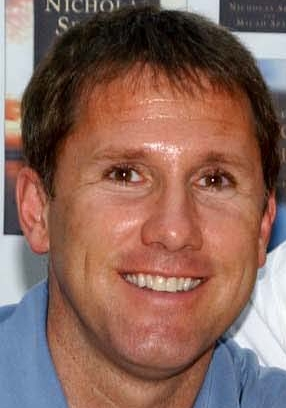
Nicholas Sparks

- Bess Streeter Aldrich (1881–1954), author of 200 short stories and 13 novels including Miss Bishop
- Hartley Burr Alexander (1873–1939), writer, educator, scholar, philosopher, poet, and iconographer
- Kurt Andersen (born 1954), co-founder of Spy Magazine
- Gutzon Borglum (1867–1941), painter, sculptor, designer and engineer of the presidential busts on Mount Rushmore
- Solon Borglum (1869–1922), sculptor, younger brother of Gutzon Borglum
- Jennine Capó Crucet (born 1981), novelist, short story writer, essayist, professor, and cultural critic
- Willa Cather (1873–1947), author
- Raymond Chandler (1888–1959), detective fiction author, The Big Sleep (raised in Plattsmouth)
- Earle D. Chesney (1900–1966), cartoonist
- Mamie Claflin (1867–1929), newspaper editor and publisher
- Ana Marie Cox (born 1972), founder and editor of the political blog Wonkette
- Angel De Cora, painter, illustrator, American Indian advocate, Carlisle Boarding School teacher (1871–1919)
- Loren Eiseley (1907–1977), anthropologist, science writer, ecologist, and poet (born in Lincoln)
- John Philip Falter (1910–1982), artist known for many Saturday Evening Post covers
- Ernest K. Gann (1910–1991), pioneer airline pilot, aviation writer, author of The High and the Mighty
- Roxane Gay (born 1974), feminist writer, professor, editor and commentator
- Terry Goodkind (1948–2020), best-selling fantasy author
- Robert Henri (1865–1929), painter
- M. Miriam Herrera, poet
- Clifton Hillegass (1918–2001), publisher and founder of CliffsNotes
- L. Ron Hubbard (1911–1986), science fiction author and founder of Scientology
- Lew Hunter (born 1935), screenwriter
- Weldon Kees (1914–1955), poet, novelist, and short story writer
- Ted Kooser (born 1939), former Poet Laureate Consultant in Poetry to the Library of Congress; former Poet Laureate of the United States; Pulitzer Prize winner
- Stephen R. Lawhead (born 1950), best-selling author of fantasy and historical fiction
- Christopher Lasch (1932–1994), historian, moralist, and social critic
- Jefferson Machamer (1900–1960), illustrator
- DeBarra Mayo (born 1953), writer and author
- Wright Morris (1910–1998), novelist, photographer, and essayist
- John Neihardt (1881–1973), poet, dubbed the "Poet Laureate of Nebraska and the Plains" by the Nebraska State Legislature in 1921
- Tillie Olsen (1912–2007), author
- Rose O'Neill (1874–1944), illustrator, writer, and creator of the Kewpie doll
- Jean Potts (1910–1999), mystery writer
- Daniel Quinn (1935–2018), author of the philosophical novel Ishmael and its sequels
- Edward Ruscha (born 1937), artist
- Brandon Sanderson (born 1975), best-selling science fiction and fantasy author
- Mari Sandoz (1896–1966), novelist, biographer, lecturer, and teacher; author of Old Jules, Cheyenne Autumn, Slogum House
- Joel Sartore, National Geographic photographer and founder of the Photo Ark
- Dan Schlissel, record producer and label founder (Stand Up! Records, -ismist Recordings)
- Nicholas Sparks (born 1965), author
- Anna Louise Strong (1885–1970), journalist and author
- John Trudell (1946–2015), author

== Business ==
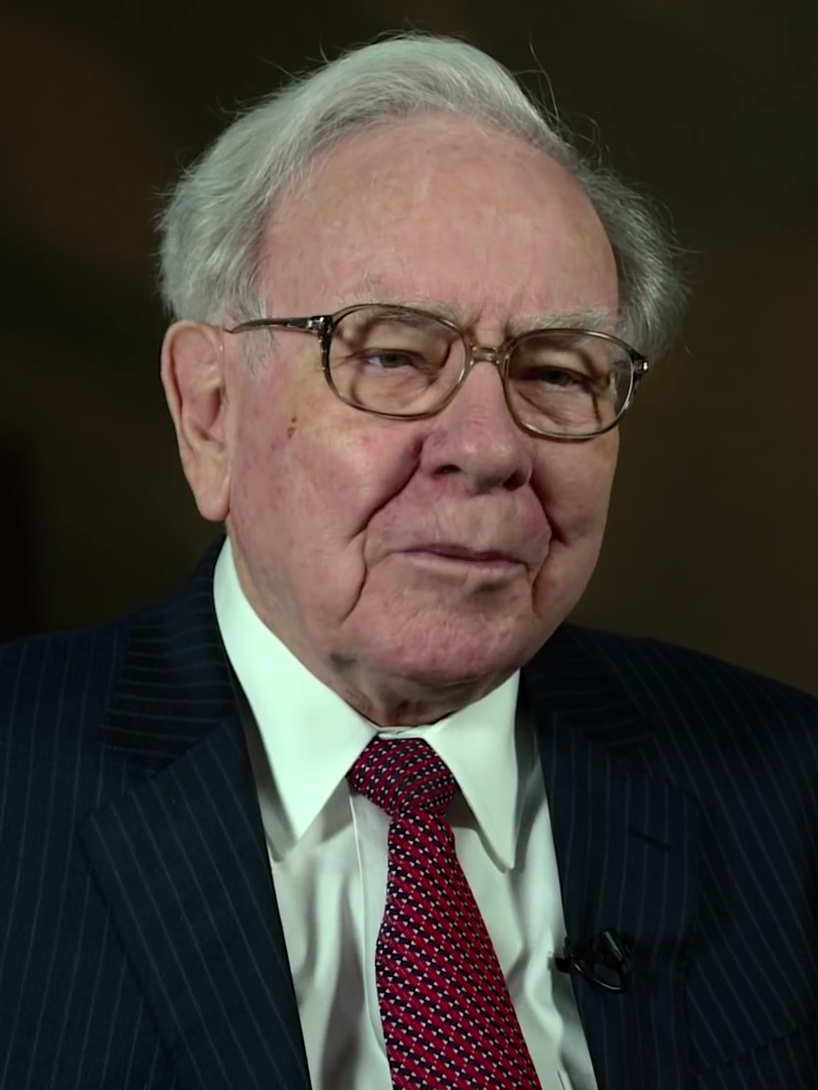
Warren Buffett

- Howard F. Ahmanson Sr. (1906–1968), financier and philanthropist
- Walter Behlen (1905–1994), founder of the Behlen Manufacturing Company in Columbus, Nebraska
- Warren Buffett (born 1930), "Oracle of Omaha", investor; Forbes' 2008 Richest Man in the World
- Richard N. Cabela (1936–2014), entrepreneur, founder of Cabela's sporting goods store
- Paul Endacott, Basketball Hall of Fame inductee (University of Kansas), president of Phillips Petroleum Company
- Joyce Hall (1891–1982), founder of Hallmark Cards
- Mary E. Smith Hayward (1842–1938), businesswoman; honorary president of the Nebraska Equal Suffrage Association
- Andrew Higgins (1886–1952), industrialist and shipbuilder; owner and founder of Higgins Industries; manufacturer of "Higgins boats"
- Peter Kiewit (1900–1979), contractor, investor, and philanthropist
- C. Edward McVaney (1940–2020), founder of JD Edwards
- Zach Nelson (born 1961), CEO of NetSuite (2002–2016)
- William Norris (1911–2006), pioneering CEO of Control Data Corporation
- Edwin Perkins (1889–1961), inventor of Kool-Aid; philanthropist
- Frank Phillips (1873–1950), co-founder of Phillips Petroleum
- Michael J. Saylor (born 1965), founder and CEO of MicroStrategy
- Walter Scott Jr. (born 1931), civil engineer and philanthropist
- Carl A. Swanson (1879–1949), founder of Swanson
- Evan Williams (born 1972), creator of Blogger; CEO of Twitter

== Science and medicine ==
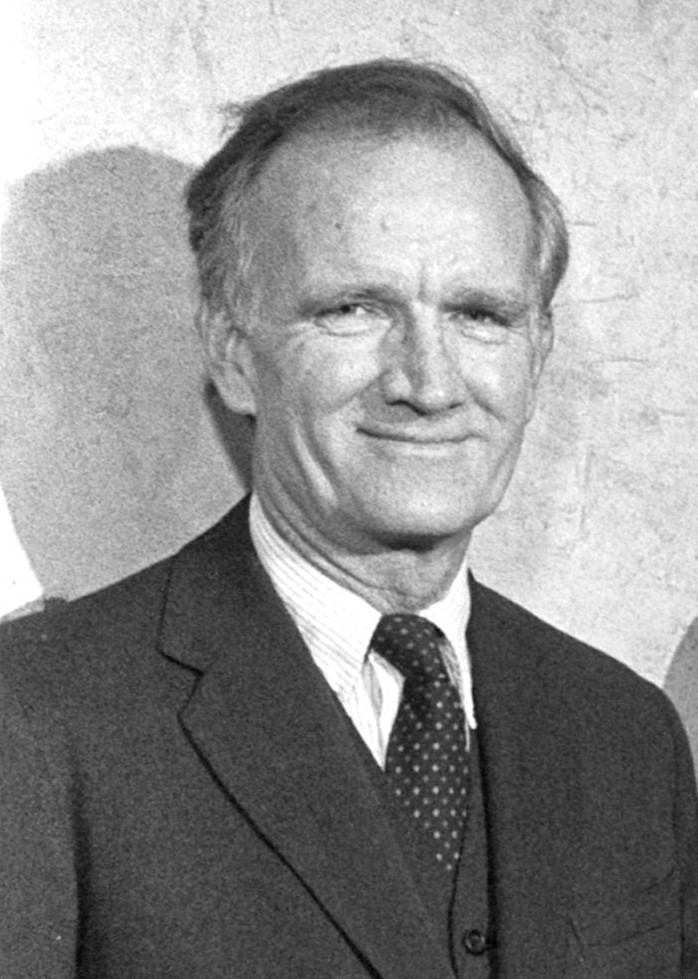
Val Fitch

- Clayton Anderson (born 1959), NASA astronaut assigned to International Space Station Expedition 15
- Nancy Coover Andreasen, neuroscientist and neuropsychiatrist
- Barry Barish (born 1936), Nobel Prize in Physics 2017 for discovery of gravity waves
- Henry Beachell (1906–2006), developer of hybrid rice
- George Wells Beadle (1903–1989), geneticist, 1958 Nobel Prize winner
- Charles Edwin Bessey (1845–1915), botanist, responsible for planting of the Nebraska National Forest
- Leon Douglass (1869–1940), inventor; co–founder of the Victor Talking Machine Company
- John R. Dunning (1907–1975), physicist, played an instrumental role in the development of the atomic bomb
- Harold "Doc" Edgerton (1903–1990), professor at MIT, pioneer in stroboscopic photography
- Rollins A. Emerson (1873–1947), geneticist, pioneer in researching the genetics of maize
- Val Fitch (1923–2015), nuclear physicist, 1980 Nobel Prize winner
- Jay Wright Forrester (1918–2016), pioneer of computer engineering
- Daniel Freeman (1826–1908), homesteader, physician and American Civil War veteran, first person to file for a claim under the Homestead Act of 1862
- Edmund Jaeger (1887–1983), biologist
- Jay Keasling (born 1964), synthetic biology pioneer
- Francis La Flesche (1857–1932), first Native American anthropologist; author
- Susan La Flesche Picotte (1865–1915), first person to receive federal aid for education; first American Indian woman to become a "western medicine" physician in the United States
- Max Mathews (1926–2011), wrote first computer music program
- Victor Mills (1897–1997), chemical engineer, inventor of the modern disposable diaper
- Donald Othmer (1904–1995), chemical engineer
- Joel Stebbins (1878–1966), astronomer
- Ivan Sutherland (born 1938), inventor of the Sketchpad

== Sportspeople ==
A–M

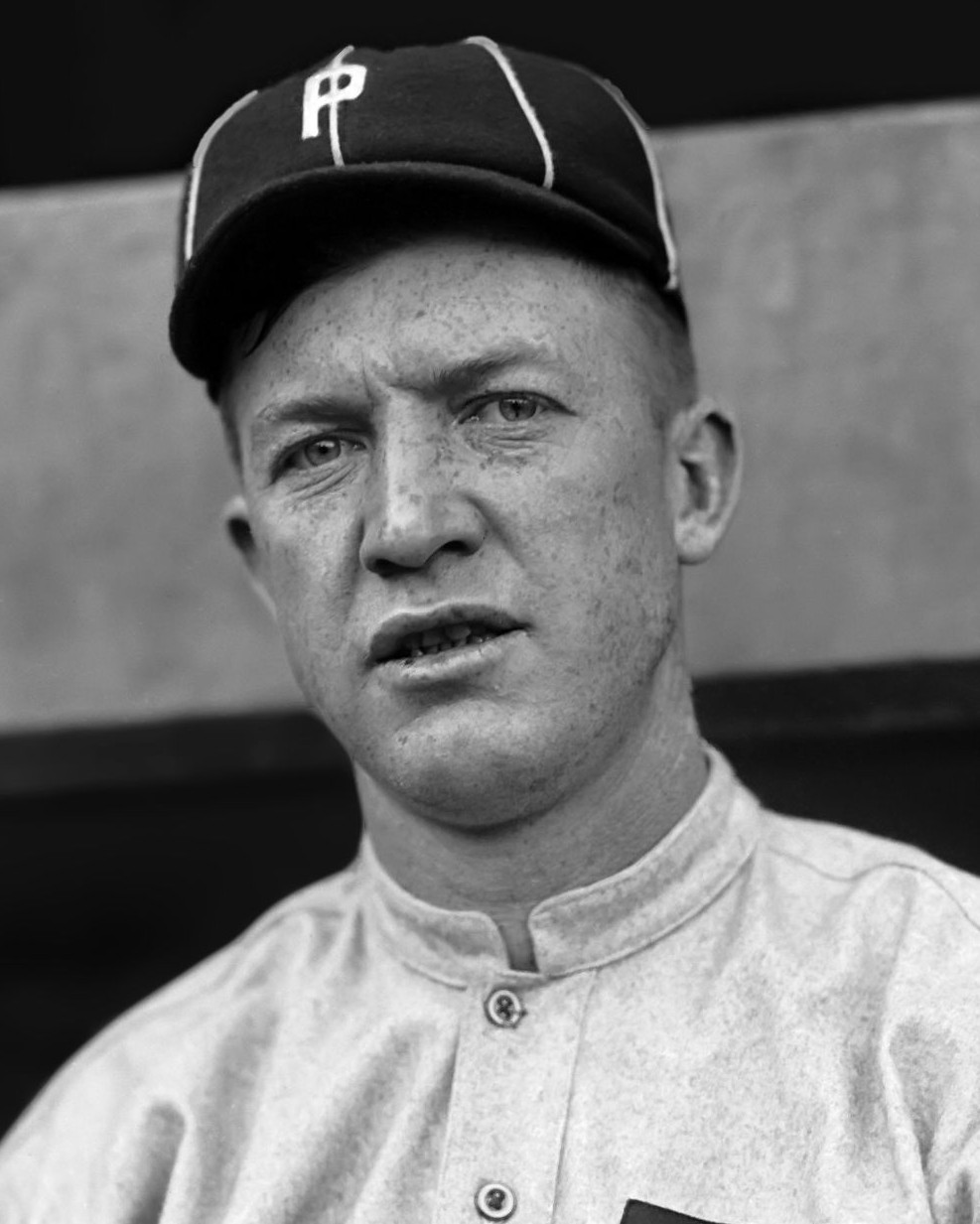
Grover Cleveland Alexander

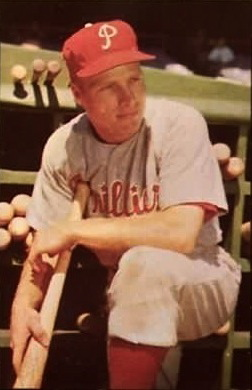
Richie Ashburn

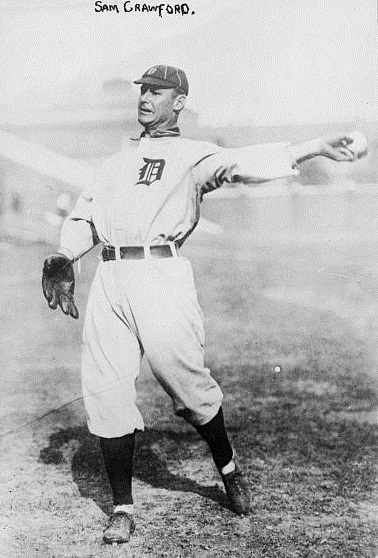
Sam Crawford

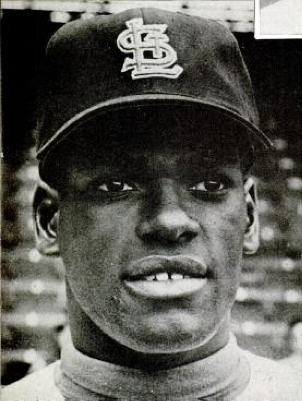
Bob Gibson

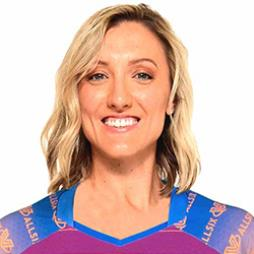
Jordan Larson

- Grover Cleveland Alexander (1887–1950), Baseball Hall of Fame pitcher
- Houston Alexander (born 1972), mixed martial artist
- Barry Alvarez (born 1946), Wisconsin Badgers football coach and athletic director
- Heather Armbrust (born 1977), IFBB professional bodybuilder
- Richie Ashburn (1927–1997), Baseball Hall of Fame center fielder
- Max Baer (1909–1959), former heavyweight boxing champion
- George Baird (1907–2004), 1928 Olympic gold medalist in track and field
- Brad Beckman (1964–1989), professional football player, 1988–1989
- Wade Boggs (born 1958), professional baseball player, 1982–1999; 5x American League batting champion
- Craig Bohl (born 1958), college football coach
- Steve Borden "Sting" (born 1959), professional wrestler for CWA, UWF, NWA, WCW, WWA, TNA, and WWE
- Bob Boozer (1937–2012), NBA All-Star (1968) and Olympian (Rome, 1960)
- Buddy Carlyle (born 1977), professional baseball pitcher from Omaha who played for the MLB, KBO and NPB
- Dan Carpenter (born 1985), placekicker for the Buffalo Bills
- Bob Cerv (1926–2017), professional baseball player, 1951–1962
- Joba Chamberlain (born 1985), professional baseball pitcher for the Detroit Tigers
- Jeromey Clary (born 1983), offensive tackle for the San Diego Chargers
- Sam Crawford (1880–1968), Baseball Hall of Fame, 2x Home run champion (1901, 1908), and 3x AL RBI champion (1910, 1914, 1915)
- Terence Crawford (born 1987), undisputed welterweight champion
- Gene Cronin (born 1933), lineman for 1957 NFL champion Detroit Lions
- Eric Crouch (born 1978), football quarterback, 2001 Heisman Trophy winner
- Brian Deegan (born 1975), motocross racer
- Bob Devaney (1915–1997), football coach of the Nebraska Cornhuskers
- Ted "The Million Dollar Man" DiBiase (born 1954), professional wrestler
- Jake Diekman (born 1987), relief pitcher for the Arizona Diamondbacks
- Brian Duensing (born 1983), relief pitcher for the Minnesota Twins
- Jake Ellenberger (born 1985), UFC fighter
- David Erb (1923–2019), jockey, winner of 1956 Kentucky Derby and Belmont Stakes
- Chad Fleischer (born 1972), Alpine skier who competed in the 1994 and 1998 Winter Olympics
- Rulon Gardner (born 1971), Olympic gold medalist in Greco-Roman wrestling
- Bob Gibson (1935–2020), Baseball Hall of Fame pitcher for the St. Louis Cardinals
- Johnny Goodman (1909–1970), last amateur golfer to win U.S. Open
- Alex Gordon (born 1984), left fielder for the Kansas City Royals
- Ahman Green (born 1977), football player for the Seattle Seahawks, Green Bay Packers, and Houston Texans
- Ira Hanford (1918–2009), jockey
- Ron Hansen (born 1938), professional baseball player for six MLB teams
- Mel Harder (1909–2002), pitcher and manager for the Cleveland Indians
- Alex Henery (born 1987), placekicker for the Philadelphia Eagles
- Opal Hill (1892–1981), golfer and LPGA co-founder
- Russ Hochstein (born 1977), guard for the Denver Broncos
- Jeremy Horn (born 1975), mixed martial arts fighter in the Ultimate Fighting Championship
- Chris Kelsay (born 1979), outside linebacker for the Buffalo Bills
- Lane Kiffin (born 1975), football coach
- Monte Kiffin (born 1940), football coach
- Bill Kinnamon (1919–2011), MLB umpire
- Oliver Kirk (1884–1960), bantamweight and featherweight professional boxer
- Sam Koch (born 1982), punter for Baltimore Ravens
- Jordan Larson (born 1986), volleyball player, Olympic gold medalist
- Manny Lawson (born 1984), outside linebacker for the Buffalo Bills
- Frank Leahy (1908–1973), football player, coach, and College Football Hall of Famer
- Maggie Malone-Hardin (born 1993), javelin thrower
- Sean McDermott (born 1974), Head Coach for the Buffalo Bills
- Zach Miller (born 1984), tight end for the Jacksonville Jaguars
- Clarence Mitchell (1891–1963), professional baseball pitcher
- Carol Moseke (born 1945), discus thrower
- Darrell Mudra (born 1929), college football coach

N–Z

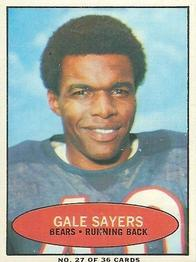
Gale Sayers

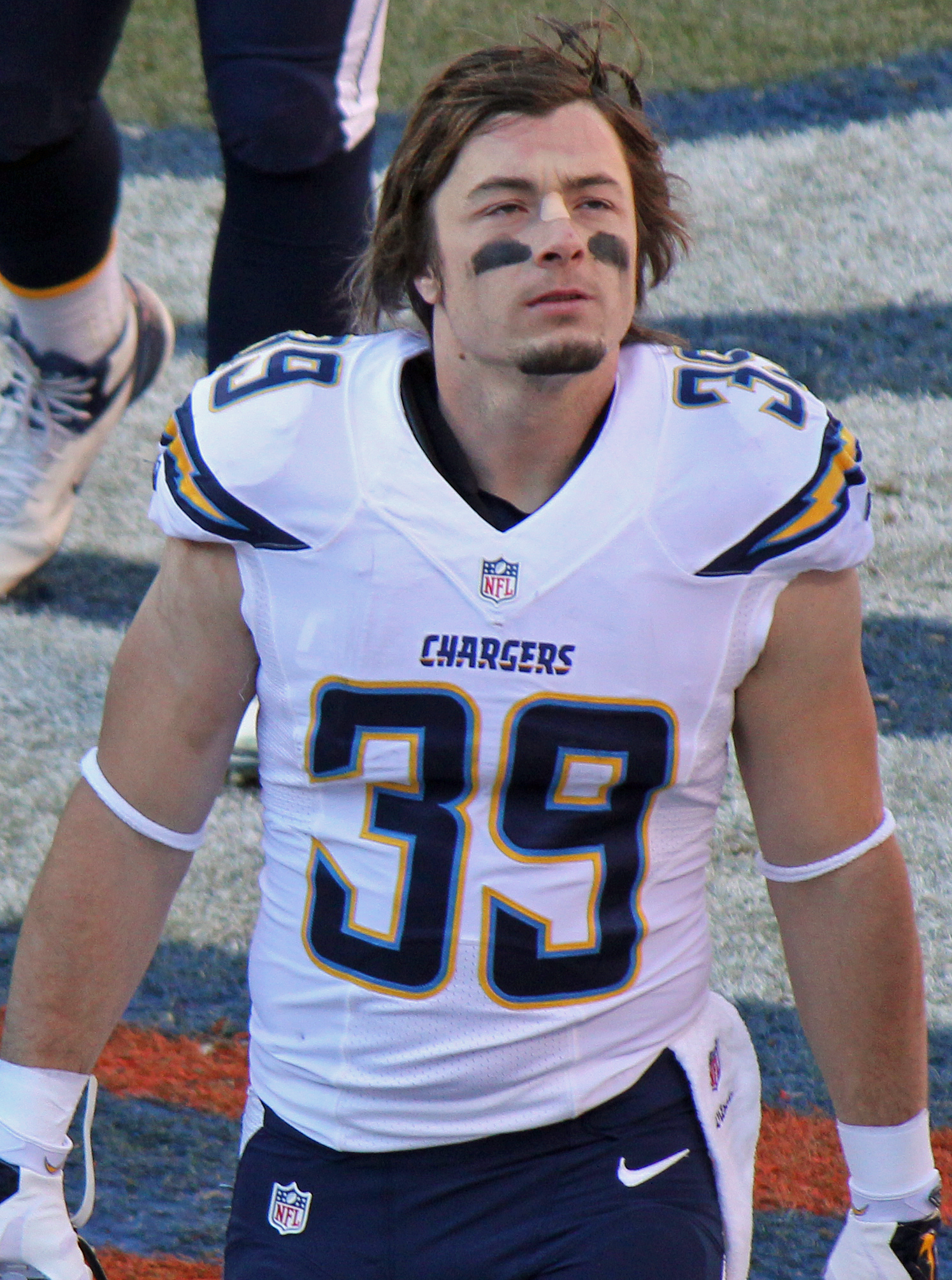
Danny Woodhead

- Gregg Olson (born 1966), MLB pitcher, 1989 Rookie of the Year
- Jed Ortmeyer (born 1978), professional hockey player for the Minnesota Wild
- Tom Osborne (born 1937), former football coach of the Nebraska Cornhuskers
- Justin Patton (born 1997), basketball player for Hapoel Eilat of the Israeli Basketball Premier League, formerly in the NBA
- Zach Potter (born 1986), tight end for the Jacksonville Jaguars
- Ron Prince (born 1969), assistant offensive line coach for the Indianapolis Colts
- James Raschke (born 1940), professional wrestler
- Dave Rimington (born 1960), NFL offensive lineman, two-time Outland Trophy winner
- Andy Roddick (born 1982), tennis star
- Johnny Rodgers (born 1951), football running back, 1972 Heisman Trophy winner
- Lisa Rohde (born 1955), Olympic rower
- Gale Sayers (1943–2020), Pro Football Hall of Fame running back for the Chicago Bears
- Scott Shanle (born 1979), outside linebacker for the New Orleans Saints
- Billy Southworth (1893–1969), manager of two World Series champion St. Louis Cardinals teams
- George Stone (1876–1945), Major League Baseball left fielder; 1906 American League batting champion
- Khyri Thomas (born 1996), basketball player for Maccabi Tel Aviv of the Israeli Basketball Premier League and the EuroLeague
- Curtis Tomasevicz (born 1980), 2006 U.S. Olympic bobsledder and former Nebraska Cornhuskers football player
- Jack Van Berg (1936–2017), Hall of Fame thoroughbred trainer
- Brad Vering (born 1977), Olympic Greco-Roman wrestler in 2004 and 2008
- "Gorgeous George" Wagner (1915–1963), professional wrestler
- Xavier Watts (born 2001) NFL Safety, Ex-Omaha Burke Grad, Ex-Notre Dame football player
- Dan Warthen (born 1952), former MLB pitcher and current pitching coach for the Texas Rangers
- Danny Woodhead (born 1983), running back for the San Diego Chargers, attended Chadron State College
- Jerry Zimmerman (1934–1998), MLB catcher for the Minnesota Twins
- Greg Zuerlein (born 1987), placekicker for the St. Louis Rams

== Fictional characters ==
- "Clara Allen", who owns a ranch near Ogallala, in the miniseries Lonesome Dove, played by Anjelica Huston
- "Ryan Bingham", the Omaha-based principal character from the film Up in the Air, played by George Clooney
- "Tracy Flick" (Reese Witherspoon) and "Jim McAllister" (Matthew Broderick), student and teacher in Omaha suburb from Election
- "Emma Greenway", a woman living in Kearney and hospitalized in Lincoln from the film Terms of Endearment, played by Debra Winger
- "Whitey Marsh" (Mickey Rooney) and other characters in the Omaha-set 1938 film Boys Town, based on a true story
- "Will McAvoy", anchor of the fictional News Night with Will McAvoy, HBO's The Newsroom; portrayed by Jeff Daniels
- "Penny" from The Big Bang Theory television sitcom, played by actress Kaley Cuoco
- "Brock Samson", an OSI agent born in Omaha, on the Adult Swim show The Venture Bros.
- "Warren Schmidt", an insurance agent from Omaha in the film About Schmidt, played by Jack Nicholson
- "Kim Wexler", a lawyer in the television drama Better Call Saul, played by Rhea Seehorn
- Members of the Strategic Air Command based in Omaha in the 1964 film Fail-Safe

== Other ==
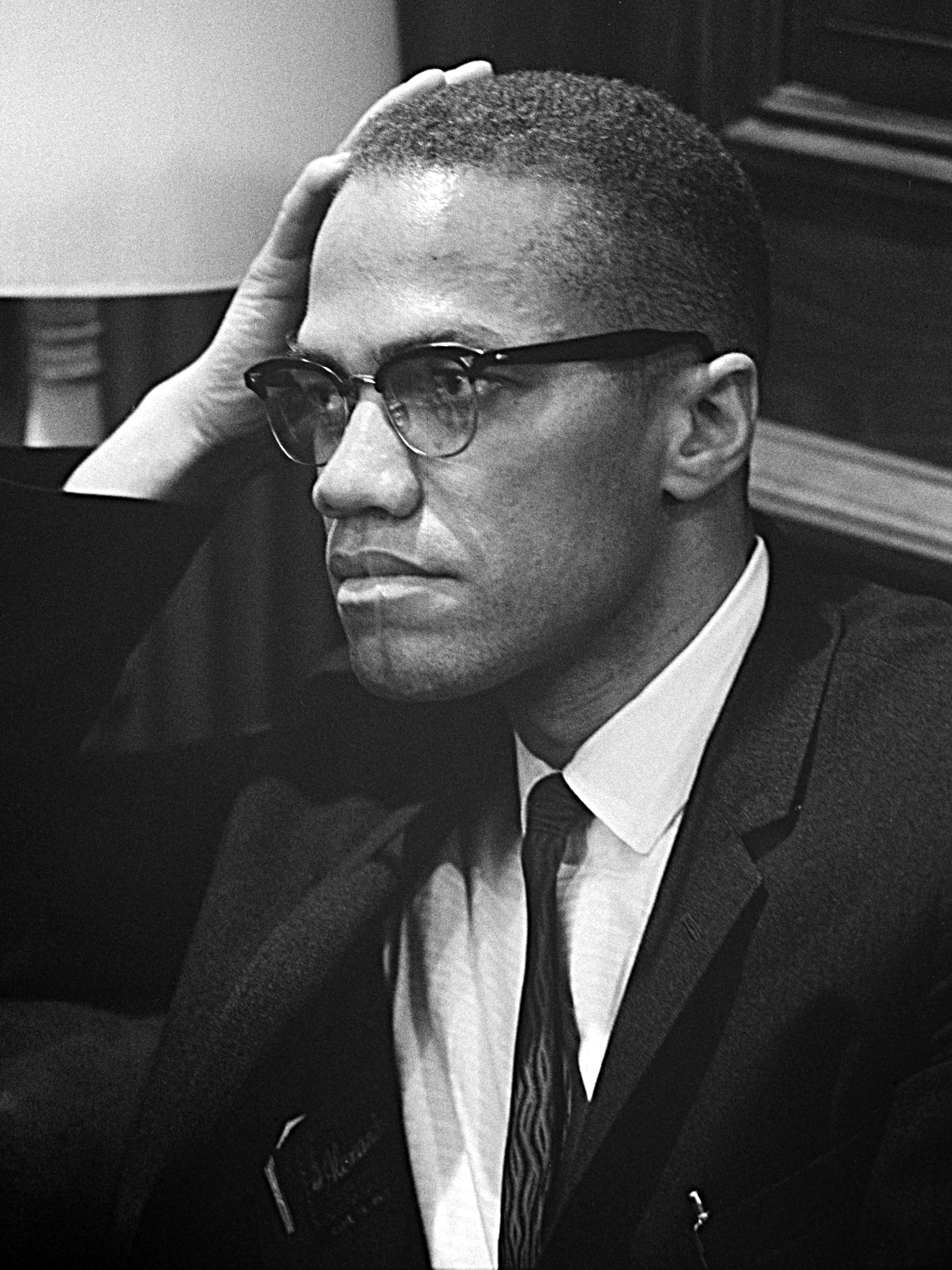
Malcolm X

- Edith Abbott (1876–1957), economist, social worker, educator, and author
- Grace Abbott (1878–1939), social worker and child welfare reformer
- Walter Brueggemann (born 1933), Protestant Old Testament scholar and theologian
- Frank W. Cyr (1900–1995), educator, author, and "father of the yellow school bus"
- Clayton Danks (1879–1970), inspiration of the cowboy on the Wyoming trademark, Bucking Horse and Rider, with the gelding horse Steamboat; born in O'Neill in Holt County, Nebraska
- William Eugene Galbraith (1926–2012), businessman and national commander of The American Legion (1967–68)
- Merle Elwin Hansen (1919–2009), farmer and conservationist
- Carmelita Hinton (1890–1983), progressive educator
- John L. Loos (1918–2011), historian of the Lewis and Clark Expedition
- Malcolm X (1925–1965), civil rights leader
- Roscoe Pound (1870–1964), botanist, lawyer, and law professor and theorist
- Carrie B. Raymond (1857–1927), choral director, University of Nebraska chorus
- Teresa Scanlan (born 1993), Miss America 2011
- Charles Starkweather (1938–1959), spree killer who murdered 11 victims
- Brandon Teena (1972–1993), trans man whose murder was the basis of the movie Boys Don't Cry
- Virginia Lamp Thomas (born 1957), consultant for The Heritage Foundation; wife of Supreme Court Justice Clarence Thomas
- Robert B. Wilson (born 1937), economist
- Caroline M. Clark Woodward (1840–1924), temperance activist

== See also ==
- Lists of Americans
- List of Nebraska state senators
- List of Nebraska suffragists
- Who's Who in Nebraska
