= Barzilai =

Barzilai is a Hebrew surname. Notable people with the surname include:

- Gad Barzilai (born 1958), Israeli professor of law, political science and international studies
- Judah ben Barzilai, 12th century Catalan Talmudist
- Netta Barzilai (born 1993), Israeli singer, recording artist and looping artist
- Nir Barzilai (born 1955), founding director of the Institute for Aging Research
- Salvatore Barzilai (1860–1939), Italian journalist and politician
- Shmuel Barzilai (born 1957), Israeli cantor
- Yisrael Barzilai (1913−1970), Israeli politician and government minister

== See also ==
- Barzilai Medical Center, a 617-bed hospital in Ashkelon, southern Israel
- Joseph Berger-Barzilai (1904–1978), founding member and secretary of the Communist Party of Palestine
- Barzillai, mentioned in the Old Testament
- Barzali
- Barzilay
