= Mary Smith Hayward =

American businesswoman (1842–1938)

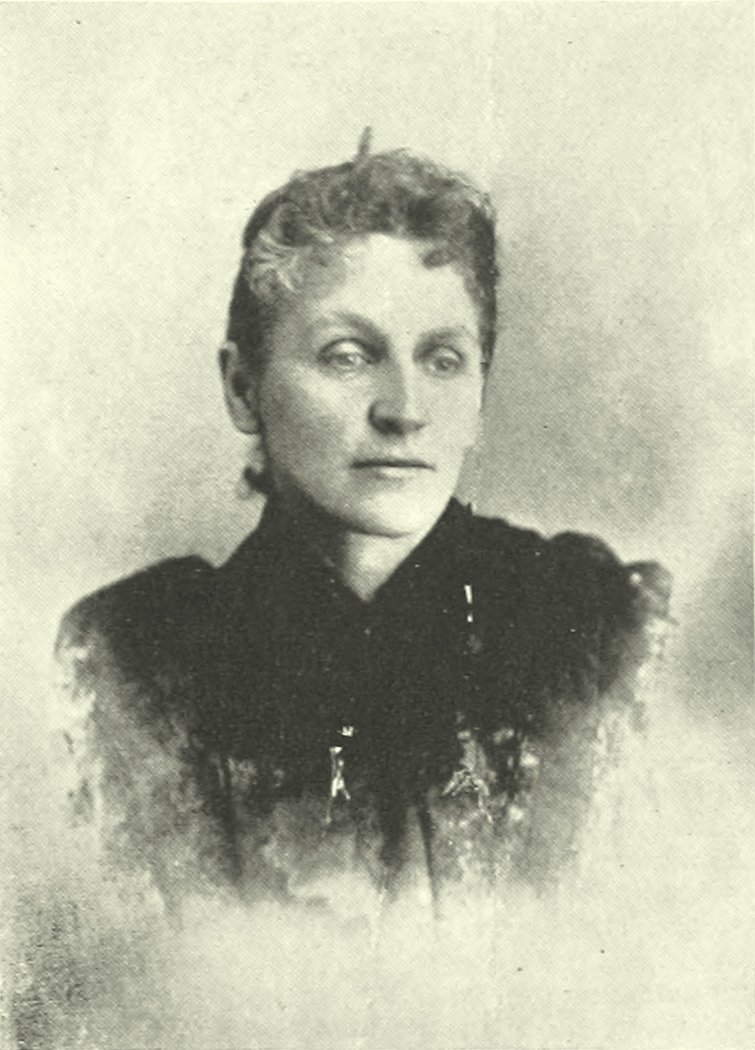
- Born: Mary Eliza Smith; July 9, 1842; Liberty Township, Susquehanna County, Pennsylvania, U.S.
- Died: February 7, 1938 (aged 95); Chadron, Nebraska, U.S.
- Other names: Sometimes, Mary E. Smith-Hayward
- Occupation: Businesswoman
- Years active: 50
- Spouse: William Francis Hayward (m. 1888; died 1910)

Mary Eliza Hayward (née Smith; July 9, 1842 – February 7, 1938) was an American businesswoman, the first businesswoman of Chadron, Nebraska. For 50 years, as proprietor of the M. E. Smith & Co. Twin Stores of Chadron, she was a dry goods merchant, one of the very successful businesswomen of the state. For years, she was one of the most prominent woman suffragists of Nebraska, was a State member of the Nebraska Woman Suffrage Association, was honorary president of the Nebraska Equal Suffrage Association, and gave both time and money in generous amounts for the cause of woman suffrage in Nebraska.

== Early life and education ==
Mary Eliza Smith was born in Liberty Township, Susquehanna County, Pennsylvania, July 9, 1842. (Note: According to the records of the "United States Census, 1850", Mary was already seven by 1850. According to Allen (2001), Mary was born in 1842. According to Willard & Livermore (1893) Mary was born in Franklin, Venango County, Pennsylvania, July 9, 1849. According to Reeves (1916), Mary was born in Franklin, Pennsylvania, in 1858.) She was the eldest of four children born to Andrew L. and Phoebe E. (Law) Smith. Hayward had two sisters, Nellie and Sarah. The father followed agricultural pursuits in Pennsylvania during his entire life. The parents were members of the Presbyterian church and the children were reared in this religious body. When she was twelve years old, her father died.

She was educated in the public schools after which she attended a boarding school for young women. She completed the high school course at Great Bend, Pennsylvania. While books were not plentiful or easily distributed, there were well-patronized public libraries where she read stories of the west and was particularly interested in a volume called Western Life.

== Career ==
=== Business ===
After a season of teaching, Hayward entered into the oil and mercantile business. Circumstances then occurred which found Hayward on a railroad train bound for the western states of which she had read and thought so much, but of which she later discovered, she knew very little. Her objective point when she left home, was the Pacific coast, her intention being to locate either in Tacoma or Spokane, Washington. She found agreeable traveling acquaintances and that railroad travel was very interesting as far west as the line then went. It ended, however, at Valentine in Cherry County, Nebraska. It was a distinct shock when she reached Gordon in Sheridan County, Nebraska to learn that it was the home of the original "Doc" Middleton, notorious horse thief and outlaw, of whom she had read in Western Life.

By this time, Hayward had decided to locate permanently in Nebraska but Sheridan County did not altogether satisfy her. Rushville, Nebraska at that time consisted of one log house and a tent hotel, and Hay Springs, Nebraska had a single house. She came then to Dawes County and reached what is now Chadron, in April 1885, immediately consulting Benjamin Loewenthall, who had established a clothing store in a tent 3 miles (4.8 km) from the town site. After necessary preliminaries. Hayward pre-emptied land 25 miles (40 km) west of Chadron, and by September of that year, had established herself in a business way at Chadron. During the first summer, she raised all the vegetables she needed on her homestead. Earlier, she went to Box Butte County and filed on a timber claim.

When Hayward went into the general mercantile business, she established the firm name of M. E. Smith & Co., which she maintained ever since. She began in a small way, carefully watching the tastes of her customers before laying in a heavy stock, and in order to be accommodating, kept her store open in the evenings and on Sundays. She went on to carry the largest stock of general merchandise in Chadron, and gave employment and paid high wages to 20 people at the two general merchandise stores she ran. Hayward retired from business life in 1929.

=== Suffrage ===
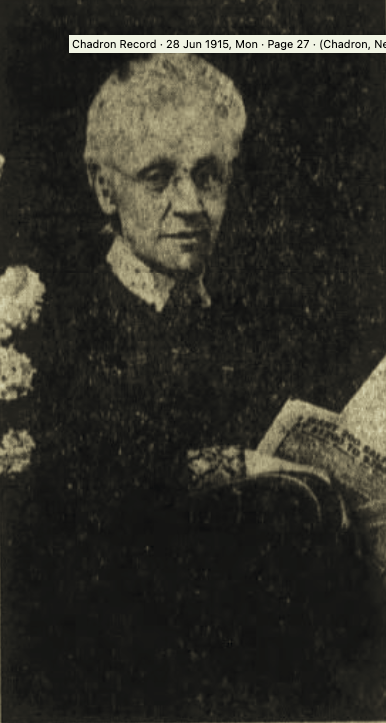
1915

Though immersed in business for many years, Hayward also took an active and interested part in all that concerned the advancement of women, politically and socially. She was a leading member of the Woman's Suffrage Club at Chadron, which she helped to organize, and was president of the Suffrage organization in Nebraska, working hard for legislative recognition. In 1914, Hayward was the oldest delegate at the Nebraska Woman Suffrage convention. She was honored that year for being the most successful suffrage campaigner in the state. She also traveled farther than any other delegate to the convention. She was a life member of the National-American Woman Suffrage Association.

== Personal life ==
On January 26, 1888, (Note: According to Willard & Livermore (1893), the marriage occurred on December 29, 1887.) she married William Francis Hayward (1860-1910), who had come to this county in 1886, and homesteaded 5 miles (8.0 km) west of Chadron. William was a prominent man in the Populist Party, served one term as mayor of Chadron and one term as treasurer of Dawes County and was one of the organizers of the lodge of Odd Fellows.

She was consistently charitable and gave substantial encouragement to many moral movements in Chadron. During the life of the Business Men's and the Commercial clubs, she was a working member and in that way, did much to assist in the development of the city. She established Chadron's first ladies rest room. She belonged to the order of Ladies of the Maccabees.

Hayward was identified with all humane work and reforms. She was strongly humanitarian and supported the work of the Humane Societies, being a life member of the American Society for the Prevention of Cruelty to Animals. Tender towards animal life, though her business included a large millinery department, she never sold a bird or wing. She was vegetarian and adhered rigidly to a vegetarian diet.

In her religious views, she was a Rationalist and an agnostic. She believed the church was responsible for the subservient condition of women.

== Death and legacy ==
Mary E. Smith Hayward died at Chadron, Nebraska, February 7, 1938. She was buried in that city's Greenwood Cemetery.

Chadron's public park by the courthouse was Hayward's gift. In 1909, the women of the town put a fountain there and dedicated it to Hayward. A square on the north side of the Chadron's new courthouse was dedicated to Hayward in 1998.
