= Mary Tenney Gray =

American editorial writer, clubwoman, and philanthropist

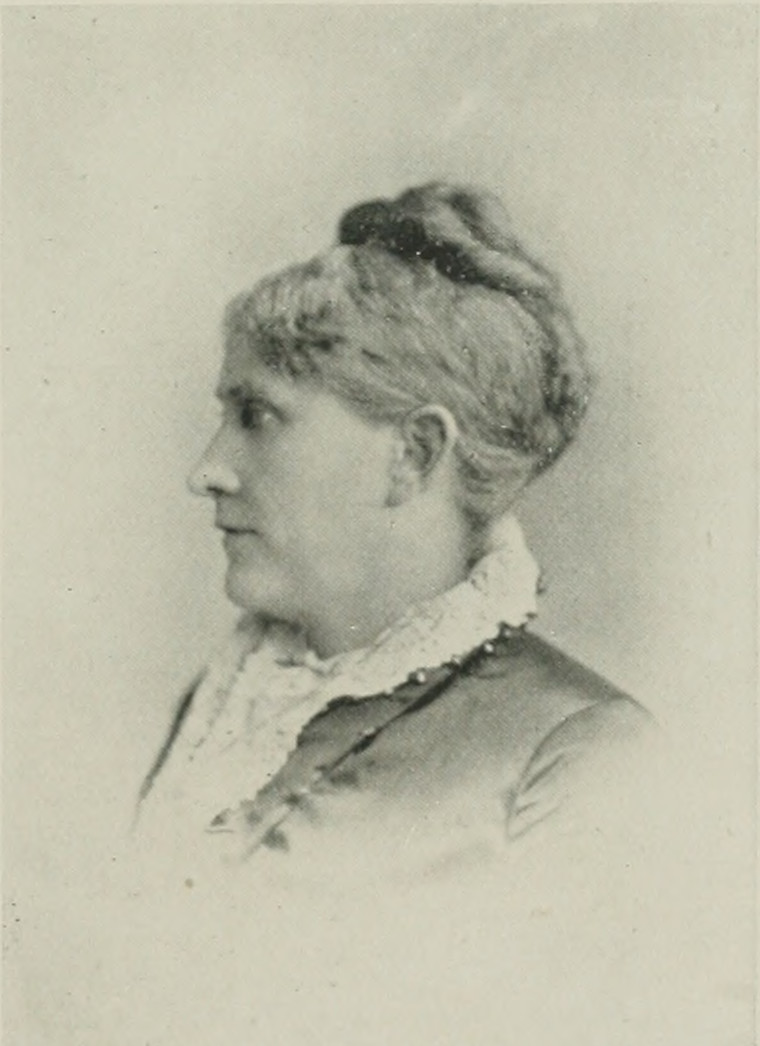
- Photo in A Woman of the Century
- Born: Mary Davy Tenney; June 19, 1833; Liberty Township, Susquehanna County, Pennsylvania
- Died: October 11, 1904 (aged 71); Kansas City, Kansas
- Resting place: Oak Grove cemetery, Kansas City, Kansas
- Education: Ingalls Seminary
- Occupations: editorial writer, clubwoman, philanthropist, and suffragette
- Spouse: Barzillai Gray (m. 1859)
- Writing career
- Notable works: "Women and Kansas City's Development"

Mary Davy Tenney Gray (née Tenney; June 19, 1833 – October 11, 1904; known as the "Mother of the Women's Club Movement in Kansas") was a 19th-century American editorial writer, clubwoman, philanthropist, and suffragist from Pennsylvania, who later became a resident of Kansas. She lived in Kansas City, Kansas for more than twenty years and during that time, was identified with almost every woman's movement. She served on the editorial staff of several publications including the New York Teacher, the Leavenworth Home Record, and the Kansas Farmer. Gray's paper on "Women and Kansas City's Development" was awarded the first prize in the competition held by the Women's Auxiliary to the Manufacturers' Association of Kansas City, Missouri.

== Early life and education ==
Mary Davy Tenney was born in Brookdale, Liberty Township, Susquehanna County, Pennsylvania, June 19, 1833. She was the daughter of Rev. Ephraim B. and Harriet (Lott).

She received her education in her father's theological library, supplemented by a course of study in the Ingalls Seminary, Binghamton, New York. She graduated at Wyoming Seminary, Pennsylvania, in 1853.

== Career ==
Upon graduation, Gray served as preceptress in Binghamton Academy of Binghamton, New York 1854–58.

On June 14, 1859, in Conklin, New York, she married Judge Barzillai Gray. They moved to Wyandotte, Kansas Territory, a town he founded, He was appointed judge of probate in Leavenworth, Kansas, 1859, judge of the criminal court in 1868; removed to Topeka, Kansas, in 1876, and as private secretary to Gov. Anthony. In Leavenworth, she took part in various activities associated with charities and church extension, as well as the state and county expositions. She lived in Kansas City, Kansas for more than twenty years and during that time, she was identified with almost every woman's movement.

=== Philanthropist and organizer ===
Gray was one of Kansas's prominent leaders during the Centennial Exposition of Philadelphia in 1876. As one of the original founders and first president of the Social Science Club of Kansas and Western Missouri, she gave impetus to intellectual culture in those localities, and she saw the organization grow from a small number to a membership of 500 women of the two States. She is also remembered for scientific and artistic work. In 1859, she attended the Wyandotte constitutional convention with Clarina I. H. Nichols and "Mother Armstrong", attempting to have the vote for women included in the state constitution.

As a leader in the women's clubs for art, education, literary and philanthropic purposes, Gray wielded an influence for culture that was felt not only in her home city but throughout the entire state. In the year 1881, a potential effort was made toward a union of the clubs of the state. Up to this time, the club life of the women of the state had been local and confined to a few cities. At a meeting of prominent women, many of whom were members of Kansas and Missouri clubs, held at Leavenworth, Thursday, May 19, 1881, the State Social Science Club of Kansas and Missouri was organized. This first association of women's clubs in the west, with Gray as its first president, was organized by representative women from Atchison, Lansing, Leavenworth, Olathe, Topeka and Wyandotte in Kansas; Kansas City and St. Joseph in Missouri, and Chicago, Illinois. The preamble to its constitution and by-laws read thus: "The object of this society shall be to promote a better acquaintance among thoughtful women of this section who are most desirous and best able to raise the standard of women's education and attainments, to enlarge their opportunities, and by frequent meeting bring the highest knowledge of each for the benefit of all." The meetings of this association were held in various cities in Kansas, also in Kansas City, Missouri, two meetings being held each year. The programs at these conventions were comprehensive, embracing the departments of art, archeology, domestic economy, education, history, civil government, literature, natural and sanitary science, philanthropy, and reform. Thereafter, Gray was remembered as the "mother of the woman's culture club movement in Kansas".

=== Writer and editor ===
She wrote for various papers and magazines, and aided in starting the Home Record, Home for the Friendless, and Kansas Cook Book (an issue for charity). In 1855—,56-,57 she was one of the editors of the New York Teacher. On the editorial staff of the New York Teacher for two years, Gray's influence was felt among the teachers of the state. She was a contributor or correspondent to the leading magazines and papers of Kansas and to the eastern press. The orphan asylum in Leavenworth was indebted to her written appeals for recognition and assistance. The Home Record, of the same city, was an outgrowth and exponent of her deep and abiding interest in the welfare and elevation of women. The compilation of the Kansas Home Cook Book, for the benefit of the Home for the Friendless, was a source of financial strength to the institution, with more than 10,000 copies sold. As editor of the home department of the Kansas Farmer for some years, she showed both sympathy and interest in a group of people who were largely unable to engage in intellectual pursuits.

Gray was a vigorous writer and a clear reasoner. She read papers before many state gatherings, as well as clubs of the two Kansas Cities. In the spring of 1901, Gray's paper on "Women and Kansas City's Development" was awarded the first prize in the competition held by the Women's Auxiliary to the Manufacturers' Association of Kansas City, Missouri.

== Personal life ==
The couple had three children. Lawrence Tenney Gray (b. 1864), became a lawyer. Daughter Mary Theodosia (1866-1949) married Job Harriman, the candidate for vice president at the 1904 election on the Socialist Party of America ticket. Jessie M. (b. ca. 1863) was another daughter.

== Death and legacy ==
Gray died on October 11, 1904, at her home on the Missouri River bluffs north of Kansas City, Kansas. On May 9, 1909, the Kansas Federation of Women's Clubs dedicated a monument in Oak Grove Cemetery, Kansas City, to the memory of Gray, as one of the founders of that organization. The monument is of Vermont granite and overlooks the Missouri valley, which Gray once declared was "the most beautiful and romantic view in America."
