= Barzilay =

Barzilay is a surname. Notable people with the surname include:

- Judith Barzilay (born 1944), American judge
- Dvorah Barzilay-Yegar (born 1933), Israeli historian
- Regina Barzilay (born 1971), professor at the Massachusetts Institute of Technology
