= Killing of Raymond Yellow Thunder =

Death of Raymond Yellow Thunder

Raymond Yellow Thunder
- Born: January 1, 1921; Kyle, South Dakota, United States
- Died: February 13, 1972 (aged 51); Gordon, Nebraska, United States
- Citizenship: Oglala Lakota
- Spouse: Dora Cutgrass (ex-wife)
- Relatives: Chief American Horse (grandfather)

Raymond Yellow Thunder (January 1, 1921 – February 13, 1972) was an Oglala Lakota man, born in Kyle, South Dakota, on the Pine Ridge Indian Reservation.

He was killed in Gordon, Nebraska. His death became notable as an example of a racially motivated assault against a Native American, as he was murdered by four white men who had bragged earlier that evening about beating an Indian.

Members of the American Indian Movement went to Gordon in search of justice in the case. The prosecution of his killers aroused much controversy, as the two brothers, convicted of manslaughter, were given light sentences.

== Early life and education ==
Yellow Thunder was one of seven children of Jennie and Andrew Yellow Thunder and the grandson of Chief American Horse. He was noted in his reservation school to be an average student, a good athlete, and the best artist in the school. He was gifted in taming horses, which allowed him to work as a ranch hand in his adult years. The only meat he would eat was chicken.

== Marriage ==
He married Dora Cutgrass when they were young. They divorced and did not have children.

== Career ==
Yellow Thunder eventually pursued work in Gordon as a ranch hand. As an employee, he was "so reliable that Harold Rucker, who employed Yellow Thunder for many years, was immediately alarmed when he wasn't at the appointed spot in Gordon where he picked him up to take him back to the ranch on Sunday evenings."

== Death ==
On February 12, 1972, Yellow Thunder was walking down the street in Gordon. The brothers Les and Pat Hare along with friends Bernard Lutter, and Robert Bayliss, found him by a used-car lot. The Hares and Bayliss assaulted Yellow Thunder. They had been heard earlier that night talking about "busting an Indian". They stripped Yellow Thunder of his pants and undergarments and shoved him into the trunk of their car. Jeanette Thompson was present, but reportedly did not participate in the assault or kidnapping.

The Hares, Lutter, and Bayliss took Yellow Thunder to the American Legion club. There, they shoved the half-naked Yellow Thunder into the hall, where patrons briefly gawked at the spectacle. Though offered help by employees of the club, Yellow Thunder rejected assistance and left the club alone.

The following day, February 13, 1972, Yellow Thunder was found by George Ghost Dog, an Oglala Lakota boy. Yellow Thunder told him, "I got beat up by some white guys", and Ghost Dog left him.

This was the last time Yellow Thunder was seen alive. It is believed that he took shelter in a car in the used-car lot and died a few days later of his injuries. This is where he was found eight days after Ghost Dog had seen him. The autopsy showed that he had died of subdural hematoma, caused by blunt trauma to his forehead above his right eye.

=== Prosecution ===
Les and Pat Hare, Robert Bayliss, Bernard Lutter, and Jeanette Thompson were arrested as suspects for the death of Yellow Thunder, as numerous witnesses had seen them with the man before his death. The Hares, Bayliss, and Lutter were charged with manslaughter and false imprisonment. Thompson was also charged with false imprisonment. Lutter's charges of manslaughter were eventually dropped in exchange for testimony against the other defendants. All five defendants posted their bail. Thompson's charges were later dropped as the prosecution decided that she did not participate in the crimes.

Upon hearing rumors perpetuated by newspapers and suspicious Indians that Yellow Thunder had been forced to dance naked at the American Legion Club, tortured and castrated before being killed, members of the American Indian Movement entered the case to protest for justice. The AIM vowed to pursue justice and demonstrated in Gordon against the brutalization of Native Americans, with Yellow Thunder's death at the center of the demonstrations. The police conducted a second autopsy, whose results dispelled the rumors of torture and mutilation.

Les and Pat Hare were eventually convicted of manslaughter and sentenced to six years with a $500 fine, and two years with a $500 fine, respectively. Incensed by the meager sentences, the AIM started a protest against the decision. The AIM's involvement in the Yellow Thunder case contributed to its gaining members for a chapter at Pine Ridge Reservation, and led to its involvement in the Wounded Knee Incident, as well as gaining national media attention.

== See also ==
- List of people from Nebraska
- List of people from South Dakota
