= Moshe Yegar =

Israeli diplomat and historian (1930–2025)

- משה יגר
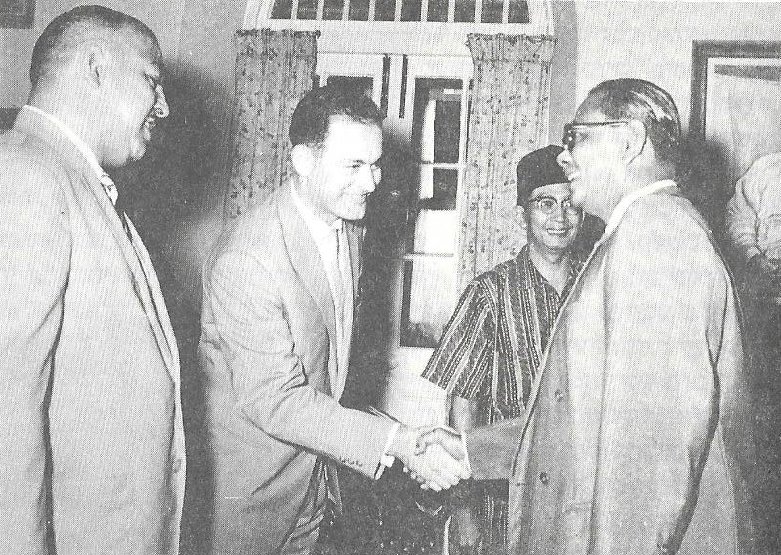
- Yegar (left) shakes hands with Tunku Abdul Rahman in 1960
- Born: 30 October 1930; Buenos Aires, Argentina
- Died: 28 November 2025 (aged 95)
- Education: Hebrew University of Jerusalem (B.A., M.A., Ph.D.)
- Occupations: Diplomat; historian
- Years active: 1956–1995
- Notable work: The Muslims of Burma – A Study of a Minority Group; Islam and Islamic Institutions in British Malaya – Policies and Implementation; Israel in Asia: Selected Essays
- Spouse: Dvorah Barzilay-Yegar
- Children: 2
- Awards: Palacky Gold Medal (1994); M.L. Sondhi Prize for International Politics (2013); Jabotinsky Prize for Literature and Research (2019)

Moshe Yegar (Hebrew: משה יגר; 30 October 1930 – 28 November 2025) was an Israeli diplomat, historian and scholar. He is known for the expertise he possessed on Islam in Southeast Asia and the history of Israel's diplomatic service. Throughout his career, Yegar held various diplomatic positions worldwide and authored numerous works on related topics.

== Early life and education ==
Moshe Yegar was born in Buenos Aires, Argentina on 30 October 1930, to Jacob and Chava Yegar. His father, Jacob Yegar, was an educator and one of the founders of the first Hebrew school in Buenos Aires, named after poet Hayim Nahman Bialik. The Yegar family immigrated to Mandatory Palestine in 1935, settling in Haifa, where Moshe attended the Hebrew Reali School. He pursued Islamic history at the Hebrew University of Jerusalem, obtaining his B.A., M.A., and Ph.D.

== Military service ==
From 1946 to 1948, Yegar was involved in the Hagana, a Jewish paramilitary organization under the British Mandate. After Israel's establishment, he served as an officer in the Israel Defense Forces from 1949 to 1955, reaching the rank of Major.

== Diplomatic career ==
Yegar joined Israel's Ministry of Foreign Affairs in 1956, serving in various roles until his retirement in 1995. His diplomatic postings included assignments in Rangoon (now Yangon), Los Angeles, Philadelphia, New York City, Stockholm, and Prague. In 1965, he was assigned to open a semi-diplomatic presence in Kuala Lumpur, Malaysia, though it closed within a year due to the lack of formal diplomatic relations.

In Jerusalem, he held senior positions within the Ministry of Foreign Affairs, including Head of the Information Department (1975–1978), Deputy Director General and Head of the Division for Information and Communication (1980–1985), and later Deputy Director General overseeing Asia, Africa, and Oceania (1990–1993).

=== India-Israel relations ===
Yegar contributed to the establishment of full diplomatic relations between India and Israel. He documented this process and the negotiations in the *Indian Defence Review*, a journal on foreign policy and national security.

== Academic career and research ==
As an expert on Southeast Asian Islam, Yegar taught a course on the political history of Southeast Asia at the Hebrew University of Jerusalem for nine years. He has authored numerous books and articles on Islam in Southeast Asia and Israel's foreign policy, published in Hebrew and English. His research primarily covers the Muslim communities of Myanmar, the Southern Philippines, and Southern Thailand.

== Public roles ==
In addition to his diplomatic and academic work, Yegar has held public roles as chairman of Beit Agnon in Jerusalem, the Jerusalem Baroque Orchestra, and The Institute for the Translation of Hebrew Literature in Jerusalem.

== Personal life and death ==
Yegar was married to Dr. Dvorah Barzilay-Yegar, a historian who specialized in the life of Dr. Chaim Weizmann, the first President of Israel. The couple had one son and one daughter.

Yegar died on 28 November 2025, at the age of 95.

== Awards and recognitions ==
In 1994, Moshe Yegar was honored with the Palacky Gold Medal by the Czech National Academy of Science in recognition of his extensive research on Islam in Southeast Asia, with a particular focus on the Rohingya community in Burma. This award highlighted his contributions to understanding the region's complex religious and ethnic dynamics.

In 2013, Yegar's efforts in diplomacy were acknowledged when he received the M.L. Sondhi Prize for International Politics from the Institute for Asia and the Pacific for his instrumental role in facilitating diplomatic relations between India and Israel.

In 2019, he was awarded the prestigious Jabotinsky Prize for Literature and Research, further solidifying his reputation as a scholar and a diplomat who has significantly contributed to both academic inquiry and practical diplomacy.

== Selected publications ==
- The Muslims of Burma: A Study of a Minority Group. Wiesbaden: Otto Harrassowitz. 1972.
- Islam and Islamic Institutions in British Malaya – Policies and Implementation. Jerusalem: Magnes Press, Hebrew University of Jerusalem. 1979. ISBN 965-223-310-2.
- Between Integration and Secession: The Muslim Communities of the Southern Philippines, Southern Thailand, and Western Burma/Myanmar. Lanham: Lexington Books. 2002.
- Israel in Asia: Selected Essays. Jerusalem: Yuvalim Press. 2016.
- The Beginning of Israel's Foreign Service (1948–1967). Jerusalem: Carmel Publishing. 2021. ISBN 978-965-7791-12-7.
