= Dvorah Barzilay-Yegar =

Israeli historian

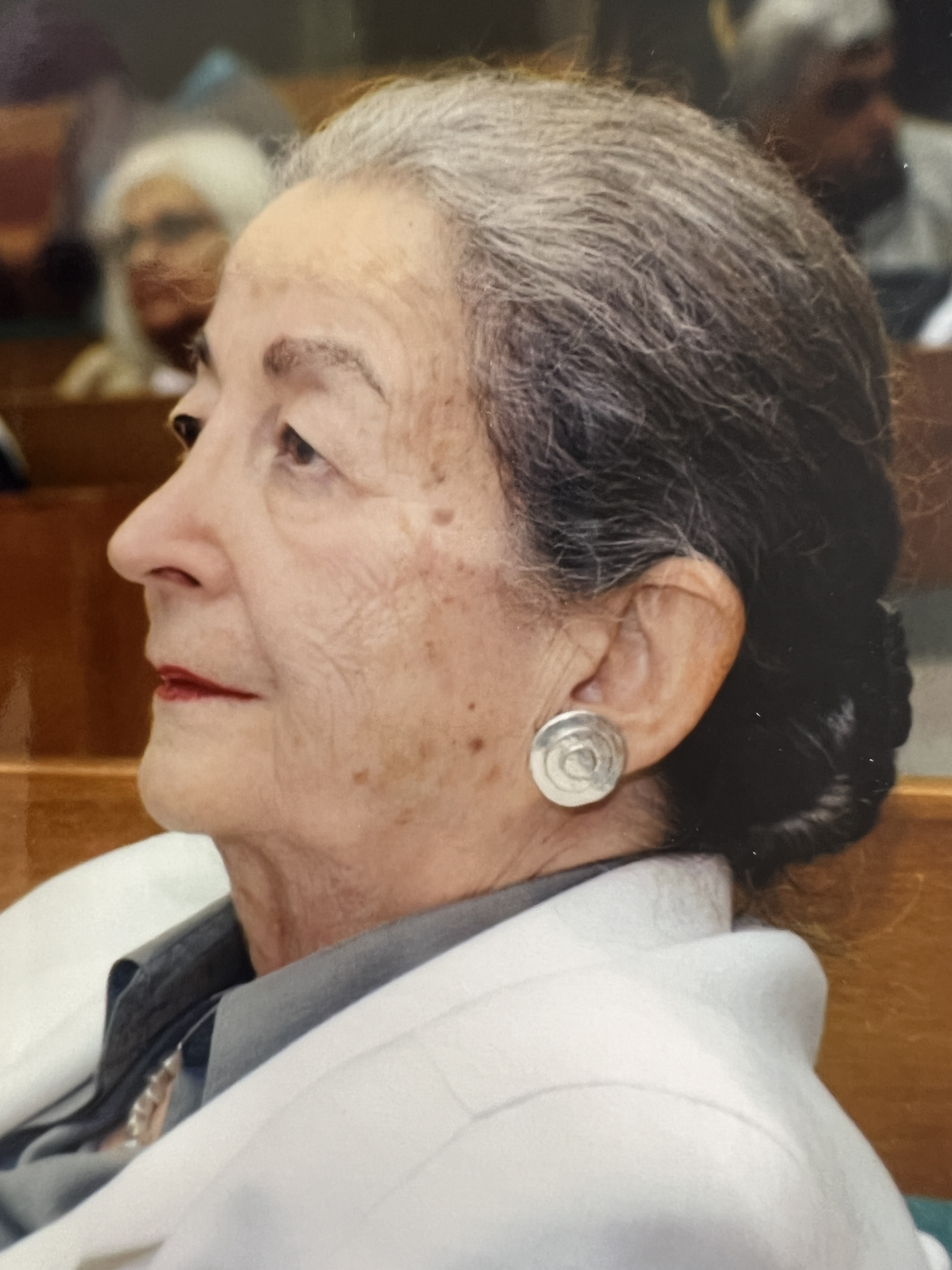
Dvorah Barzilay-Yegar

Dvorah Barzilay-Yegar (Hebrew: דבורה ברזילי-יגר; 1933 – January 11, 2026) was an Israeli historian, who carried out many years of scholarly research into the life and political activities of Chaim Weizmann, the first President of Israel.

== Biography ==
=== Education ===
Barzilay was born in Mostyska, Poland, and immigrated to Palestine with her family in 1936. She grew up in Rehovot, where she had her elementary and secondary education. She obtained her B.A. at the Hebrew University of Jerusalem, in the Faculties of History and Sociology. Barzilay served as a Lieutenant in the Israeli army's Department of History. When discharged, she obtained her M.A. at the Hebrew University in the Faculties of History and Jewish History. Following a period of research in England, she returned to Israel and was granted a Ph.D. Her doctoral work was on "A National Home for the Jewish People – The Concept in British Political Thinking and Policy Making, 1917–1923". At the same time, she studied at the Faculty of Education of the Hebrew University and was granted a Teaching Certificate. She then taught History at the secondary school in Rehovoth from 1958 to 1960.

=== Academic activities ===
From 1961 to 1974, Barzilay was a researcher and research editor on the Editorial Board of Weizmann's Letters and Papers, Jerusalem, and the Weizmann Archives in Rehovoth. From 1966 to 1969, she lived in London, where she was sent by the editorial board of Weizmann's letters and papers, to carry out research and to retrieve material at the British archives about Weizmann's activities during World War I, especially in connection with the Balfour Declaration. She also published articles on this subject. On her return to Israel, she edited Volumes VII and VIII of Weizmann's letters which were later published in Hebrew and English.

From 1974 to 1980, Barzilay was research director and editor of Samuel Tolkowsky's "Zionist Political Diary, London 1915–1919, on the Making of Balfour Declaration" published (in Hebrew) by the Institute of Zionist Research at Tel-Aviv University and the Zionist Library, Jerusalem.

From 1974 to 1985, Barzilay was research director and editor of the survey of archival sources of the history of British Mandate in Palestine, 1914–1948, a project sponsored and financed by the Israel Academy of Sciences and Humanities in Jerusalem, Israel (in collaboration with the British Academy). The results were later produced in a disk.

== Personal ==
In 1979, Dvorah Barzilay married Moshe Yegar, an historian and diplomat in the service of Israel's Foreign Office and eventually joined him on his Foreign Office postings as consul general in New York, and ambassador in Stockholm and Prague. In New York, she taught as adjunct professor at Queens College of the City University of New York, in Sweden she took part in academic conferences and in the Czech Republic she taught as visiting professor at Charles University in Prague and took part in academic conferences.

== Selected publications ==
=== Books ===
- The letters and papers of Chaim Weizmann, Volume VII, 1975, (English), Keter Press, Jerusalem, co-editor; and 1977, (Hebrew), Bialik Institute, Jerusalem, editor
- The letters and papers of Chaim Weizmann, Volume VIII, 1977, (English), Keter Press, Jerusalem, editor; and 1977 Hebrew, Bialik Institute, Jerusalem, editor
- S. Tolkowsky, Zionist Political Diary, London, 1915–1917: On the Making of the Balfour Declaration, 1981,(Hebrew), the Institute of Zionist Research at Tel-Aviv University and "the Zionist Library", Jerusalem, editor
- Jehuda Reinharz, Chaim Weizmann: The Making of a Statesman, 1996, (Hebrew), "The Zionist Library", Jerusalem, translator
- Archival Sources for the History of British Mandate in Palestine, 1914–1948, a database of Documents in Israeli Archives, (English), the Israel Academy of Sciences and Humanities, Jerusalem, 1985, research director and editor
- A National Home for the Jewish People, The concept in British Political Thinking and Policy Making, 1917–1923, by Dvorah Barzilay-Yegar, First published in 2017 by Vallentine Mitchell.
- Co-author with Moshe Yegar, The "Uganda" Crisis in Zionism, Carmel Publishing, Jerusalem, 2020, (In Hebrew)

=== Selected articles ===
- On the Genesis of the Balfour Declaration, Zion, Jerusalem, 1968 (Hebrew)
- Crisis as a Turning Point – Weizmann in World War I, Studies in Zionism, Tel-Aviv, 1982, (English)
- The Zionist Policy of Chaim Weizmann in World War I, Ideology and Zionist Policy, Jerusalem, 1978, (Hebrew)
- The Ormsby Gore Reports from Palestine, April–May 1918, Zionism, Tel-Aviv, 1977, (English)
- Crisis as a Turning Point – Weizmann in World War I, Statesmen in Time of Crisis, Tel-Aviv, 1977, (Hebrew)
