= Gordon, Nebraska =

City in Sheridan County, Nebraska, United States

- City
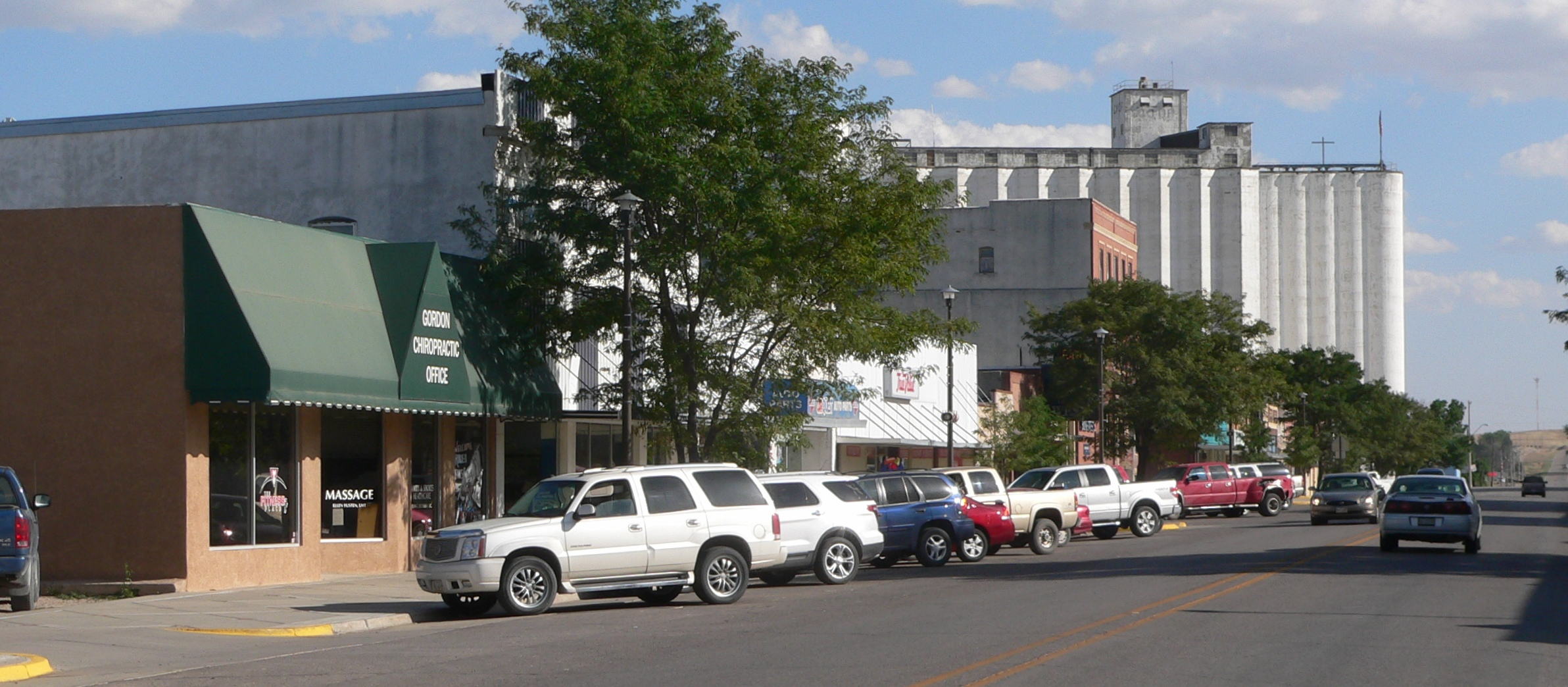
- Downtown Gordon, August 2012

- Flag

- Location within Sheridan County and Nebraska
- Coordinates: 42°48′24″N 102°12′14″W
- Country: United States
- State: Nebraska
- County: Sheridan
- Incorporated: 1885

Area
  - Total: 0.93 sq mi (2.41 km^{2})
  - Land: 0.93 sq mi (2.41 km^{2})
  - Water: 0 sq mi (0.00 km^{2})
- Elevation: 3,557 ft (1,084 m)

Population (2020)
  - Total: 1,504
  - Density: 1,614.7/sq mi (623.44/km^{2})
- Time zone: UTC-7 (Mountain (MST))
  - Summer (DST): UTC-6 (MDT)
- ZIP code: 69343
- Area code: 308
- FIPS code: 31-19350
- GNIS feature ID: 2394933
- Website: gordon-ne.frontdeskgworks.com/c/

Gordon is a city in Sheridan County, Nebraska, United States, in the Great Plains region. As of the 2020 census, Gordon had a population of 1,504.

== History ==
Gordon was incorporated as a village in 1885 when the railroad was extended to that point. It was named for John Gordon, a pioneer settler. Gordon was incorporated in November 1885.

=== Other names ===
In the Lakota language, Gordon is known as tȟáȟča wakpá otȟúŋwahe, meaning "deer river city".

== Demographics ==
Historical population
Census	Pop.	Note	%±
1900	542		—
1910	920		69.7%
1920	1,581		71.8%
1930	1,958		23.8%
1940	1,967		0.5%
1950	2,058		4.6%
1960	2,223		8.0%
1970	2,106		−5.3%
1980	2,167		2.9%
1990	1,803		−16.8%
2000	1,756		−2.6%
2010	1,612		−8.2%
2020	1,504		−6.7%
U.S. Decennial Census

=== 2010 census ===
As of the census of 2010, there were 1,612 people, 685 households, and 420 families living in the city. The population density was 1,733.3 inhabitants per square mile (669.2/km^{2}). There were 806 housing units at an average density of 866.7 per square mile (334.6/km^{2}). The racial makeup of the city was 75.6% White, 0.2% African American, 20.0% Native American, 0.5% Asian, 0.1% Pacific Islander, 0.6% from other races, and 3.0% from two or more races. Hispanic or Latino of any race were 4.2% of the population.

There were 685 households, of which 30.1% had children under the age of 18 living with them, 44.4% were married couples living together, 12.4% had a female householder with no husband present, 4.5% had a male householder with no wife present, and 38.7% were non-families. 36.2% of all households were made up of individuals, and 18% had someone living alone who was 65 years of age or older. The average household size was 2.30 and the average family size was 2.98.

The median age in the city was 42.7 years. 26.4% of residents were under the age of 18; 7.2% were between the ages of 18 and 24; 18.6% were from 25 to 44; 26% were from 45 to 64; and 21.8% were 65 years of age or older. The gender makeup of the city was 47.5% male and 52.5% female.

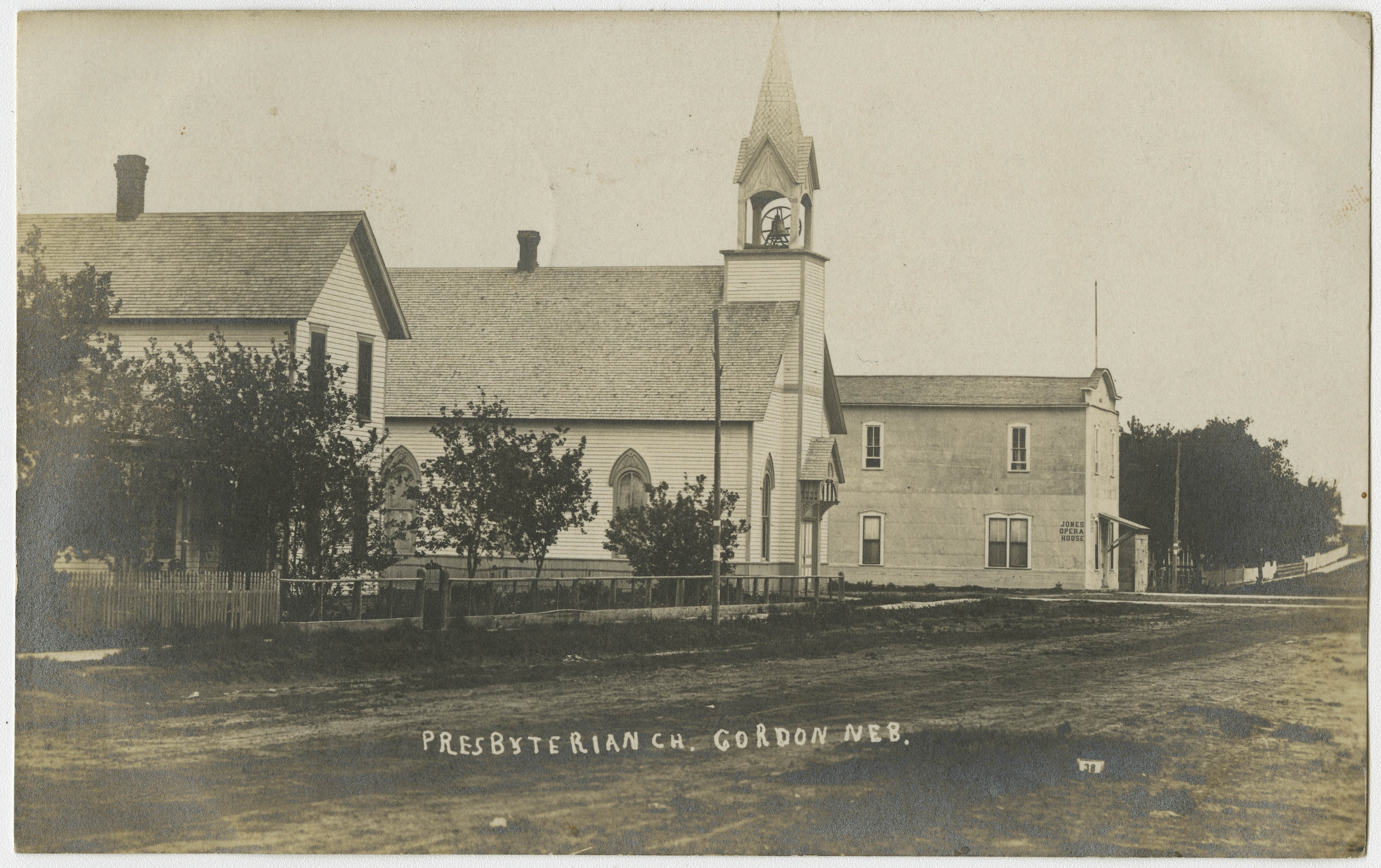
Presbyterian Church on a vintage postcard

=== 2000 census ===
As of the census of 2000, there were 1,756 people, 733 households, and 467 families living in the city. The population density was 1,881.0 inhabitants per square mile (726.3/km^{2}). There were 825 housing units at an average density of 883.7 per square mile (341.2/km^{2}). The racial makeup of the city was 82.35% White, 15.43% Native American, 0.28% Asian, 0.06% Pacific Islander, 0.28% from other races, and 1.59% from two or more races. Hispanic or Latino of any race were 1.65% of the population.

There were 733 households, out of which 29.9% had children under the age of 18 living with them, 48.2% were married couples living together, 12.6% had a female householder with no husband present, and 36.2% were non-families. 33.2% of all households were made up of individuals, and 19.2% had someone living alone who was 65 years of age or older. The average household size was 2.33 and the average family size was 2.97.

In the city, the population was spread out, with 27.4% under the age of 18, 6.7% from 18 to 24, 21.1% from 25 to 44, 21.0% from 45 to 64, and 23.8% who were 65 years of age or older. The median age was 41 years. For every 100 females, there were 84.5 males. For every 100 females age 18 and over, there were 77.3 males.

As of 2000 the median income for a household in the city was $27,896, and the median income for a family was $35,139. Males had a median income of $27,656 versus $16,927 for females. The per capita income for the city was $14,105. About 13.4% of families and 15.6% of the population were below the poverty line, including 24.5% of those under age 18 and 8.0% of those age 65 or over.

== Geography ==
According to the United States Census Bureau, the city has a total area of 0.93 square miles (2.41 km^{2}), all land.

=== Climate ===
Climate data for Gordon 6N, Nebraska (1991–2020 normals, extremes 1909–present)
Month	Jan	Feb	Mar	Apr	May	Jun	Jul	Aug	Sep	Oct	Nov	Dec	Year
Record high °F (°C)	70 (21)	75 (24)	86 (30)	92 (33)	98 (37)	106 (41)	110 (43)	106 (41)	105 (41)	95 (35)	81 (27)	72 (22)	110 (43)
Mean maximum °F (°C)	54.8 (12.7)	58.1 (14.5)	72.9 (22.7)	80.5 (26.9)	88.4 (31.3)	94.2 (34.6)	98.5 (36.9)	98.1 (36.7)	94.2 (34.6)	83.4 (28.6)	69.8 (21.0)	57.7 (14.3)	100.1 (37.8)
Mean daily maximum °F (°C)	34.2 (1.2)	36.6 (2.6)	47.3 (8.5)	56.1 (13.4)	66.4 (19.1)	78.2 (25.7)	86.1 (30.1)	84.8 (29.3)	75.4 (24.1)	59.7 (15.4)	46.1 (7.8)	35.1 (1.7)	58.8 (14.9)
Daily mean °F (°C)	23.6 (−4.7)	25.7 (−3.5)	35.0 (1.7)	43.6 (6.4)	53.9 (12.2)	65.0 (18.3)	72.0 (22.2)	70.5 (21.4)	61.1 (16.2)	46.7 (8.2)	34.2 (1.2)	24.7 (−4.1)	46.3 (7.9)
Mean daily minimum °F (°C)	12.9 (−10.6)	14.7 (−9.6)	22.7 (−5.2)	31.0 (−0.6)	41.3 (5.2)	51.7 (10.9)	57.9 (14.4)	56.2 (13.4)	46.7 (8.2)	33.8 (1.0)	22.3 (−5.4)	14.2 (−9.9)	33.8 (1.0)
Mean minimum °F (°C)	−10.2 (−23.4)	−6.7 (−21.5)	2.6 (−16.3)	16.5 (−8.6)	27.2 (−2.7)	40.8 (4.9)	48.5 (9.2)	45.8 (7.7)	33.0 (0.6)	16.0 (−8.9)	2.4 (−16.4)	−6.9 (−21.6)	−16.1 (−26.7)
Record low °F (°C)	−40 (−40)	−40 (−40)	−31 (−35)	−15 (−26)	12 (−11)	23 (−5)	31 (−1)	27 (−3)	1 (−17)	−11 (−24)	−25 (−32)	−40 (−40)	−40 (−40)
Average precipitation inches (mm)	0.52 (13)	0.62 (16)	1.18 (30)	2.25 (57)	3.24 (82)	3.85 (98)	2.54 (65)	1.80 (46)	1.68 (43)	1.62 (41)	0.70 (18)	0.50 (13)	20.50 (521)
Average snowfall inches (cm)	6.5 (17)	7.3 (19)	8.1 (21)	7.0 (18)	1.7 (4.3)	0.0 (0.0)	0.0 (0.0)	0.0 (0.0)	0.1 (0.25)	2.7 (6.9)	5.8 (15)	6.6 (17)	45.8 (116)
Average precipitation days (≥ 0.01 in)	4.0	4.6	6.0	9.0	10.0	10.7	7.7	6.4	5.4	6.5	4.2	3.8	78.3
Average snowy days (≥ 0.1 in)	3.5	3.6	3.2	2.6	0.3	0.0	0.0	0.0	0.2	1.1	2.6	3.5	20.6
Source: NOAA

== Notable people ==
- Tom Brewer, member of the Nebraska Legislature
- Val Fitch, 1980 winner of the Nobel Prize for Physics
- Dwight Griswold, governor of Nebraska from 1940 to 1946 and editor and publisher of the Gordon Journal from 1922 to 1940
- Trevor Johnson, defensive end in the NFL; played for the New York Jets, New Orleans Saints and St. Louis Rams
- Doc Middleton, outlaw, saloon operator, and deputy sheriff in the late 1800s
- Raymond Yellow Thunder, whose 1972 killing in Gordon led to protests by the American Indian Movement

== See also ==
- List of municipalities in Nebraska
