= Barzali =

Coordinates: 37.1300°N 57.4700°E

Barzali برزلي
- Village
- Interactive map of Barzali
- Country: Iran
- Province: North Khorasan
- County: Shirvan
- Bakhsh: Central
- Rural District: Golian

Population (2006)
  - Total: 277
- Time zone: UTC+3:30 (IRST)
  - Summer (DST): UTC+4:30 (IRDT)

Barzali (Persian: برزلي, also Romanized as Barzalī) is a village in Golian Rural District, in the Central District of Shirvan County, North Khorasan Province, Iran. At the 2006 census, its population was 277, in 75 families.
