= Liberty Township, Susquehanna County, Pennsylvania =

Township in Pennsylvania, United States

- Township
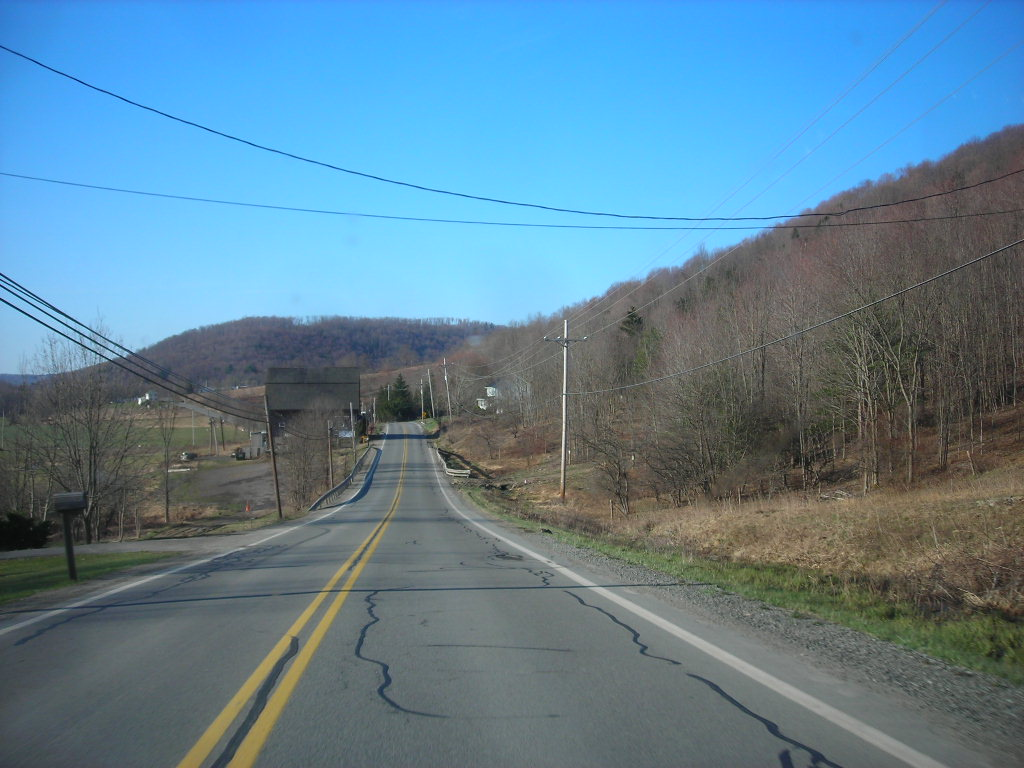
- Southbound PA 29 in the southern part of the township

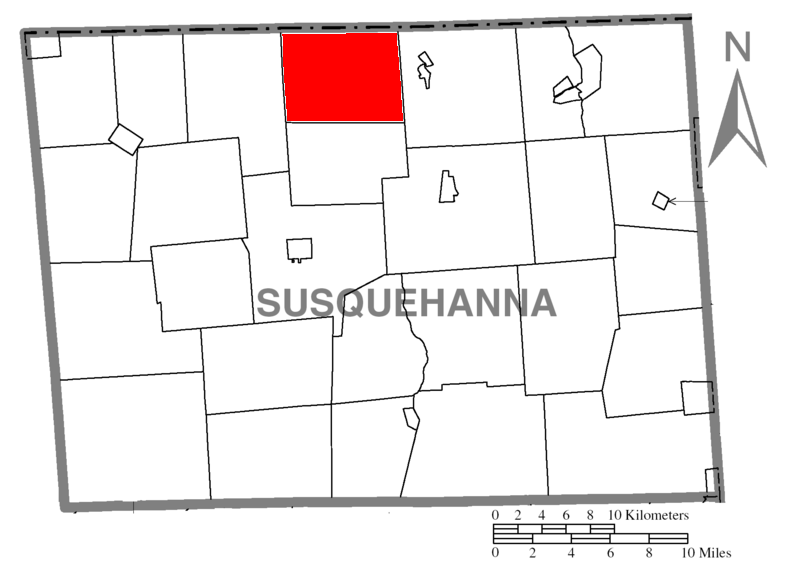

- Location of Pennsylvania in the United States
- Coordinates: 41°58′00″N 75°49′59″W
- Country: United States
- State: Pennsylvania
- County: Susquehanna
- Settled: 1799
- Incorporated: 1798

Area
  - Total: 29.90 sq mi (77.44 km^{2})
  - Land: 29.64 sq mi (76.76 km^{2})
  - Water: 0.26 sq mi (0.67 km^{2})

Population (2020)
  - Total: 1,133 ▼
  - Estimate (2021): 1,131
  - Density: 40.9/sq mi (15.81/km^{2})
- Time zone: UTC-5 (EST)
  - Summer (DST): UTC-4 (EDT)
- Area code: 570
- FIPS code: 42-115-43120
- Website: http://www.libertytownship.us/

Liberty Township is a township in Susquehanna County, Pennsylvania, United States. The population was 1,133 at the 2020 census.

== Geography ==
According to the United States Census Bureau, the township has a total area of 29.86 square miles (77.3 km^{2}), of which 29.6 square miles (77 km^{2}) is land and 0.26 square miles (0.67 km^{2}) (0.87%) is water.

== History ==
Liberty Township was incorporated in January 1798 as Lawsville Township from parts of Tioga Township in what was then the northernmost part of Luzerne County. On September 10, 1836, it was renamed as Liberty Township.

== Demographics ==
Historical population
Census	Pop.	Note	%±
2010	1,292		—
2020	1,133		−12.3%
2021 (est.)	1,131		−0.2%
U.S. Decennial Census

As of the census of 2010, there were 1,292 people, 507 households, and 369 families residing in the township. The population density was 43.6 inhabitants per square mile (16.8/km^{2}). There were 610 housing units at an average density of 20.6/sq mi (8.05/km^{2}). The racial makeup of the township was 97.8% White, 0.5% African American, 0.2% Asian, 0.6% of some other race, and 0.9% from two or more races. Hispanic or Latino of any race were 1.1% of the population.

There were 507 households, out of which 28.6% had children under the age of 18 living with them, 59.6% were married couples living together, 7.7% had a female householder with no husband present, and 27.2% were non-families. 22.5% of all households were made up of individuals, and 8.3% had someone living alone who was 65 years of age or older. The average household size was 2.55 and the average family size was 2.96.

In the township the population was spread out, with 21.7% under the age of 18, 62.1% from 18 to 64, and 16.2% who were 65 years of age or older. The median age was 44.5 years.

The median income for a household in the township was $48,750, and the median income for a family was $46,667. Males had a median income of $40,804 versus $32,656 for females. The per capita income for the township was $23,569. About 8.9% of families and 12.6% of the population were below the poverty line, including 26.5% of those under age 18 and 1.9% of those age 65 or over.

== Notable person ==
- Mary Tenney Gray (1833–1904), editorial writer, clubwoman, philanthropist, and suffragette
