= Shelton Tappes =

American civil rights activist (1911–1991)

Shelton Tappes (March 27, 1911 – April 19, 1991) was an American labor organizer and civil rights activist, known for his role in drafting and negotiating the anti-discrimination clause included in the first contract (May 1941) between Ford Motor Company and the United Auto Workers (UAW.)

== Personal life ==
Shelton Tappes was born March 27, 1911, in Omaha, Nebraska. After finishing high school, he attended the University of Nebraska for one semester, before moving to Detroit with his family.

His wife Louise Tappes was also politically active; the activist Women's Public Affairs Committee of 1000 (WPAC) she co-founded in 1964 included Rosa Parks among its members.

== Career ==
Shelton Tappes began working for the Ford Motor Company in Detroit in 1928, first at their Briggs plant and later at the River Rouge plant. In 1932, Tappes took part in the Ford Hunger March, where unemployed auto workers tried to present a petition to Henry Ford but were dispersed by gunfire from police and Ford's security team; five marchers died from their wounds.

The provisions of this contract shall apply to all employees covered by this agreement, without discrimination on account of race, color, national origin, sex, or creed.

— Shelton Tappes, Ford-UAW contract 1941, clause 78.

From 1937 on, Tappes joined efforts by the Congress of Industrial Organizations (CIO) to unionize Black workers in the Rouge plant for the newly formed United Automobile Workers (UAW). Tappes, who worked in the River Rouge foundry, helped to organize the union's foundry unit and became its first chairman.

These efforts struggled against skepticism in the middle-class Black community of Detroit. Tappes spoke out for the CIO as a "mystery voice" on local radio, and worked with the local chapter of the National Negro Congress to encourage Black leaders to support Ford workers demanding better treatment.

The UAW had a hard time recruiting Black workers at Ford Motor Company (FMC), partly because older community members felt loyalty to Henry Ford, who had hired and paid them well at a time when other auto companies would not. Furthermore, many feared that Black workers were being asked to risk their jobs but would be "pushed aside and ignored" once the union had secured their votes.

After years of often-violent opposition from Ford, on May 21, 1941, FMC employees including most Black workers voted decisively to join the UAW-CIO. The foundry unit headed by Tappes became the UAW's Local 600, at that time "the largest concentration of unionized black workers in the nation."

When the UAW negotiated its first contract with Ford Motor Company, Tappes was a member of the union negotiating team. Clause #78 of that first contract was an anti-discrimination clause that has been described as "important", "then unique", and "the handiwork of Shelton Tappes":

The provisions of this contract shall apply to all employees covered by this agreement, without discrimination on account of race, color, national origin, sex, or creed.

The resulting first Ford-UAW contract, signed on June 20, 1941, was "considered a model and the most liberal of its day." During the 1940s, along with George Crockett and others, Tappes organized a caucus of local activists who agitated for a more prominent role in the labor movement for Black leaders; the caucus is also credited with pressing white union leaders to give greater prominence in their agenda to civil rights issues.

From 1942 to 1944, Tappes served as recording secretary of his local union branch, which had more than 60,000 members. In 1944, after serving three terms as recording secretary, he was defeated in an election. Tappes later told the House Un-American Activities Committee that Communist Party activists in the 50,000-member CIO Ford Local 600 union had warned him in 1942 that he would lose their support if he refused to join the party.

The UAW then hired him as an "authority on contract interpretation and grievance procedure." Tappes compared his job processing discrimination complaints during the 1950s and 60s to working in "a fire station," saying "when the bell rings we run to put out the fire."

Later, Tappes served the UAW as an international representative until, in 1976, he retired.
