= Barzillai Gray =

American judge

Barzillai Gray (October 1, 1824 – December 25, 1918) was an American judge. He graduated at the University of Michigan in 1845, A. B., and was admitted to the bar in 1853. He settled in Wyandotte, Kansas, but later moved to Leavenworth, Kansas, where he was elected judge of the criminal court. In 1876, he was appointed private secretary to Governor George T. Anthony, of Kansas. At the close of Governor Anthony's office, Judge Gray moved once more to Wyandotte, where he held many offices among them that of probate judge. He was, however, best known for his real estate and development plans. He was instrumental in planning several additions and laying out roads and took great interest in the future of that portion of the city known as "Riverview", where an effort was made to establish a market and grain exchange. As territorial attorney for Wyandotte district, Gray was the first man in Kansas to prosecute liquor cases.

== Early years and education ==
Barzillai Gray was born in Broome County, New York, in October 1824. His father was Daniel Gray, of Brunswick, New Jersey, and his mother was Lydia (née Bevie; sometimes spelled Bovier or Bouvier) of Ulster County, New York. His father was a farmer and resided in Broome County, until 1837, when he removed to Marshall, Michigan, where he died in 1840.

Gray spent four years as a clerk in a dry-goods store at Marshall, and in 1845, entered the Freshman class at Ann Arbor, Michigan. His previous education was obtained principally at the Academy at Marshall, but during his clerkship he read Latin and Greek, after business hours in the store, and thus able to enter university, and graduated in 1849.

== Career ==
In the spring of 1852, he went to Binghamton, New York, and was there admitted to the bar. In April 1857, he went to Wyandotte, Kansas, and became the first city attorney. At the election, for state officers, under the Lecompton Constitution, he was elected representative by the Free State party, and after the “ candle box” was unearthed at Lecompton, and the fraudulent vote of “Delaware Crossing” thrown out, he received a certificate of election from John Calhoun.

In 1859, he was elected probate judge of Wyandotte county, to fill the vacancy occasioned by the death of Judge Johnson, P. Sidney Post being the opposing candidate. Gray was reelected in the fall of that year for the full term under the Kansas Territory, and again re-elected under the Kansas state constitution, and held the office until January, 1862, when he resigned and moved to Leavenworth, where he practiced law until 1868. He was then elected judge of the criminal court of Leavenworth county, and held the office four years. He moved to Topeka in January, 1877.

== Personal life ==
He married Mary Tenney Gray June 14, 1859, in Conklin, New York. He died December 25, 1918, in Kansas City, Kansas, and was buried at that city's Oak Grove Cemetery.
