= Barzillai Weeks House =

Historic house in Massachusetts, United States

- U.S. National Register of Historic Places
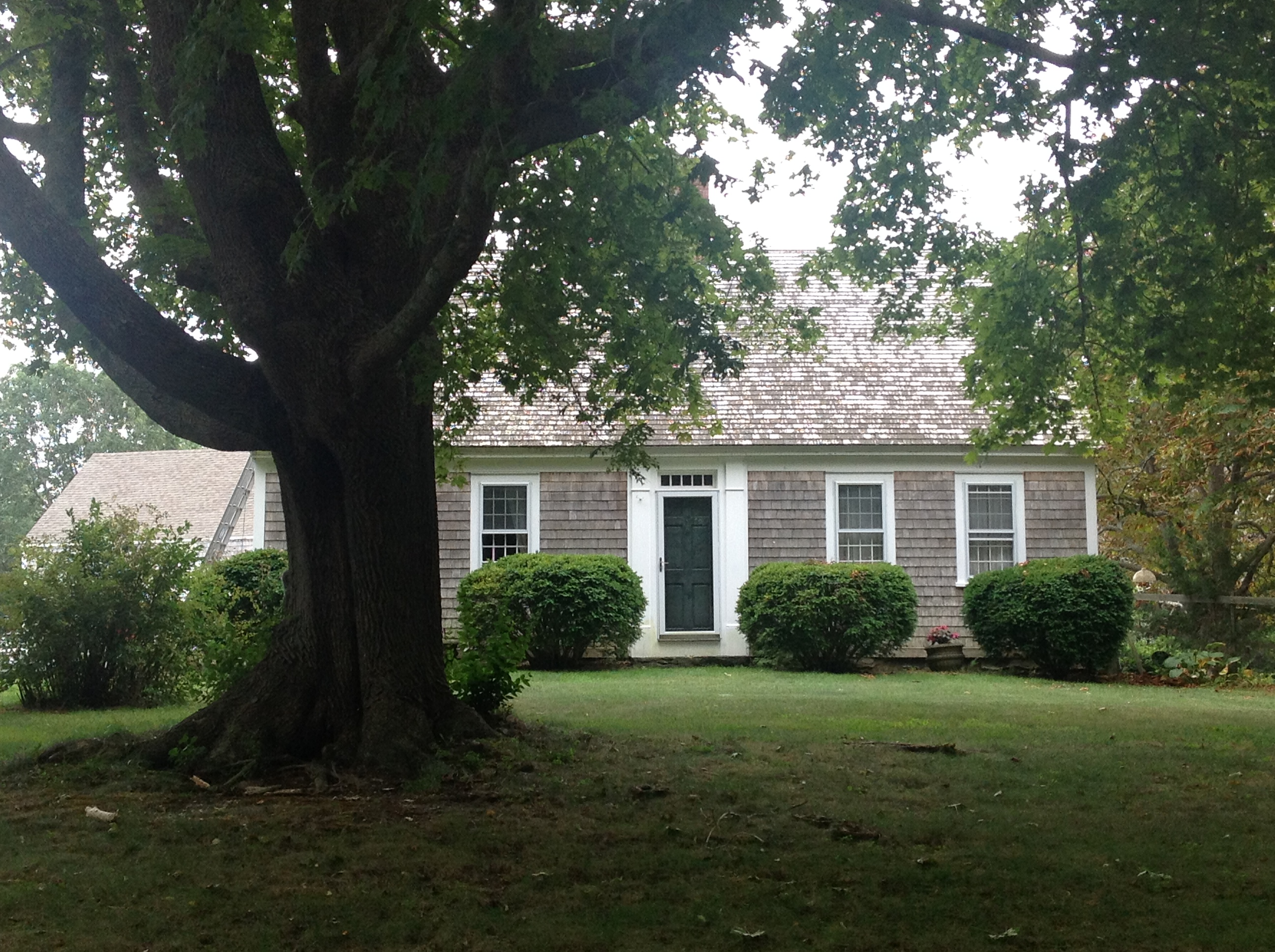

- Location within Cape Cod Location within Massachusetts Location within the United States
- Location: Barnstable, Massachusetts
- Coordinates: 41°43′15″N 70°23′59″W
- Area: 1.84 acres (0.74 ha)
- Built: 1799
- MPS: Barnstable MRA
- NRHP reference No.: 87000241
- Added to NRHP: March 13, 1987

The Barzillai Weeks House is a historic house located at 313 High Street in the West Barnstable section of Barnstable, Massachusetts.

== Description and history ==
The 1 1/2-story Cape style house was built in 1799 by Barzillai Weeks. The house was the center of a local farm for over 150 years, most of them under the ownership of Weeks' descendants. The house has well-preserved Federal styling, most prominent in the five-pane transom window over the main entrance.

The house was listed on the National Register of Historic Places on March 13, 1987.

== See also ==
- National Register of Historic Places listings in Barnstable County, Massachusetts
