= List of American suffragists =

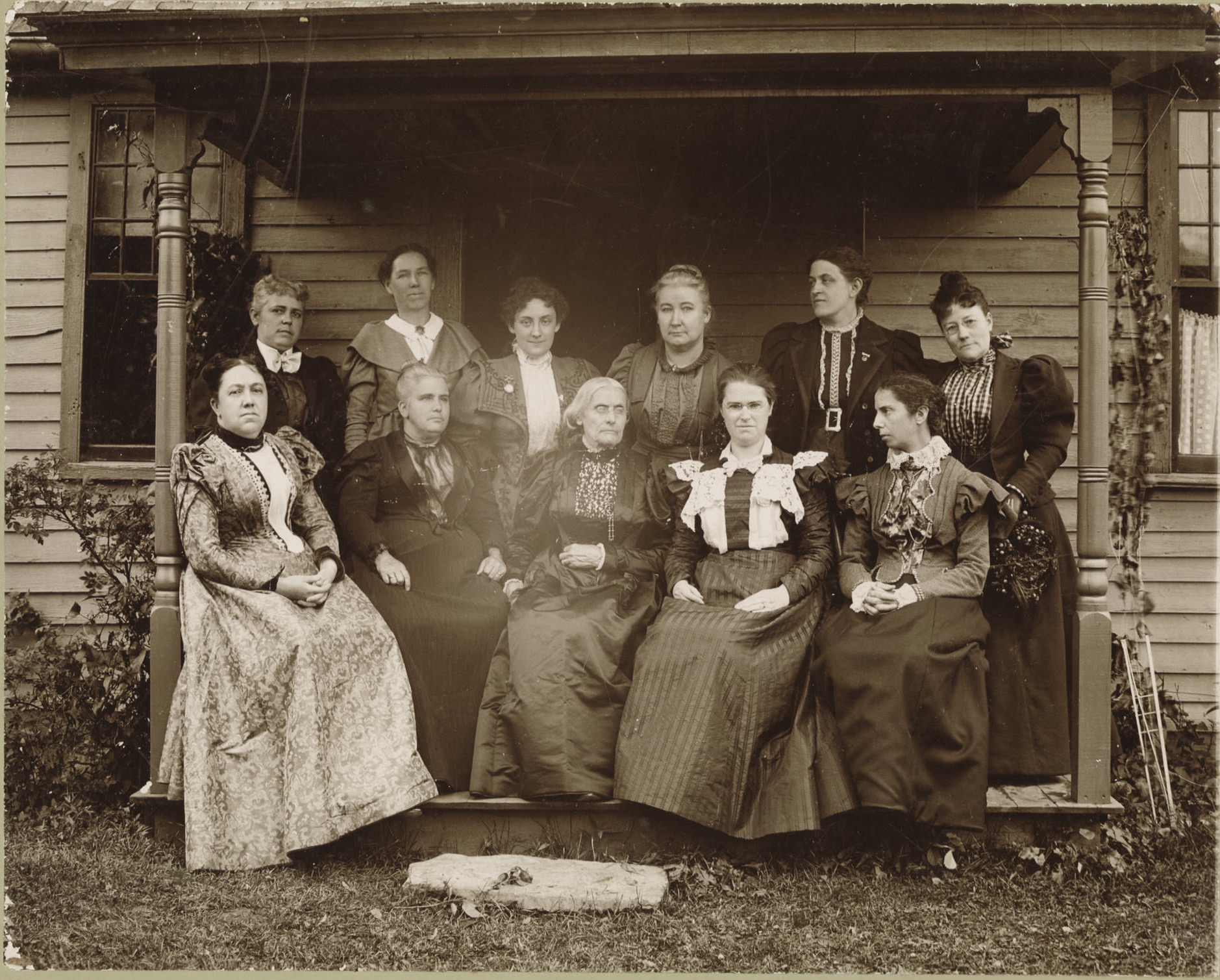
Susan B Anthony (center) with Laura Clay, Anna Howard Shaw, Alice Stone Blackwell, Annie Kennedy Bidwell, Carrie Chapman Catt, Ida Husted Harper, and Rachel Foster Avery in 1896

This is a list of suffragists and suffrage activists working in the United States and its territories. This list includes suffragists who worked across state lines or nationally. See individual state or territory lists for other American suffragists not listed here.

== Groups ==
- American Equal Rights Association (AERA), created in 1866
- American Woman Suffrage Association (AWSA), created in 1869
- Association for the Advancement of Women (AAW)
- College Equal Suffrage League
- Congressional Union for Woman Suffrage
- Equal Franchise Society.
- The Men's League
- National American Woman Suffrage Association (NAWSA), created in 1890 through the merger of AWSA and NWSA
- National Woman Suffrage Association (NWSA)
- Prison Special
- Silent Sentinels
- Suffrage Special
- Swimming suffragists

== Suffragists ==
=== A ===
- Mary Newbury Adams (1837–1901) – suffragist and education advocate
- Teresa Adams (c 1869 –1947) – African-American suffragist, leader of the Iowa Association of Colored Women's Clubs (IACWC) suffrage committee
- Jane Addams (1860–1935) – social activist and suffragist
- Nina E. Allender (1873–1957) – speaker, organizer and cartoonist
- Naomi Anderson (1863–1899) – African-American suffragist, temperance advocate
- Susan B. Anthony (1820–1906) – co-founder and leader National Woman Suffrage Association (NWSA), one of the leaders of the National American Woman Suffrage Association; Nineteenth Amendment to the United States Constitution, which guaranteed the right of women to vote, was popularly known as the Susan B Anthony Amendment
- Annie Arniel (1873–1924) – member of the Silent Sentinels, arrested eight times in direct actions
- Rachel Foster Avery (1858–1919) – corresponding secretary for NWSA and the International Council of Women; vice president of NAWSA

=== B ===
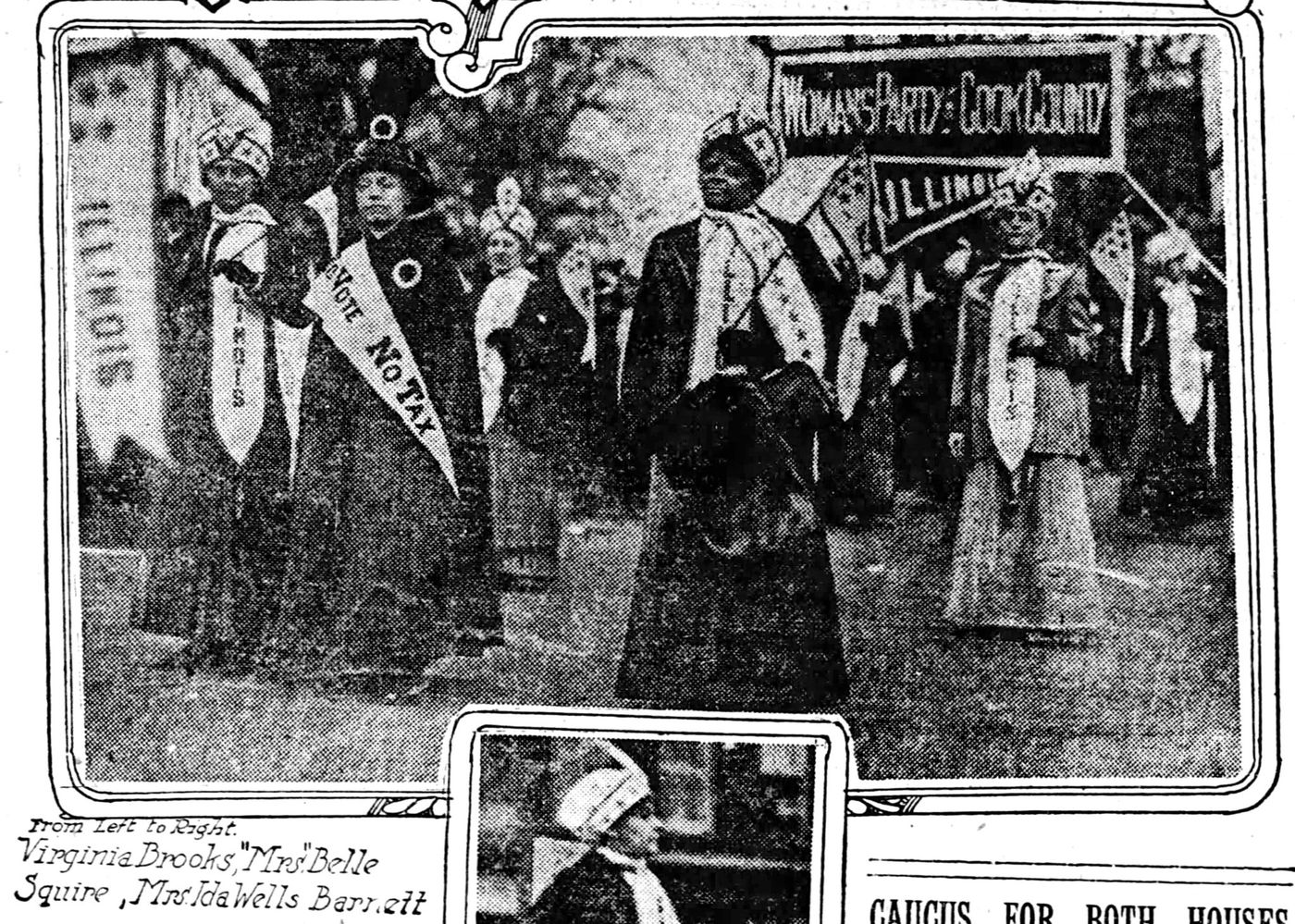
Ida B. Wells-Barnett at a 1913 suffrage parade

- Elnora Monroe Babcock (1852–1934) – pioneer leader in the suffrage movement; chair of the NAWSA press department.
- Addie L. Ballou (1838–1916) – activist, journalist and lecturer on temperance, women's suffrage, and prison reform
- Alva Belmont (1853–1933) – founder of the Political Equality League that was in 1913 merged into the Congressional Union for Woman Suffrage
- Elsie Lincoln Benedict (1885–1970) – suffragist leader and speaker
- Alice Stone Blackwell (1857–1950) – journalist, activist, helped bring the AWSA and NWSA together
- Antoinette Brown Blackwell (1825–1921) – preacher and contributor to the Woman's Journal
- Henry Browne Blackwell (1825–1909) – co-founder of AWSA and Woman's Journal.
- Catharine Paine Blaine (1829–1908) – suffragist, teacher, and pioneer, one of the signers of the Declaration of Sentiments
- Lillie Devereux Blake (1833–1913) – writer, suffragist, reformer
- Harriot Eaton Stanton Blatch (1856–1940) – writer, contributor to History of Woman Suffrage, founded Women's Political Union, daughter of pioneering activist Elizabeth Cady Stanton
- Amelia Bloomer (1818–1894) – women's rights and temperance advocate; her name was associated with women's clothing reform style known as bloomers
- Marietta Bones (1842–1901) – suffragist, social reformer, philanthropist
- Helen Varick Boswell (1869–1942) – member of the Woman's National Republican Association and the General Federation of Women's Clubs
- Lucy Gwynne Branham (1892–1966) – professor, organizer, lobbyist, active in the National Women's Party and its Silent Sentinels, daughter of suffragette Lucy Fisher Gwynne Branham
- Olympia Brown (1835–1926) – activist, first woman to graduate from a theological school, as well as becoming the first full-time ordained minister, suffrage speaker
- Lucy Burns (1879–1966) – women's rights advocate, co-founder of the National Woman's Party

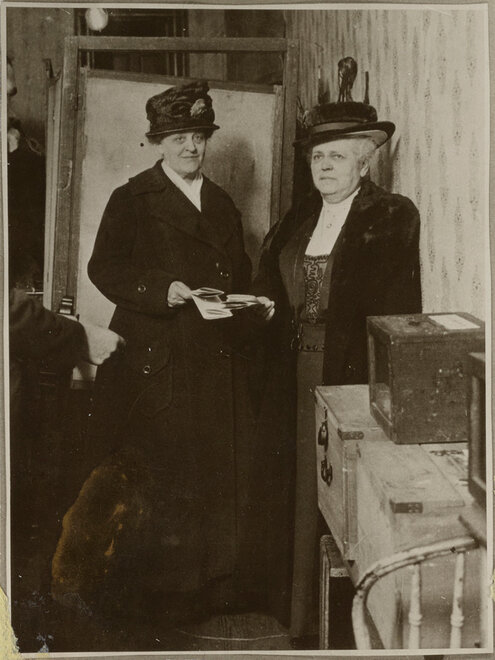
Carrie Chapman Catt and Mary Garrett Hay casting their votes in 1918

=== C ===
- Jennie Curtis Cannon (1851–1929) – vice president of NAWSA
- Marion Hamilton Carter (1865–1937) – educator, journalist, suffragist author
- Carrie Chapman Catt (1859–1947) – president of the National American Woman Suffrage Association, founder of the League of Women Voters and the International Alliance of Women, campaigned for the Nineteenth Amendment to the United States Constitution
- Emily Thornton Charles (1845–1895) – poet, journalist, suffragist, newspaper founder.
- Tennessee Celeste Claflin (1844–1923) – one of the first women to open a Wall Street brokerage firm, advocate of legalized prostitution
- Laura Clay (1849–1941) – co-founder and first president of Kentucky Equal Rights Association, leader of women's suffrage movement, active in the Democratic Party
- Mary Barr Clay (1839–1924) – first Kentuckian to hold the office of president in a national woman's organization (American Woman Suffrage Association), and the first Kentucky woman to speak publicly on women's rights
- Emily Parmely Collins (1814–1909) – in South Bristol, New York, 1848, was the first woman in the US to establish a society focused on woman suffrage and women's rights
- Helen Appo Cook (1837–1913) – prominent African-American community activist and leader in the women's club movement
- Mary Leggett Cooke (1852–1938) – Unitarian minister; suffragist
- Ida Craft (1861–1947) – known as the Colonel, took part in Suffrage Hikes

=== D ===
- Carrie Chase Davis (1863–1953) – physician, suffragist
- Paulina Kellogg Wright Davis (1813–1876) – a founder of the New England Woman Suffrage Association; active with the National Woman Suffrage Association; co-arranged and presided at the first National Women's Rights Convention
- Rheta Childe Dorr (1868–1948) – journalist, suffragist newspaper editor, writer, and political activist
- Frederick Douglass (1818–1895) – African-American social reformer, orator, writer, statesman
- Miriam Howard Dubose (1862–1945) – a founder of Georgia Woman Suffrage Association (GWSA)
- Joseph A. Dugdale (1810-1896) – Quaker social reformer, orator, abolitionist

=== E ===
- Crystal Eastman (1881–1928) – lawyer, antimilitarist, feminist, socialist, and journalist
- Mary F. Eastman – educator, lecturer and writer
- Max Eastman (1883–1969) – writer, philosopher, poet, political activist
- Julia Emory (1885–1979) – suffragist from Maryland, protestor with the Silent Sentinels
- Elizabeth Piper Ensley (1848–1919) – Caribbean-American woman who was the treasurer of the Colorado Non-Partisan Equal Suffrage Association
- Elizabeth Glendower Evans (1856–1937) – social reformer and suffragist

=== F ===
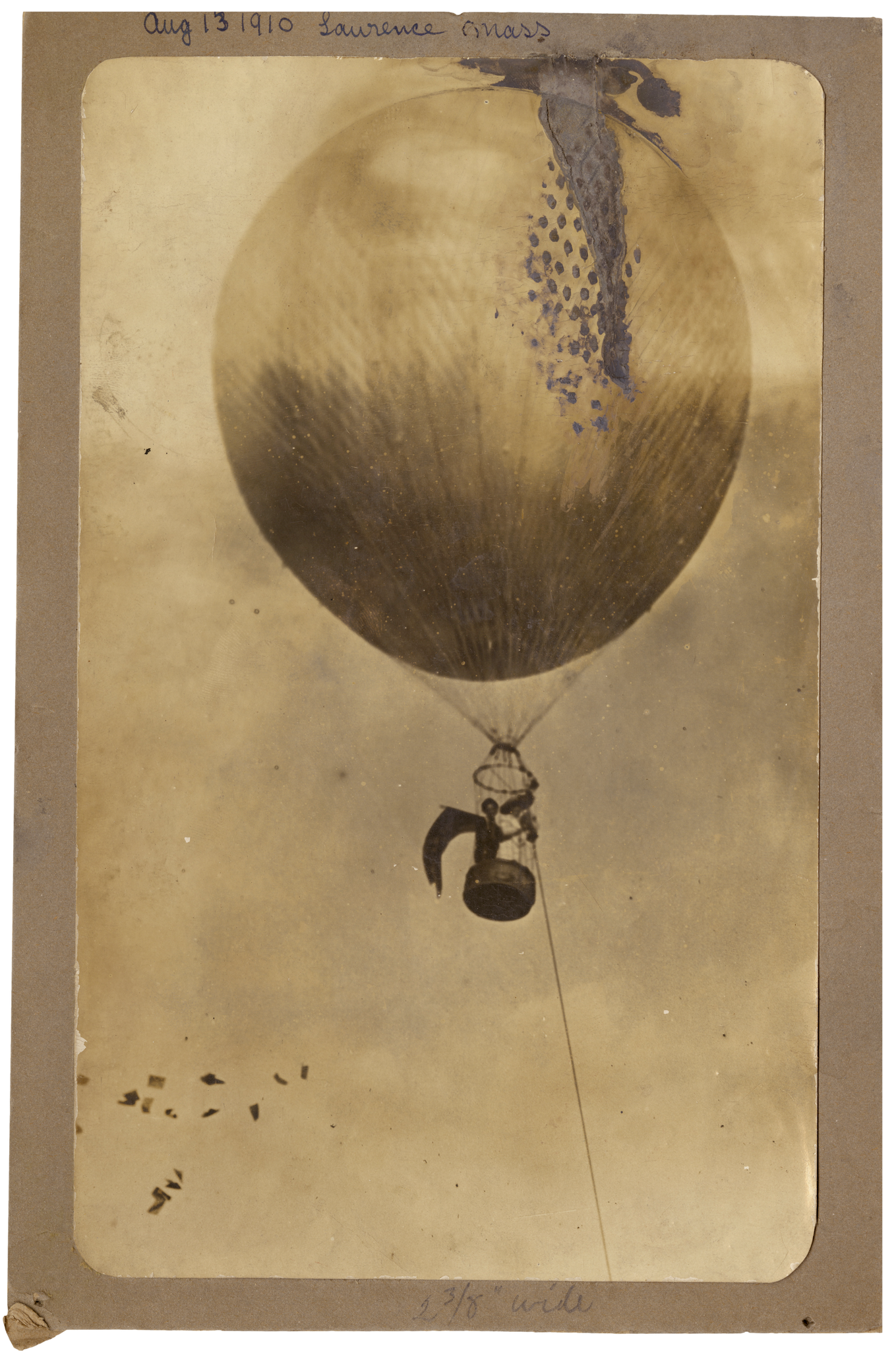
Margaret Foley in a balloon, distributing women's suffrage literature in Lawrence, Massachusetts in 1910

- Janet Ayer Fairbank (1878–1951) – author and champion of progressive causes
- Lillian Feickert (1877–1945) – suffragette; first woman from New Jersey to run for United States Senate
- Mary Fels (1863–1953) – philanthropist, suffragist, Georgist
- Sara Bard Field (1882–1974) – active with the National Advisory Council, National Woman's Party, and in Oregon and Nevada; crossed the US to deliver a petition with 500,000 signatures to President Wilson
- Margaret Foley (1875–1957) – working class suffragist, active in Massachusetts and campaigning in other states
- Mariana Thompson Folsom (1845–1909) – Universalist minister and lecturer for Iowa Suffrage Association and Texas Equal Rights
- Elisabeth Freeman (1876–1942) – Suffrage Hike participant and activist
- Antoinette Funk (1869–1942) – lawyer and executive secretary of the Congressional Committee of the National American Woman Suffrage Association; supporter of the women's movement in WWI

=== G ===
- Matilda Joslyn Gage (1826–1898) – activist, freethinker, author, co-founder of NWSA
- Helen Hoy Greeley (1878–1965) – secretary, New Jersey Next Campaign (1915), stump speaker, organizer, and mobilizer in California and Oregon campaigns (1911), speaker for Women's Political Union in NYC
- Josephine Sophia White Griffing (1814–1872) – active in the American Equal Rights Association and the National Woman Suffrage Association
- Sarah Moore Grimké (1792–1873) – abolitionist, writer

=== H ===
- Blanche Moore Haines (1865–1944) – physician; Michigan State chair of the National Woman Suffrage Association
- Ida Husted Harper (1851–1931) – organizer, major writer and historian of the US suffrage movement
- Florence Jaffray Harriman (1870–1967) – social reformer, organizer and diplomat
- Oreola Williams Haskell (1875–1953) – prolific author and poet, who worked alongside other notable suffrage activists, such as Carrie Chapman Catt, Mary Garrett Hay, and Ida Husted Harper
- Mary Garrett Hay (1857–1928) – suffrage organizer around the US
- Elsie Hill (1883–1970) – NWP activist
- Helena Hill (1875–1958) – NWP activist, jailed for protest
- Julia Ward Howe (1819–1910) – prominent abolitionist, social activist and poet
- Emily Howland (1827–1929) – philanthropist, educator

=== I ===
- Inez Haynes Irwin (1873–1970) – co-founder of the College Equal Suffrage League, active in National Woman's Party, wrote the party's history
- Josephine Irwin (1890–1984) – suffragist from Ohio, advocate for Equal Rights Amendment

=== J ===
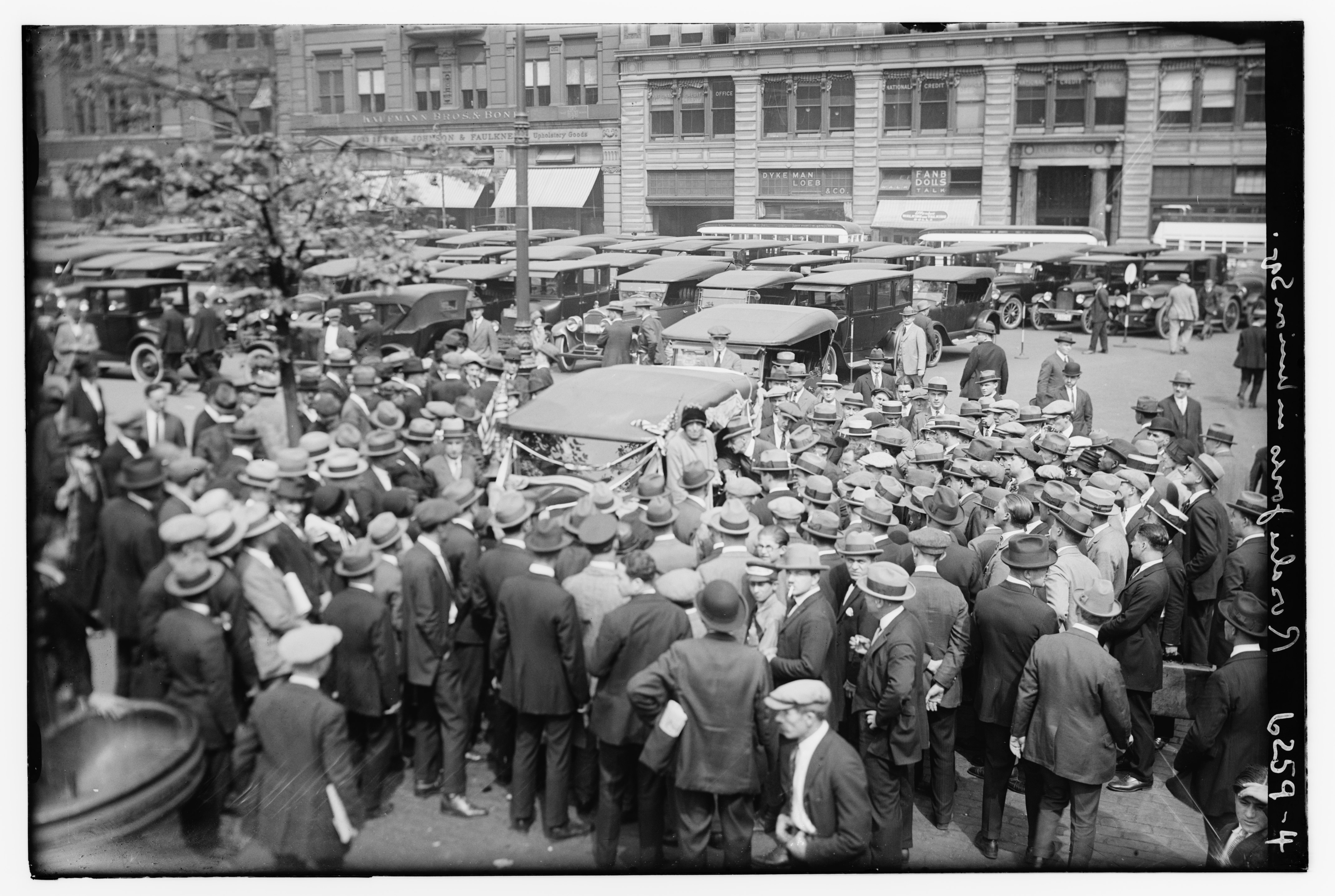
Rosalie Jones speaking in Union Square, 1900

- Martha Waldron Janes (1832–1913) – minister, suffragist, columnist.
- Hester C. Jeffrey (1842–1934) – African-American community organizer, creator of the Susan B. Anthony clubs
- Izetta Jewel (1883–1978) – stage actress, women's rights activist, politician and first woman to second the nomination of a presidential candidate at a major American political party convention
- Laura M. Johns (1849–1935) – suffragist, journalist
- Adelaide Johnson (1859–1955) – sculptor who created a monument for suffragists in Washington, D.C.
- Maria I. Johnston (1835–1921) – author, journalist, editor and lecturer from Virginia
- Mary Johnston (1870–1936) – Virginia writer, author, and activist, spoke at the 1913 Woman Suffrage Procession
- Jane Elizabeth Jones (1813–1896) – suffragist, abolitionist, member of the early women's rights movement
- Rosalie Gardiner Jones (1883–1978) – socialite, took part in Suffrage Hike, known as "General Jones."
- Amy R. Juengling (1886–1974) – suffragist, educator, and women's rights activist

=== K ===
- Helen Keller (1880–1968) – author and political activist
- Lillian G. Kohlhamer (1870–1929) – suffragist and peace activist
- Florence E. Kollock (1848–1925) – Universalist minister and lecturer

=== L ===
- Mary Livermore (1820–1905) – journalist and advocate of women's rights
- Adella Hunt Logan (1863–1915) – African-American intellectual, activist and leading suffragist of the historically black Tuskegee University's Woman's Club

=== M ===
- Katherine Duer Mackay (1878–1930) – founder of the Equal Franchise Society.
- Eugenia St. John Mann (1847–1932) – ordained minister, evangelist, temperance lecturer, suffragist; president, Kansas Equal Suffrage Association
- Ellen A. Martin (1847–1916) – Illinois lawyer, successfully voted in 1891 because she found a loophole in her town charter
- Katharine McCormick (1875-1967) – vice president and treasurer of NAWSA; vice president of League of Women Voters
- Inez Milholland (1886–1916) – key participant in the National Woman's Party and the 1913 Woman Suffrage Procession
- Virginia Minor (1824–1894) – co-founder and president of the Woman's Suffrage Association of Missouri; unsuccessfully argued in Minor v Happersett (1874 Supreme Court case) that the Fourteenth Amendment gave women the right to vote
- Lucretia Mott (1793–1880) – Quaker, abolitionist; women's rights activist; social reformer

=== N ===
- John Neal (1793–1876) – writer, critic, first American women's rights lecturer
- Harriet Noble (1851–1919), American academic and suffragist
- Mary A. Nolan (died 1925) – one of the oldest suffragists active on NWP picket lines

=== O ===
- Adelina Otero-Warren (1881–1965) – Congressional Union leader in New Mexico, honored on a 2022 American Women quarter
- Gwendolen Overton (1874/76-1958) – favored woman suffrage; wrote magazine and newspaper articles on the topic

=== P ===
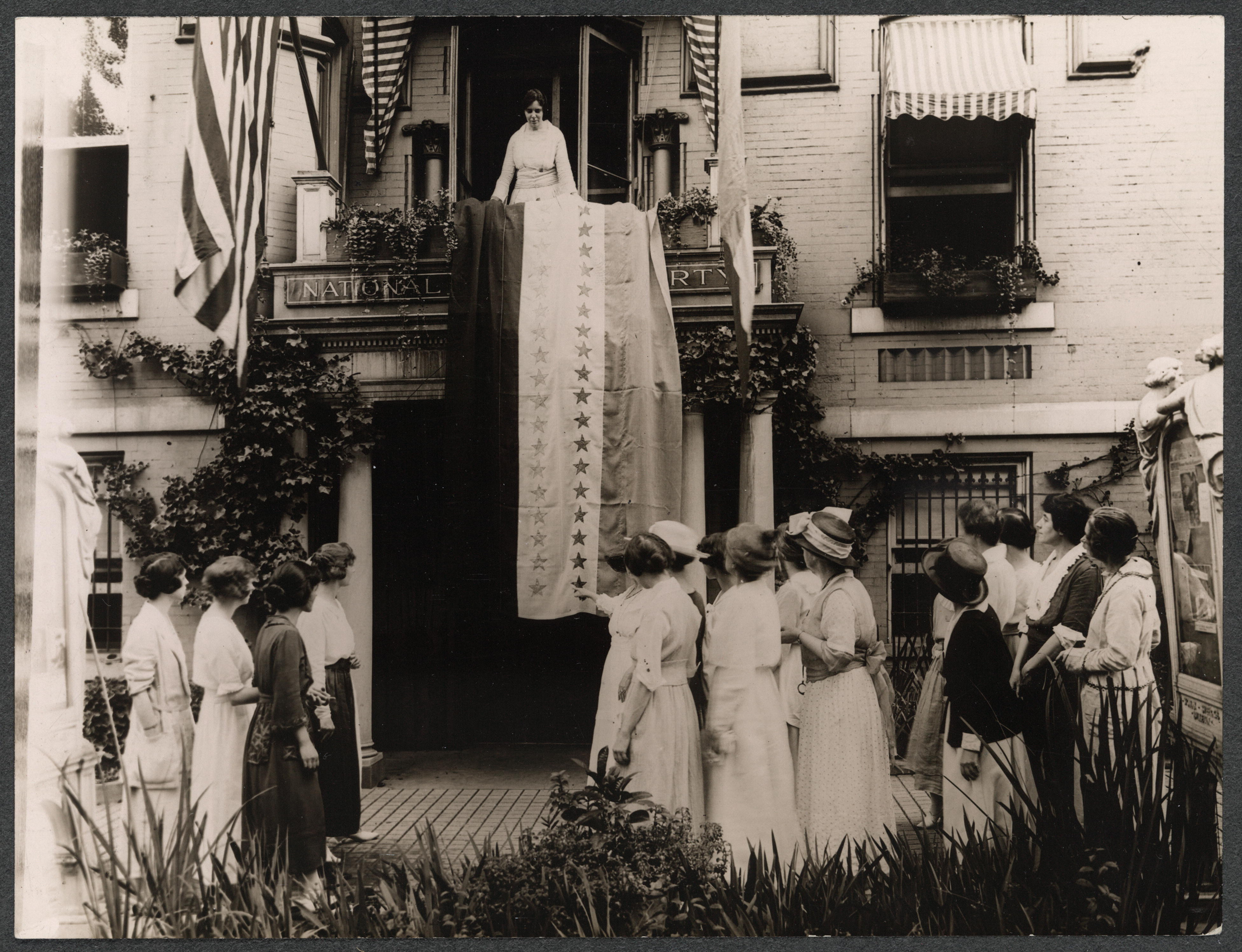
Alice Paul, National Chairman of the Woman's Party, August 18, 1920

- Mary Hutcheson Page (1860–1940) – member of the Boston Equal Suffrage Association for Good Government, the National American Woman Suffrage Association, and the National Executive Committee of the Congressional Union for Women Suffrage; 1910 president of the National Woman Suffrage Association
- Maud Wood Park (1871–1955) – founder of the College Equal Suffrage League, co-founder of the Boston Equal Suffrage Association for Good Government (BESAGG); worked for passage of the 19th Amendment
- Alice Paul (1885–1977) – one of the leaders of the 1910s Women's Voting Rights Movement for the 19th Amendment; founder of the National Woman's Party (NWP); initiator of the Silent Sentinels and Woman Suffrage Parade of 1913; author of the proposed Equal Rights Amendment
- Nanette B. Paul (1866-1928) – suffragist in Washington, D.C.; co-founder of the Susan B Anthony Foundation
- Mary Gray Peck (1867–1957) – journalist, suffragist, clubwoman
- Charlotte Woodward Pierce (1830–1924), suffragist
- Anita Pollitzer (1894–1975) – photographer, served as national chairman of NWP

=== R ===
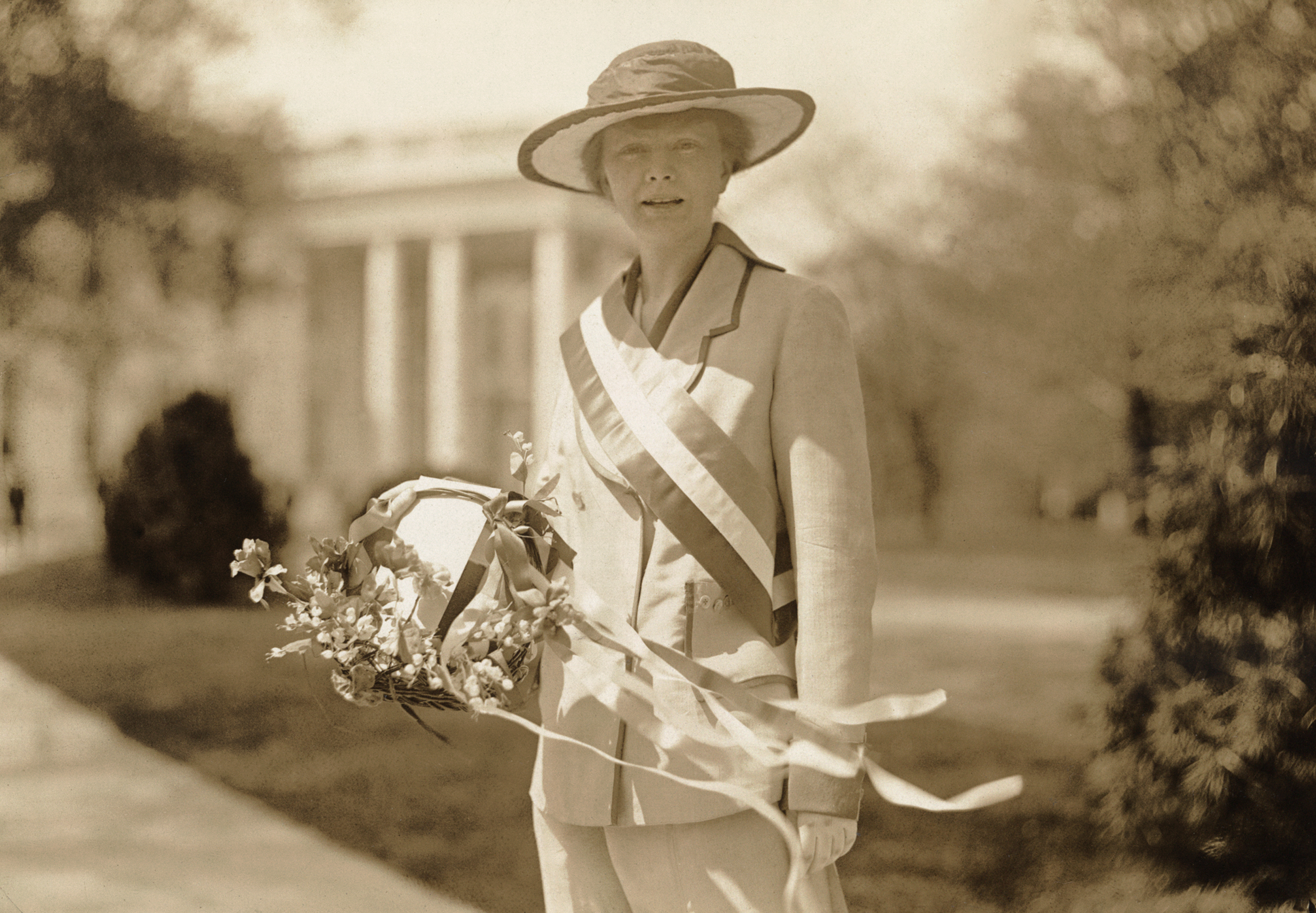
Joy Young Rogers outside the White House

- Jeannette Rankin (1880–1973) – first US female member of Congress, (R) Montana; opened congressional debate on a Constitutional amendment granting universal suffrage to women, and voted for the resolution in 1919, which would become the 19th Amendment
- Rebecca Hourwich Reyher (1897–1987) – author and lecturer
- Naomi Sewell Richardson (1892–1993) – African-American suffragist and educator
- Alice Gram Robinson (1895–1984) – suffrage activist involved with the Silent Sentinels
- Emma Winner Rogers (1855–1922) – treasurer, National American Woman Suffrage Association; also writer, speaker.
- Joy Young Rogers (1891–1953) – assistant editor of the Suffragist
- Ernestine Rose (1810–1892) – feminist, abolitionist, freethinker
- Juliet Barrett Rublee (1875–1966) – birth control advocate, suffragist, and film producer
- Josephine St Pierre Ruffin (1842–1924) – African-American publisher, journalist, civil rights leader, suffragist, and editor
- Lillian Russell (1861–1922) – actress and singer

=== S ===
- Margaret Sanger (1879–1966) – birth control activist, sex educator, nurse, established Planned Parenthood Federation of America
- Nancy Schoonmaker (1873–1965) – writer, politician and suffragist
- Florida Scott-Maxwell (1883–1979) – American author and suffragist active in the UK
- Mabel Seagrave (1882–1935) – physician and suffragist representing NAWSA
- May Wright Sewall (1844–1920) – chairperson of the National Woman's Suffrage Association's (NWSA) executive committee 1882–1890
- Anna Howard Shaw (1847–1919) – president of National American Women's Suffrage Association (NAWSA) 1904–1915
- Mary Shaw (1854–1929) – early feminist, playwright and actress
- Ethel M. Smith (1877–1951) – NAWSA and NWP activist
- Elizabeth Cady Stanton (1815–1902) – initiator of the Seneca Falls Convention, author of the Declaration of Sentiments, co-founder of National Women's Suffrage Association, major pioneer of women's rights in America
- Doris Stevens (1892–1963) – organizer for NAWSA and the National Woman's Party (NWP), prominent Silent Sentinels participant, author of Jailed for Freedom
- Lucy Stone (1818–1893) – prominent orator, abolitionist, and a vocal advocate and organizer for the rights for women; the main force behind the American Woman Suffrage Association and the Woman's Journal
- Betty Gram Swing (1893–1969) – militant suffragist, worked on the New Jersey and Tennessee ratification campaigns

=== T ===
Sojourner Truth, 1864

- Helen Taft (1891–1987) – daughter of President William Howard Taft
- Lydia Taft (1712–1778) – first woman alleged to legally vote in colonial America
- Minnetta Theodora Taylor (1860–1911) – wrote the lyrics to the National Suffrage Anthem
- Mary Church Terrell (1863–1954) – African-American educator, journalist, and co-founder of the National Association of Colored Women's League
- M. Carey Thomas (1857–1935) – educator, linguist, and second president of Bryn Mawr College
- Dorothy Thompson (1893–1961) – Buffalo and New York activist, later journalist and radio broadcaster
- Ella St. Clair Thompson (1870–1944) – suffragist active in the NWP
- Ellen Powell Thompson (1840–1911) – educator and botanist
- Grace Gallatin Seton Thompson (1872–1959) – author
- Elizabeth Richards Tilton (1834–1897) – suffragist, founder of the Brooklyn Women's Club, poetry editor of The Revolution
- Helen M. Todd (1870–19523) – suffragist activist in several states, envoy for the Suffrage Special
- Anna Augusta Truitt (1837–1920) – temperance advocate who supported suffrage.
- Sojourner Truth (c. 1797–1883) – abolitionist, women's rights activist, speaker, gave women's rights speech "Ain't I a Woman?"
- Harriet Tubman (1822–1913) – African-American abolitionist, humanitarian and Union spy during the American Civil War

=== V ===
- Narcissa Cox Vanderlip, née Mabel Narcissa Cox (1879–1966) – leading New York suffragist and co-founder of the New York State League of Women Voters
- Mabel Vernon (1883–1975) – principal member of the Congressional Union for Women Suffrage, major organizer for the Silent Sentinels

=== W ===
- Lois Waisbrooker (1826–1909) – author, lecturer and journalist
- Mary Edwards Walker (1832–1919) – physician, officer and lecturer
- Ida B. Wells-Barnett (1862–1931) – African-American journalist, newspaper editor, suffragist, sociologist, and early leader in the civil rights movement
- Ruza Wenclawska (1889–1977) – factory inspector and trade union organizer
- Marion Craig Wentworth (1872–1942) – playwright
- Madree Penn White (1892–1967) – educator and activist, founding member of Delta Sigma Theta
- Margaret Fay Whittemore (1884–1937) – NWP activist and campaigner throughout the US, part of the Suffrage Special
- Charlotte Beebe Wilbour (1833–1914) – feminist and suffrage activist
- Eliza Tupper Wilkes (1844–1917) – preacher and suffragist speaking and representing several states
- Frances Willard (1839–1898) – leader of the Women's Christian Temperance Union and International Council of Women, lecturer, writer
- Ella B Ensor Wilson (1838–1913) – social reformer.
- Alice Beach Winter (1877–1968) – artist and socialist
- Victoria Woodhull (1838–1927) – women's rights activist, first woman to speak before a committee of Congress, first female candidate for president of the United States, one of the first women to start a weekly newspaper (Woodhull & Claflin's Weekly), activist for labor reforms, advocate of free love
- Frances Woods (1864–1959), NAWSA organizer across several states
- Alice Morgan Wright (1881–1975) – artist and suffragist in both Europe and the US
- Henry Clarke Wright (1797–1870) – abolitionist, peace activist and suffragist

=== Y ===
- Rose Emmet Young (1869–1941) – suffragist, editor and writer

== Suffragists by state or territory ==
A

- List of Alabama suffragists
- List of Alaska suffragists
- List of Arizona suffragists
- List of Arkansas suffragists

C

- List of California suffragists
- List of Colorado suffragists
- List of Connecticut suffragists

D

- List of Delaware suffragists

F

- List of Florida suffragists

G

- List of Georgia (U.S. state) suffragists

H

- List of Hawaii suffragists

I

- List of Idaho suffragists
- List of Illinois suffragists
- List of Indiana suffragists
- List of Iowa suffragists

K

- List of Kansas suffragists
- List of Kentucky suffragists

L

- List of Louisiana suffragists

M

- List of Maine suffragists
- List of Maryland suffragists
- List of Massachusetts suffragists
- List of Michigan suffragists
- List of Minnesota suffragists
- List of Mississippi suffragists
- List of Missouri suffragists
- List of Montana suffragists

N

- List of Nebraska suffragists
- List of Nevada suffragists
- List of New Hampshire suffragists
- List of New Jersey suffragists
- List of New Mexico suffragists
- List of New York (state) suffragists
- List of North Carolina suffragists
- List of North Dakota suffragists

O

- List of Ohio suffragists
- List of Oklahoma suffragists
- List of Oregon suffragists

P

- List of Pennsylvania suffragists
- List of Puerto Rico suffragists

R

- List of Rhode Island suffragists

S

- List of South Carolina suffragists
- List of South Dakota suffragists

T

- List of Tennessee suffragists
- List of Texas suffragists

U

- List of United States Virgin Islands suffragists
- List of Utah suffragists

V

- List of Vermont suffragists
- List of Virginia suffragists

W

- List of Washington (state) suffragists
- List of Washington, D.C. suffragists
- List of West Virginia suffragists
- List of Wisconsin suffragists
- List of Wyoming suffragists

== See also ==
- Art in the women's suffrage movement in the United States
- List of African American suffragists
- List of suffragists and suffragettes
- Timeline of women's suffrage in the United States
- Women's suffrage in states of the United States
- Women's suffrage in the United States
