= Coston (surname) =

Coston is a surname. Notable people with the surname include:

- Anthony Coston, birth name of Lumumba Shakur (1942–1986); American activist
- Bernadette Coston (born 1989), South African field hockey player
- Frances Berry Coston (1876–1960), American journalist, educator, suffragist
  - Jean Coston Maloney (1916–1968), American pianist, Frances Berry Coston's daughter
- Henry Coston (1910–2001), French journalist, writer and Nazi collaborator
- Jeff Coston (born 1955), American golfer
- Junius Coston (born 1983), American football player
- Martha Coston (1826–1904), American inventor and businesswoman

== See also ==
- Costen
