= List of Indiana suffragists =

This is a list of Indiana suffragists, suffrage groups and others associated with the cause of women's suffrage in Indiana.

== Groups ==
- Equal Suffrage League.
- Indiana State Woman Suffrage Society.
- Indiana Women's Suffrage Association
- Woman's Franchise League of Indiana

== Suffragists ==
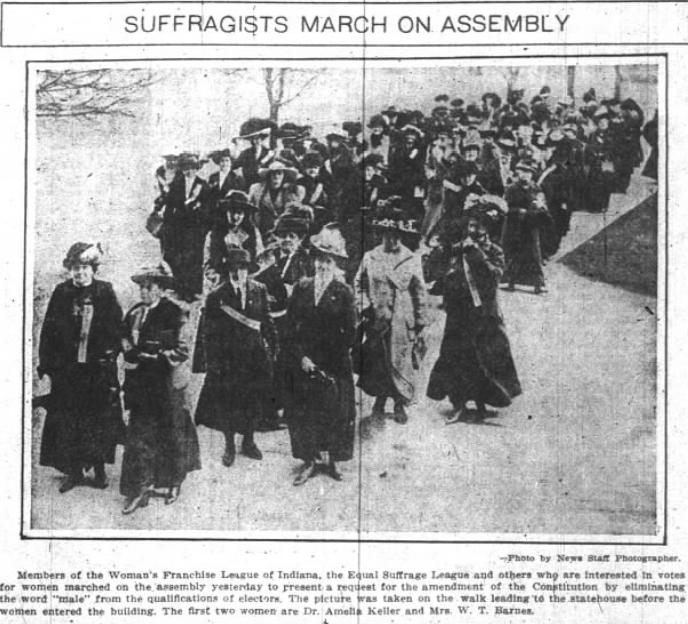
Indianapolis suffragists march on state assembly 4 March 1913

- Georgia Alexander (1868–1928), textbook author and educator; Director, Woman's Franchise League of Indiana (affiliated with the National American Woman Suffrage Association).
- Helen Vickroy Austin (1829–1921) – journalist, horticulturist, suffragist.
- Marion Harvie Barnard (1872–1969) - treasurer of the Indiana NAWSA chapter.
- Grace Julian Clarke (1865–1938) - women's suffrage activist, clubwoman, journalist
- Frances Berry Coston (1876–1960) - journalist, educator, suffragist
- Helen M. Gougar (1843–1907) - lawyer, temperance advocate and suffragist.
- Ida Husted Harper (1851–1931) – organizer, major writer and historian of the US suffrage movement.
- Mary Garrett Hay (1857–1928) – suffrage organizer around the United States.
- Mary A. McCurdy (1852–1934) – African American suffragist.
- Zeola Hershey Misener (1878–1966) – Indiana suffragist and politician.
- Elizabeth Bunnell Read (1832–1909) – published The Mayflower, the only suffrage paper published during the American Civil War; Vice-president, Indiana State Woman Suffrage Society; President of the Iowa State Woman Suffrage Society.
- Carrie Barnes Ross (1880s-1918) - served as president of Branch No. 7 of the Equal Suffrage League of Indiana, composed of members from Indianapolis's Black community.
- Mary Frame Thomas (1816–1888) - physician and suffragist.
- Amanda Way (1828–1914) - temperance advocate and suffragist.
- Mary Holloway Wilhite (1831–1892) – physician, philanthropist; woman's suffrage and women's rights leader.

== Suffragists campaigning in Indiana ==
- Margaret Foley.
- Frances Dana Barker Gage
