= Branham =

Branham may refer to:

- Branham (surname)
- 4140 Branham, a main-belt asteroid
- Branham (VTA), a light rail station operated by Santa Clara Valley Transportation Authority
- Branham High School, a secondary school located in San Jose, California

== See also ==
- Barnham (disambiguation)
- Branham House (disambiguation)
- Branham sign
