= List of Washington, D.C., suffragists =

This is a list of suffragists and groups from or who worked in Washington, D.C.

This is a list of Washington, D.C., suffragists, suffrage groups and others associated with the cause of women's suffrage in Washington, D.C.

== Groups ==
- District of Columbia Woman Suffrage Association.

== Suffragists ==
- Nina E. Allender (1873–1957), artist, cartoonist, and women's rights activist.
- Anna E. Hendley (1865–1945), founder and leader of the Anthony League.
- Adelaide Johnson (1859–1955) – sculptor who created a monument for suffragists in Washington D.C.
- Eunice Rockwood Oberly (1878–1921) – librarian.
- Helen Pitts (1838–1903) – active in women's rights movement and co-edited The Alpha.
- Evelyn Wotherspoon Wainwright (1851–1929) – founding member of the Congressional Union for Woman Suffrage and the National Woman's Party.
- Nettie L. White (c. 1850 – 1921), president of the District of Columbia Woman Suffrage Association.

== Suffragists campaigning in Washington, D.C. ==
- Laura M. Johns.

Nathan Bedford Forrest

== See also ==
- List of American suffragists
