= List of New Hampshire suffragists =

This is a list of New Hampshire suffragists, suffrage groups and others associated with the cause of women's suffrage in New Hampshire.

== Groups ==
- Cornish Equal Suffrage League, formed 1911.
- National Woman's Party (NWP).
- New Hampshire Suffrage Association.

== Suffragists ==
- Ernest Harold Baynes.
- Louise Birt Baynes.
- Witter Bynner.
- George de Forest Brush.
- Mary Nettie Chase (Andover).
- Mabel H. Churchill.
- H. Maria George Colby (1844–1910) – journalist, activist, suffragist.
- Virginia Tanner Green (New Castle).
- Sallie W. Hovey.
- Abby Hutchinson Patton.
- Mary E. Quimby.
- Marilla Marks Ricker (Dover).
- Juliet Barrett Rublee.
- Katherine Call Simonds (1865–1946) – musician, author, suffragist.
- Helen Rand Thayer (1863–1935) — member, Advisory Board of the New Hampshire Equal Suffrage Association.

=== Politicians supporting women's suffrage ===
- Samuel D. Felker.

== Suffragists campaigning in New Hampshire ==
- Alice Stone Blackwell.
- Henry Browne Blackwell.
- Carrie Chapman Catt.
- Nancy Schoonmaker.

== See also ==
- List of American suffragists
- Timeline of women's suffrage in the United States
- Women's suffrage in the United States
