= List of Michigan suffragists =

This is a list of Michigan suffragists, suffrage groups and others associated with the cause of women's suffrage in Michigan.

== Groups ==
- Michigan State Equal Suffrage Association

== Suffragists ==
- Octavia Williams Bates (1846–1911) – suffragist, clubwoman, author
- Mary L. Doe (1836–1913) – first president of the Michigan State Equal Suffrage Association
- Eva Craig Graves Doughty (1852–1929) – president, Grand Rapids (Michigan) Equal Suffrage Association
- Ruth A. Gerry (1828–1876) – suffragist, 19th-century Michigan physician, lobbied University of Michigan to admit female medical students.
- Lottie Wilson Jackson (1854–1914) – painter and suffragist
- Emily Burton Ketcham (1838–1907) – suffragist, founded many suffrage groups in Grand Rapids

== Suffragists campaigning in Michigan ==
- Margaret Foley

== See also ==
- List of African American suffragists
- List of American suffragists
