= List of Louisiana suffragists =

This is a list of Louisiana suffragists, suffrage groups and others associated with the cause of women's suffrage in Louisiana.

== Groups ==
- The Men's League, chapter formed in 1915.

== Suffragists ==
- Irene W. Griffin (died 2012) – first black woman to register to vote in Plaquemines Parish, Louisiana.
- Florence Frances Huberwald – singer, teacher, suffragist.
- Genevieve Clark Thomson (New Orleans).

== Suffragists campaigning in Louisiana ==
- Margaret Foley.

== See also ==
- List of American suffragists
