= Coston =

Coston may refer to:

== Places ==
- Coston, Leicestershire
- Coston, Norfolk

== Other uses ==
- Coston (surname)
