= List of Oregon suffragists =

This is a list of Oregon suffragists, suffrage groups and others associated with the cause of women's suffrage in Oregon.

== Suffragists ==
- Abigail Scott Duniway (1834–1915) – women's rights advocate, editor, writer.
- Sara Bard Field (1882–1974) – active with the National Advisory Council, National Woman's Party, and in Oregon and Nevada; crossed the US to deliver a petition with 500,000 signatures to President Wilson.
- Maria L. T. Hidden.
- Harriet Redmond (c. 1862–1952) – Oregon suffragist.
- Mary A. Cooke Thompson (1825–1919) – central figure in the Oregon suffragist movement.
- Emma Wold (1871–1950) – president of the College Equal Suffrage Association in Oregon.

== Suffragists who campaigned in Oregon ==
- Helen Hoy Greeley.
- Lena Morrow Lewis.

== See also ==
- List of American suffragists
- Women's suffrage in the United States
