= Barnum (disambiguation) =

P. T. Barnum (1810–1891) was an American businessman and circus founder.

Barnum may also refer to:

== Places ==
=== United States ===
- Barnum, Iowa, a small city
- Barnum, Minnesota, a small city
- Barnum Township, Carlton County, Minnesota
- Barnum, Texas, an unincorporated community
- Barnum, West Virginia, an unincorporated community
- Barnum, Wisconsin, an unincorporated community

== People with the surname ==
- George S. Barnum (1819–1893), Wisconsin pioneer and state legislator
- Gertrude Barnum (1866–1948), American social worker and labor organizer
- H. B. Barnum (born 1936), American songwriter
- Harvey C. Barnum Jr. (born 1940), retired decorated US Marines officer and namesake of USS Harvey C. Barnum Jr.
- Henry A. Barnum (1833–1892), US Civil War general from New York
- Marcus H. Barnum (1834–1904), American politician

== Other uses ==
- Barnum effect, a cognitive bias named after P. T. Barnum
- Barnum (musical), a Broadway musical based on P.T. Barnum's life
- Barnum's American Museum, New York City, US
- Barnum, the largest coprolite from a carnivore, located at the Poozeum

== See also ==
- Barnham (disambiguation)
