= List of Oklahoma suffragists =

This is a list of Oklahoma suffragists, suffrage groups and others associated with the cause of women's suffrage in Oklahoma.

== Suffragists ==
- Kate Himrod Biggers (1849–1935) – president of the Oklahoma Woman's Suffrage Association.
- Winnie Branstetter (1879-1960) - socialist suffragette
- Elizabeth Fulton Hester (1839-1929) - suffragette in Indian Territory and later Oklahoma
- Abbie B. Rich Hillerman (1856-1945) - known as the "Mother of Prohibition" in Oklahoma
- Lucia Loomis (1887-1962) - a suffragette journalist who clashed with anti-suffragist journalist Edith Cherry Johnson

== Suffragists campaigning in Oklahoma ==
- Frances Woods.

== Anti-suffragists ==
- Edith Cherry Johnson (1879-1961) - an anti-suffragist writer for The Daily Oklahoman known as the voice of "traditional domesticity" in Oklahoma

== See also ==
- List of American suffragists
- Women's suffrage in the United States
