= List of Maryland suffragists =

This is a list of Maryland suffragists, suffrage groups and others associated with the cause of women's suffrage in Maryland.

== Groups ==
- American Woman Suffrage Association (AWSA).
- Just Government League.
- National American Woman Suffrage Association (NAWSA).

== Publications ==
- Maryland Suffrage News.

== Suffragists ==
- Julia Emory (1885–1979) – suffragist from Maryland, protestor with the Silent Sentinels.
- Edith Houghton Hooker (1879–1948) – activist, editor The Suffragist.
- Howard Kelly.
- Flora E. Strout (1867–1962) – Maryland delegate at American Woman Suffrage Association conventions.
- Lilian Welsh (1858–1938) – physician, educator, and advocate for women's health.

== Suffragists campaigning in Maryland ==
- Margaret Foley.
