= Barnham =

Barnham may refer to:

== People ==
- Alice Barnham (1592-1650), the wife Francis Bacon
- Benedict Barnham (c.1559-1598), an English merchant
- Stephen Barnham (died 1608), MP for Chichester, West Sussex

== Places ==
- Barnham, Suffolk, a village and civil parish in Suffolk, England
- Barnham, West Sussex, a village and civil parish in West Sussex, England
- Barnham Broom, a village and civil parish in Norfolk, England

== Other uses ==
- Barnham railway station, a railway station serving Barnham, West Sussex
- Barnham railway station (Suffolk), a former railway station serving Barnham, Suffolk
- RAF Barnham, a chemical and nuclear weapons store near Barnham, Suffolk

== See also ==
- Barnum (disambiguation)
- Branham (disambiguation)
