= Senator Emery =

Senator Emery may refer to:

- Ed Emery (politician) (1950–2021), Missouri State Senate
- Jim Emery (1934–2021), South Dakota State Senate
- Lewis Emery Jr. (1839–1924), Pennsylvania State Senate
- Lucilius A. Emery (1840–1920), Maine State Senate

== See also ==
- D. Hopper Emory (1841–1916), Maryland State Senate
