= List of Minnesota suffragists =

This is a list of Minnesota suffragists, suffrage groups and others associated with the cause of women's suffrage in Minnesota.

== Groups ==
- Minnesota Woman Suffrage Association.
- National Woman's Party.

== Suffragists ==
- Sarah Tarleton Colvin (1865–1949) – chairman of the Minnesota chapter of the National Woman's Party, arrested during the "Watchfire for Freedom" demonstrations.
- Nellie Griswold Francis (1874–1969) – founded and led the Everywoman Suffrage Club, an African-American suffragist group in Minnesota, civil rights and anti-lynching activist.
- Ella M. S. Marble (1850–1929) – physician; president of several state associations.
- Ima Winchell Stacy (1867-1923) - served on the local committee when the National American Woman Suffrage Association held its annual meeting in Minneapolis in 1901.
- Sarah Burger Stearns (1836–1904) – first president of the Minnesota Woman Suffrage Association.
- Charlotte S. Winchell (1836-1926) - civic leader; member of the Minnesota and Minneapolis Suffrage Societies
- Alice Ames Winter (1865–1944) – litterateur, author, clubwoman, suffragist.

== Suffragists campaigning in Minnesota ==
- Margaret Foley.
- Nancy Schoonmaker.
