= List of Nebraska suffragists =

This is a list of Nebraska suffragists, suffrage groups and others associated with the cause of women's suffrage in Nebraska.

== Groups ==
- Nebraska Equal Suffrage Association.

== Suffragists ==
- Mary Garard Andrews (1852–1936) – president, Nebraska Suffrage Association.
- Mamie Claflin (1867–1929) – Nebraska temperance and suffrage leader; newspaper editor and publisher.
- Mary E. Smith Hayward (1842–1938) – businesswoman; honorary president of the Nebraska Equal Suffrage Association.
- Jennie Florella Holmes (1842–1892) — temperance activist; chair, executive committee, Nebraska State Suffrage Society.
- Deborah G. King (1839–1922) – temperance activist and suffragist; vice-president for Nebraska of the NWSA.
- Minnie J Terrell Todd (1844–1929) – Nebraska suffragist.
