= List of Idaho suffragists =

This is a list of Idaho suffragists, suffrage groups and others associated with the cause of women's suffrage in Idaho.

== Suffragists ==
- May Arkwright Hutton (Wallace).

== See also ==
- List of American suffragists
