= List of Washington (state) suffragists =

This is a list of Washington (state) suffragists, suffrage groups and others associated with the cause of women's suffrage in Washington.

== Suffragists ==
- Catharine Paine Blaine (1829–1908) – suffragist, teacher, and pioneer, one of the signers of the Declaration of Sentiments
- Emma Smith DeVoe (1848–1927) – leading Washington State suffragist, founded the National Council of Women Voters.
- Helga Estby (1860–1942) – Norwegian immigrant, noted for her walk across the United States during 1896 to save her family farm.
- Linda Deziah Jennings (1870–1932) - editor of the Washington Women's Cook Book (1908).
- May Arkwright Hutton (1860–1915) – suffrage leader and labor rights advocate in the Pacific Northwest.
- Lucie Fulton Isaacs (1841–1916) — American writer, philanthropist; president of Walla Walla, Washington's suffrage association.
- Alice Sampson Presto (1879–?) – Washington state suffragist and politician.
- Lucy Robbins Messer Switzer (1844–1922) – established the suffrage movement in eastern Washington.

== Suffragists campaigning in Washington ==
- Anita Pollitzer.

== See also ==
- List of American suffragists
