= List of West Virginia suffragists =

This is a list of West Virginia suffragists, suffrage groups and others associated with the cause of women's suffrage in West Virginia.

== Suffragists ==
- Izetta Jewel (1883–1978) – stage actress, women's rights activist, politician and first woman to second the nomination of a presidential candidate at a major American political party convention.
- Livia Simpson Poffenbarger (1862–1937) – state director for the women's suffrage campaign in West Virginia.

== See also ==
- List of American suffragists
