= Branham (surname) =

Branham is a surname. Notable people with the surname include:

- Sara Branham Matthews, American microbiologist and physician
- Adelia Pope Branham (1861–1917), American writer
- Lucy Gwynne Branham, American suffragist
- Malaki Branham (born 2003), American basketball player
- William M. Branham, American Christian minister and faith healer
- George Branham III, American professional ten-pin bowler
