= Branham House =

Branham House may refer to:

- Branham House (Georgetown, Kentucky), listed on the NRHP in Scott County, Kentucky
- Richard Branham House, Midway, Kentucky, listed on the National Register of Historic Places in Scott County, Kentucky
- Timberlake-Branham House, Charlottesville, Virginia, listed on the National Register of Historic Places in Charlottesville, Virginia
