= List of Mississippi suffragists =

This is a list of Mississippi suffragists, suffrage groups and others associated with the cause of women's suffrage in Mississippi.

== Suffragists ==
- Belle Kearney (1863–1939) – speaker and lobbyist for the National American Woman Suffrage Association; first woman elected to the Mississippi State Senate.

== See also ==
- List of American suffragists
