= Costen =

Costen is both a surname and a given name. Notable people with the name include:

- Sam Costen (1882–1955), American football coach
- Costen Jordan Harrell (1885–1971), American Methodist bishop and theologian
- Costen Shockley (1942–2022), American baseball player

== See also ==
- Costen House, historic house in Pocomoke City, Maryland, United States
