= Helen Hoy Greeley =

American suffragist, lawyer and political activist

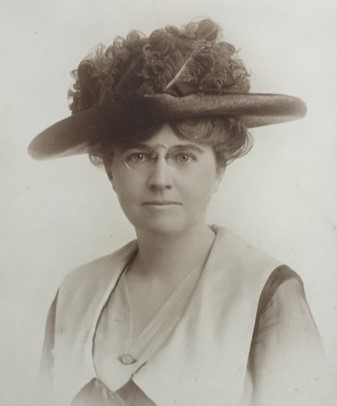
- Born: January 20, 1878; Albany
- Died: November 21, 1965 (aged 87); Charlottesville
- Occupation: Lawyer, suffragist
- Spouse(s): Harold Dudley Greeley

Helen Hoy Greeley (January 20, 1878 – November 21, 1965) was an American suffragist, lawyer, and political activist.

== Early life ==
Helen Katherine Hoy was born in Albany, New York in 1878. Her father Charles T. Hoy worked in prisons, advocated for improved sanitary conditions in prisons, and also founded libraries. Her mother Lucy M.S. Hoy graduated from Albany Normal School and worked as a public school assistant principal.

Helen Hoy attended Albany High School and then Vassar, graduating in 1899 with Phi Beta Kappa honors. After graduation she worked for three years as a teacher of Greek and English at private schools in New Jersey and New York, and East Side Evening High School for Women (New York City), before pursuing a career in law.

Hoy married attorney Harold D. Greeley on August 29, 1908.

== Legal career ==
Hoy earned a Bachelor of Laws (LLB) from New York University, graduating in 1903 at the head of her class, and was admitted to the New York Bar that same year. Along with Sarah E. Martin, she engaged in general legal practice at the firm of Hoy and Martin. In addition to general legal practice, she was one of the legal representatives of the New York Charter Revision Commission, and represented the Interborough Association of Women Teachers, the New York Committee for a State Police, and several suffrage organizations. Among her many accomplishments she drafted the law that created the New York Department of State Police, the law providing military rank to army nurses, and the regulations in Missouri that regulated nursing practice.

== Suffrage ==
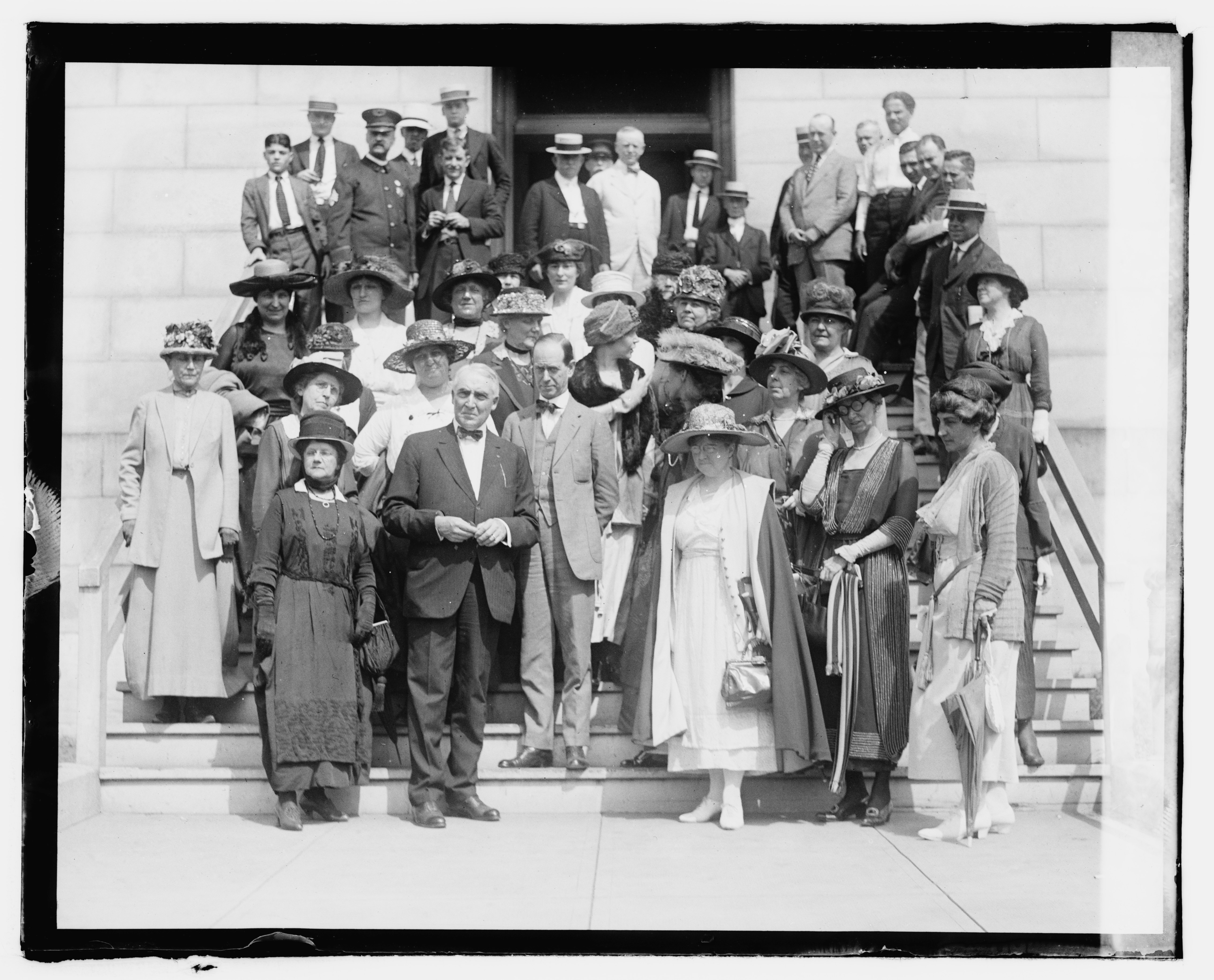
Helen Hoy Greeley is third from the right in the front row, a representative of the National Women's party posing with Senator Harding, 1920.

In January 1907, Harriot Stanton Blatch founded the Equality League of Self-Supporting Women, emphasizing a militant, aggressive form of activism in support of women's enfranchisement. Helen Hoy was an early member of this organization that sought membership from professional women like Hoy in addition to large numbers of unionized and working-class women. By 1908 the League's membership included Hoy, Charlotte Perkins Gilman, Florence Kelley, Leonora O'Reilly, Lavinia Dock, Jessie Ashley, Gertrud Barnum, Inez Milholland, and Rose Schneiderman. After the sixtieth anniversary celebration of the Seneca Falls Convention, Hoy joined a "trolley car campaign" organized by Blatch and Maud Malone, traveling throughout New York and ending near Vassar College. Led by Milholland, several members of the League including Hoy, Blatch, Gilman and Schneiderman participated in what would become an infamous pro-suffrage gathering of Vassar students at a cemetery near the campus, as the campus president had forbidden suffrage gatherings on school grounds.

Over her activist career, Helen was also a founding member of the College Equal Suffrage League of New York and the Original Woman Suffrage Party. She held leadership roles in the Nineteenth Assembly District, Borough of Brooklyn and Borough of Manhattan Woman Suffrage Parties, and served on committees of the National American Woman Suffrage Association (NAWSA). Hoy marched in the first New York suffrage parade, and is credited with beginning the practice of "intensive district street speaking, demonstrating its effectiveness by speaking 56 consecutive nights on one street corner, Ninety-sixth Street and Broadway"

In 1911 Greeley traveled throughout Sonoma, San Francisco and much of southeast California to help convince voters in previously anti-suffrage areas to support California suffrage] Greeley joined Gail Laughlin, Maud Younger, Jeannette Rankin, Margaret Haley, Alma Lafferty and other politicians and labor and suffrage activists from across the country to support the efforts in Northern California. Among her arguments for women's enfranchisement was a reminder that over 8,500 women were teachers in California, but they were unable to vote for the position of County Superintendent of Schools. In the final days of the California campaign, Greeley is credited with keeping an outdoor audience of 4,000 in good humor, while 6,000 others attended a mass meeting inside the Dreamland Rink. After women successfully won the vote in 1911, Greeley returned to California in 1912 in support of Senator La-Follette's presidential campaign.

In 1912 Greeley and Charlotte Anita Whitney of California provided support to Portland area suffrage groups, providing lectures in homes, at the Woman's Press club, and a meeting of the Portland Woman's Club Campaign Committee. As part of this visit Whitney and Greeley helped to found a Portland chapter of the College Equal Suffrage League. Greeley engaged in frequent presentations to gatherings of the Portland Equal Suffrage League, especially challenging President Roosevelt's statements and views on woman suffrage and his claims that women were not serious about the movement

In 1913 Greeley created the "Rainbow Campaign," as suffragists promoting the 1915 state vote distributed five different colored flyers to homes in New York. Although this particular campaign ultimately failed, the strategy demonstrated Greeley's creativity in obtaining attention for the cause. While she was viewed as strategic and creative, she didn't take lightly the cause she was supporting. In May 1915 the Hudson Evening Register is reported as indicating "Helen Hoy Greeley 'urged the men not to vote ‘yes’ because some pretty woman had requested them to do so, but to consider carefully the arguments of both suffragists and anti-suffragists and vote according to their honest convictions.’"

In 1914 Greeley's speaking tour took her to Dover, Delaware, serving as a keynote speaker at the annual state suffrage convention.

== Rank for nurses ==
From 1918-1920, Greeley focused her attention on obtaining rank for army nurses, arguing that this was a matter or women's dignity. Along with Harriot Stanton Blatch, Greeley organized the National Committee to Secure Rank for Army Nurses, with Blatch serving as chair of the New York section and Greeley as general secretary and legal counsel. The organization's aim was to ensure that all military nurses of any rank would be recognized as officers. In June 1918, Greeley is reported to have stated, “Under existing conditions the army nurse, trained by three years’ study and experience, has less authority on her own job than the hospital orderly of three weeks, training and less experience. Handicapped and delayed in their work by lack of authority... the army nurses here and abroad are backing a movement to obtain relative military rank.” She insisted the urgency was based on both hospital morale, respect, and efficiency of job performance (The Evening Independent June 20, 1918)”

Over time, viewed as a peer to M. Adelaide Nutting, Frances Payne Bolton and Annie W. Goodrich, Greeley was regarded as one of the most prominent activists seeking greater recognition and respect for the work of army nurses. Greeley challenged military officers and medical professionals of all sexes who claimed women neither needed nor benefited from obtaining military rank because civility prevented women from being mistreated by their male colleagues. She believed women needed to get out from under "the spell" of those who had convinced nurses they didn't deserve rank. On June 4, 1920, President Wilson signed into law the official army reorganization that provided nurses with military rank and the same social rights and privileges of other officers, but did not confer them with equal pay.

== Other activism ==
Greeley's civic engagement in New York included leadership in the City Improvement Society, the Committee of Fifty for the Removing of the Eleventh Avenue railroad tracks, and the Women's Municipal League.

Her activism related to peace and justice included word addressing amnesty for political prisoners and the need for disarmament, and activist and legal service to the NY Council for the Limitation of Armaments, the Women's Committee for World Disarmament, the Legislative Committee for the Women's International League of Peace and Freedom, and the Institute of Politics at Williams College.

After woman suffrage was obtained, Greeley moved to Milwaukee, and joined Wisconsin bar. In the late 1920s and early 1930s she served as Secretary of the Milwaukee County Branch of the League of Nations, especially addressing issues of disarmament. She retired in the 1940s as senior solicitor for the U.S. Department of the Interior.”

== Publications ==
Greeley, H. H. (1898). The Life and Legal Influence of David Dudley Field.

Greeley, H. H. (1919). Rank for nurses. American Journal of Nursing, 19, 840–851.

Greeley, H. H. (1920). Rank for Nurses: The Present Situation. American Journal of Nursing, 20(9), 736-736.
