= D. Hopper Emory =

American politician (1841–1916)

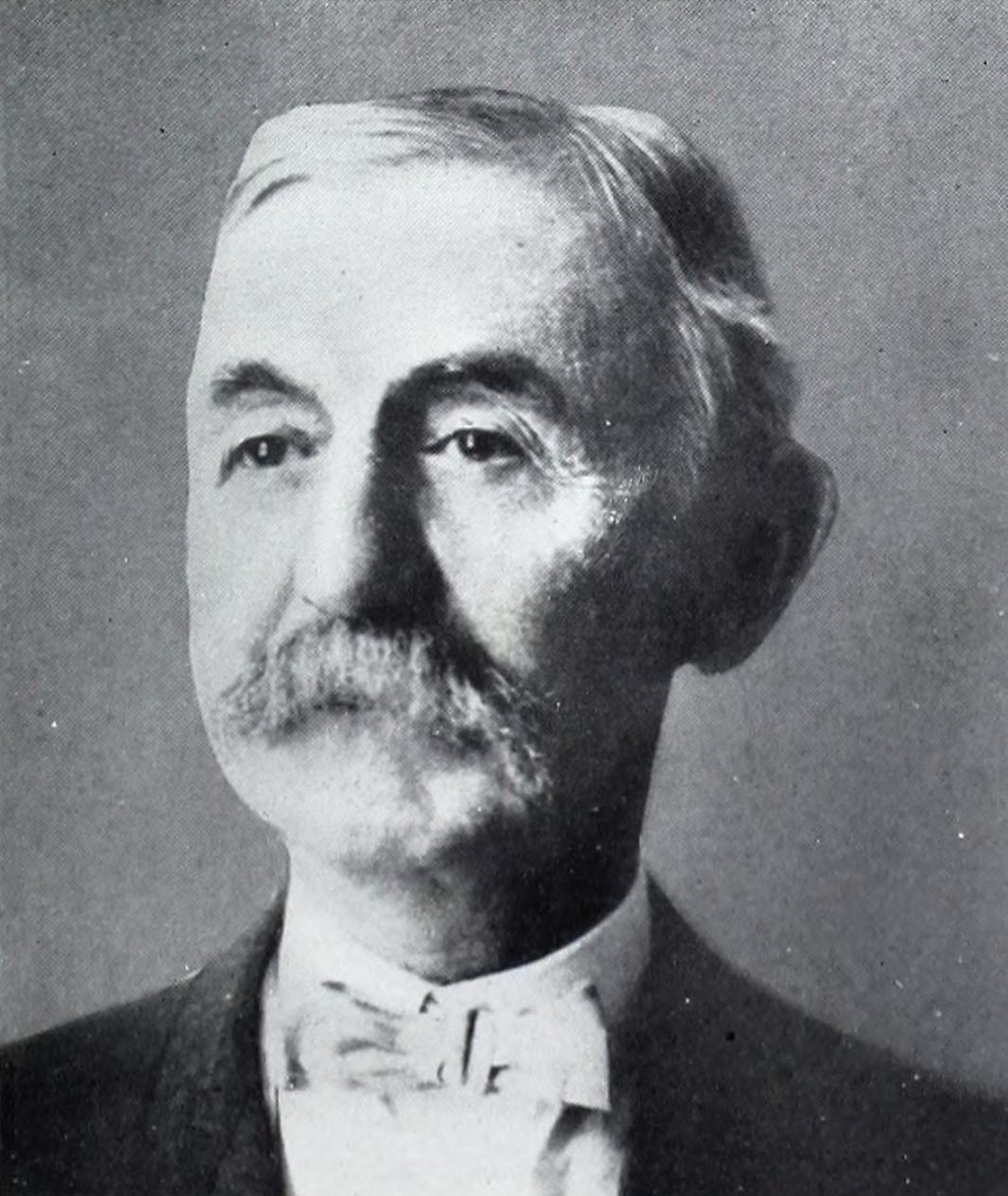
- Emory in 1914 publication

Member of Maryland Senate
- In office 1896–1900
- Preceded by: John Hubner
- Succeeded by: John Hubner

Personal details
- Born: Daniel Hopper Emory; February 14, 1841 Centreville, Maryland, U.S.
- Died: February 27, 1916 (aged 75) Baltimore, Maryland, U.S.
- Resting place: Green Mount Cemetery; Baltimore, Maryland, U.S.
- Party: Republican
- Spouse: Julia May Ridgely (m. 1879)
- Children: 6, including Julia Ridgely

Daniel Hopper Emory (February 14, 1841 – February 27, 1916), better known as D. Hopper Emory, was an American politician. He served as a member of the Maryland Senate, representing Baltimore County, from 1896 to 1900.

== Early life ==
Daniel Hopper Emory was born on February 14, 1841, in Centreville, Maryland, to Frances A. (née Wilby) and D. C. H. Emory. His father was a judge of the Baltimore County Circuit Court. The family moved to Baltimore County in 1842. Emory attended Dalrymple's Academy or Newton Academy, Rugby Institute and Mount Washington. He was tutored by Dr. Edwin Arnold. He studied law with his father. He was admitted to the bar in 1866.

== Career ==
Emory practiced law in Baltimore County. Emory was a Republican. He was a candidate for judge in 1888. He served as commissioner of chancery of the Baltimore County Court for fifteen years. He served as a member of the Maryland Senate, representing Baltimore County, from 1896 to 1900.

Emory served as director and secretary of the board of the Female House of Refuge. He was board of governor of the Oratorio Society.

== Personal life ==
Emory married Julia May Ridgely on November 13, 1879. He had three sons and three daughters, including Frank W., Charles Ridgely, Sara S., Julia Ridgely and Elizabeth O. His daughter Julia Ridgely was a suffragist.

Emory was a member of St. John's Methodist Episcopal Church in Lutherville. Emory died on February 27, 1916, at his home at 17 East 22nd Street in Baltimore. He was buried at Green Mount Cemetery in Baltimore.
