= Stephen Barnham =

English politician

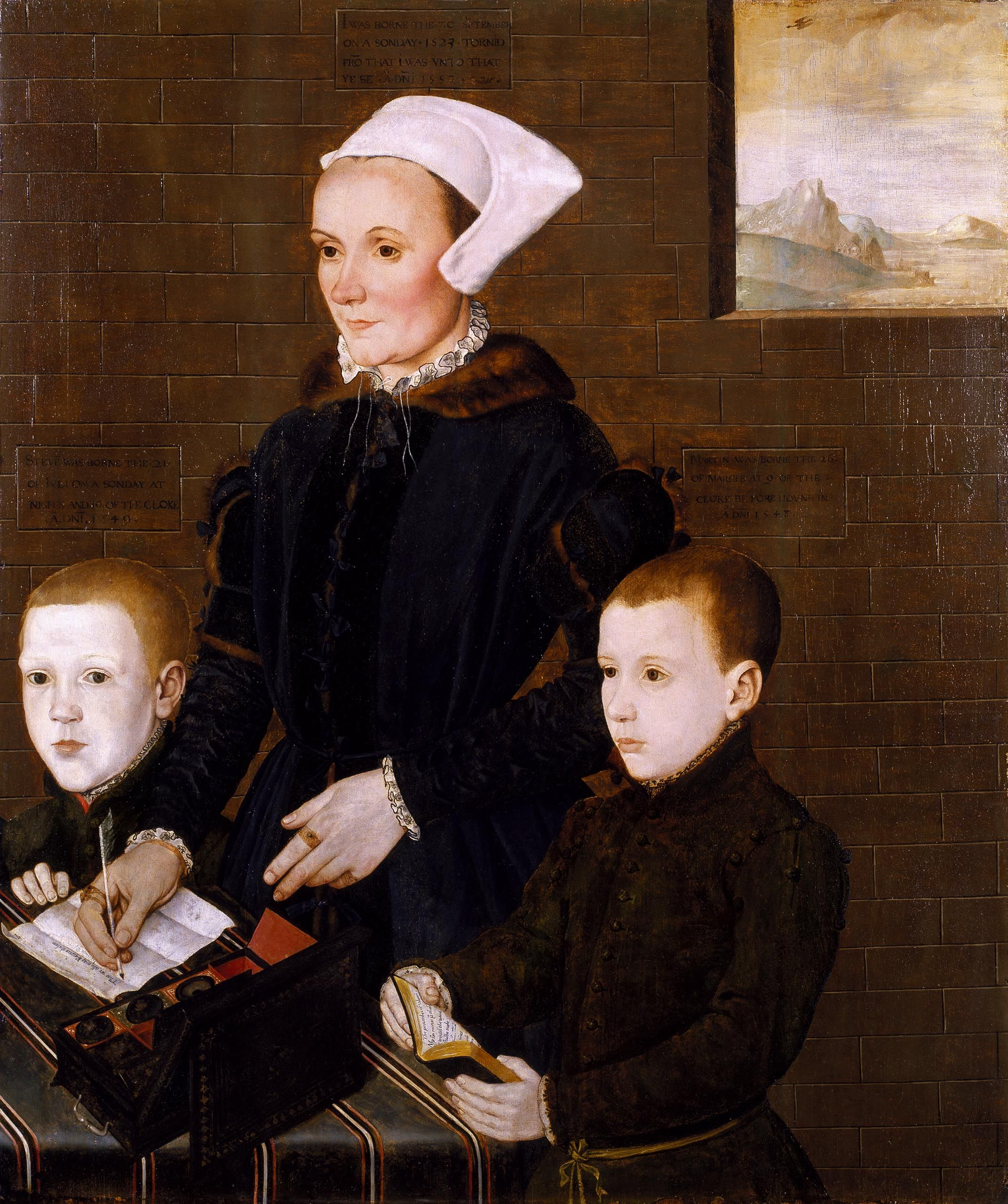
Alice Barnham Portrait

Stephen Barnham (died 1608), of London, Denne, Horsham and later of Southover, near Lewes, Sussex, was an English politician.

He was a member (MP) of the parliament of England for Chichester in 1601.
