= Edith Cherry Johnson =

American journalist (1879–1961)

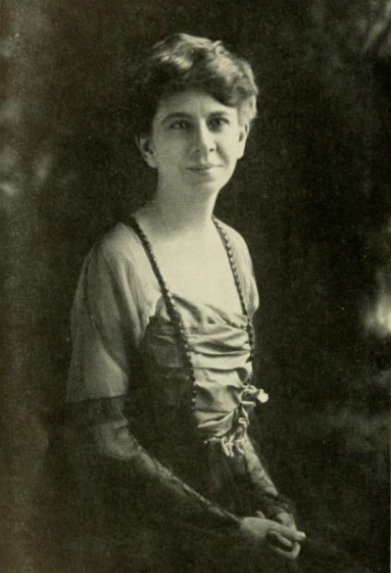
- Johnson in 1920
- Born: November 11, 1879; New Lexington, Ohio, U.S.
- Died: March 11, 1961 (aged 81); Oklahoma City, Oklahoma, U.S.
- Occupation: Journalist
- Known for: Society editor for The Daily Oklahoman for 50 years; Member of the Oklahoma Hall of Fame and Oklahoma Journalism Hall of Fame
- Notable work: Illusions and Disillusions (1920) and To Women of the Business World (1923)

Edith Cherry Johnson (November 11, 1879 – March 11, 1961) was an American journalist who was the society editor for The Daily Oklahoman between 1908 and 1958. For her journalism she was inducted into the Oklahoma Hall of Fame in 1935 and posthumously inducted into the Oklahoma Journalism Hall of Fame in 1997.

== Biography ==
Edith Cherry Johnson was born on November 11, 1879, in New Lexington, Ohio to Smith L. Johnson and Mary Caroline Hatcher. She attended the Miss Phelps's English and Classical School for Young Ladies and Ohio State University. She dropped out of university after the death of her mother and moved to Oklahoma City in 1903 alongside her father and three younger sisters. In 1908, after her father's death, she was hired by The Daily Oklahoman's E. K. Gaylord and Roy Stafford. Johnson never married or had children and, according to the Encyclopedia of Oklahoma History and Culture, was a voice of "traditional domesticity" in Oklahoma.

Johnson served as the society editor until her retirement in 1958. She also wrote two non-fiction books, Illusions and Disillusions (1920) and To Women of the Business World (1923), in addition to serialized romance novels. She was the first woman named an honorary member of the Junior Chamber of Commerce and a founder of Oklahoma City's Goodwill Industries. In 1935, she was inducted into the Oklahoma Hall of Fame and given an honorary doctorate in literature from Oklahoma City University. In 1948, she was Oklahoma City’s Woman of the Year, and in 1949 she was the Oklahoma City Business and Professional Women’s Club of Oklahoma City Woman of the Year.

She died in Oklahoma City on March 11, 1961. She was posthumously inducted into the Oklahoma Journalism Hall of Fame in 1997. Her articles, personal correspondence, and other papers are held in the University of Oklahoma's western history collection.
