= List of Puerto Rico suffragists =

This is a list of Puerto Rico suffragists, suffrage groups and others associated with the cause of women's suffrage in Puerto Rico.

== Groups ==
- Puerto Rican Association of Women Suffragists (Asociación Puertorriqueña de Mujeres Sufragistas).

== Suffragists ==
- Isabel Andreu de Aguilar (1887–1948).
- Rosario Bellber González (1881–1948) – educator, social worker, women's rights activist, suffragist, and philanthropist; president of the Social League of Suffragists of Puerto Rico.

== See also ==
- Women's suffrage in states of the United States
- Women's suffrage in the United States
