= Jean Coston Maloney =

American pianist (1916–1968)

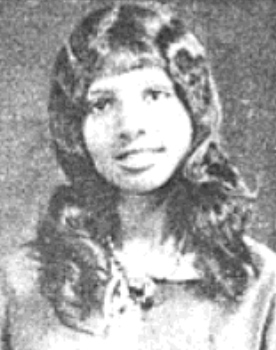
- Jean Coston, later Maloney, from a 1929 publication
- Born: Jean Elizabeth Coston; May 10, 1916; Indianapolis, Indiana, U.S.
- Died: April 20, 1968 (aged 51); Chicago, Illinois, U.S.
- Burial place: Crown Hill Cemetery and Arboretum, Section 98, Lot 1175; 39.8140797°N 86.1705552°W
- Other name: Jean Lee
- Occupations: Pianist, music educator
- Parent: Frances Berry Coston

Jean Elizabeth Coston Maloney (May 10, 1916 – April 20, 1968) also known as Jean Lee, was an American pianist and music teacher. She taught piano at Howard University, Spelman College, Dillard University and Lincoln University. Her students included musicologist Geneva Handy Southall and jazz pianist Ellis Marsalis Jr.

== Early life and education ==
Coston was born in Indianapolis, the daughter of George Ellsworth Coston and Frances Berry Coston. Her mother was a journalist and educator. She attended Attucks High School, and graduated from Oberlin Conservatory of Music. She also studied with Carl Friedberg at the Juilliard School. She was a member of Delta Sigma Theta.

== Career ==
Coston played for national meetings of the NAACP and the National Association of Negro Musicians as a child. She was mentioned in The Crisis when she was twelve years old, after she was a finalist in a statewide piano competition in Indiana. At age 18, she taught music appreciation at an Indianapolis summer school sponsored by the YWCA.

Coston gave recitals in Atlanta in 1940, and in Knoxville in 1941. "Miss Coston displayed a pleasing tone, dexterity, and fine shading," wrote Atlanta critic Gamewell Valentine in 1940. She also performed in radio broadcasts. In 1949 and 1953, she was guest soloist with the New Orleans Symphony Orchestra, playing for a non-segregated audience.

Coston taught piano at Spelman College in 1939, and Howard University in Washington, D.C., Dillard University in New Orleans and at Lincoln University in Pennsylvania, all historically black schools (HBCUs). Her students included Ellis Marsalis Jr., who studied with her from 1950 to 1951, and Geneva Handy Southall (at Dillard).

== Personal life ==
Coston married physician Arnold Hamilton Maloney Jr. in 1942. They had three children. She died in 1968, at the age of 51, in Chicago. There is a scrapbook of her correspondence and ephemera in the Western Michigan University Archives & Regional History Collections.
