= Carrie Barnes Ross =

American suffragist

- Born: 1880s Kentucky, U.S.
- Died: April 26, 1918; Boston, Massachusetts, U.S.
- Occupations: Suffragist, educator

Carolyn V. "Carrie" Barnes Ross (1880s – April 26, 1918) was an American educator and suffragist, based in Indianapolis. She was founding president of Branch No. 7, a chapter of the Equal Suffrage League of Indiana.

== Early life and education ==
Carolyn (or Caroline) V. Barnes was born in Kentucky in the 1880s to Charles Henry Barnes and Lillie Peters Barnes. She was raised by her widowed mother and maternal grandmother in Denver, Colorado. She graduated from Denver High School in 1902, and from Teachers College, Columbia University in 1905.

== Career ==
Barnes taught at Tuskegee Institute for three years after college. In 1908 she moved to Indianapolis and taught school in the segregated schools of the Indianapolis Public School District. She was active in the leadership for the Camp Fire girls and secretary of the Indianapolis chapter of the NAACP. She gave addresses at church and community events, and hosted meetings of a literary society in her home.

Barnes attended a 1912 woman's suffrage meeting at the home of Madam C. J. Walker, organized by attorney Freeman Briley Ransom. Ross was elected president of the resulting group, which was known as Branch No. 7 of the Equal Suffrage League of Indiana. "We all feel that colored women have need for the ballot that white women have, and a great many needs that they have not," she wrote of their work. For four years she worked for suffrage in Indianapolis's Black community. She often spoke at events with fellow teacher Frances Berry Coston.

== Personal life and legacy ==
Barnes married a dentist, Hubert Heaton Washington Ross, in 1916, and moved to Boston with him. She died shortly after giving birth to her son in 1918, in her thirties, in Boston. In January 2020, she was recognized by Congresswoman Susan Brooks on the floor of the United States House of Representatives for her suffrage work in Indiana. In 2023, her image was included in a new mural at Indianapolis's Bicentennial Unity Plaza.
