= Timberlake–Branham House =

Historic house in Virginia, United States

- U.S. National Register of Historic Places
- Virginia Landmarks Register
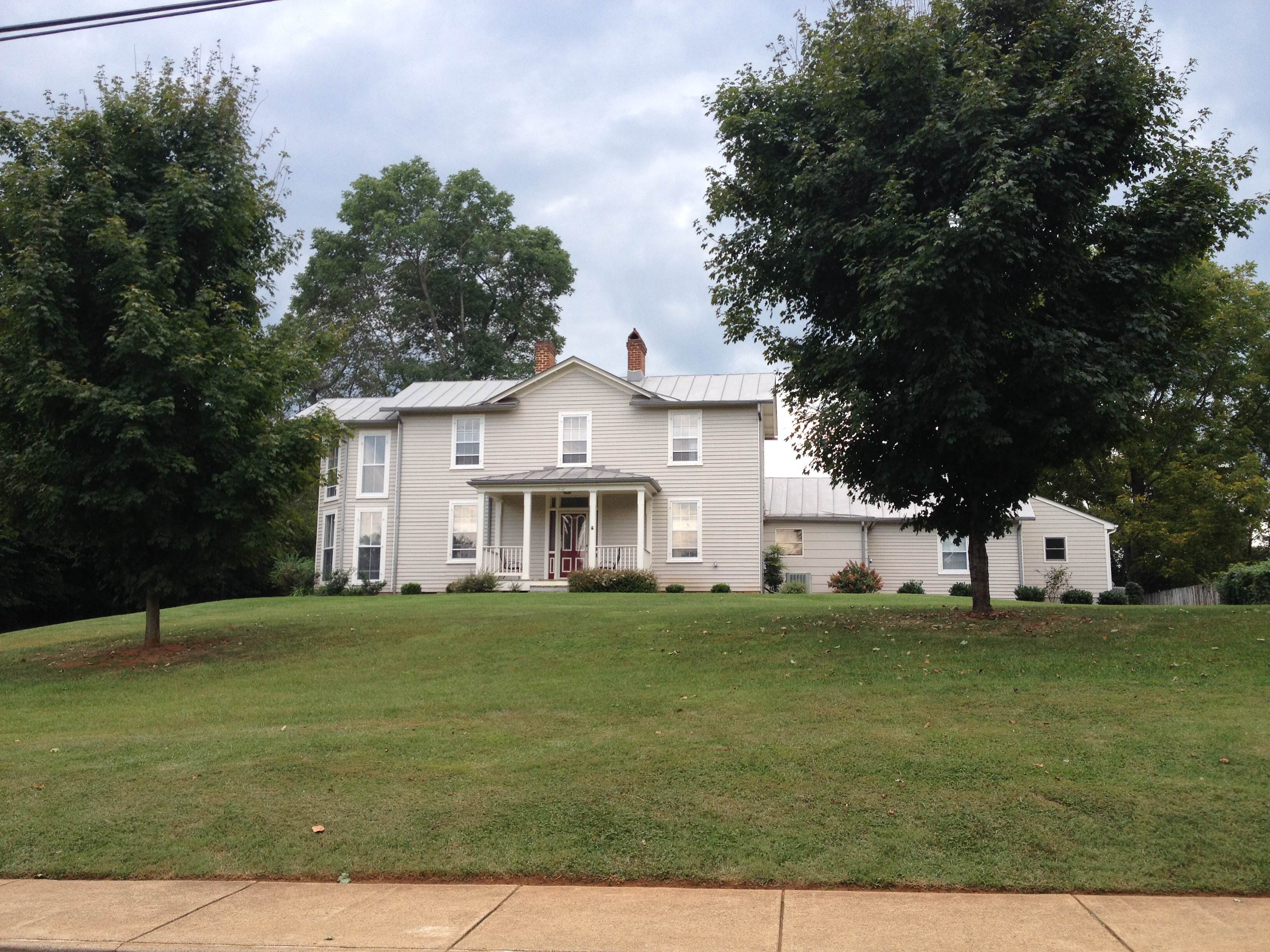

- Location within Virginia Location within the United States
- Location: 1512 E. Market St., Charlottesville, Virginia
- Coordinates: 38°1′25″N 78°27′46″W
- Area: 7.7 acres (3.1 ha)
- Built: 1886
- Architectural style: I-House
- MPS: Charlottesville MRA
- NRHP reference No.: 84003525
- VLR No.: 104-0232

Significant dates
- Added to NRHP: January 10, 1984
- Designated VLR: October 20, 1981

The Timberlake–Branham House is a historic home located in Charlottesville, Virginia. It was built in 1886, and is a two-story, three-bay, single-pile I-house dwelling. It is sheathed in weatherboard and sits on a low brick foundation. It features a two-story semi-octagonal addition at the eastern end and a wing at the southwestern rear corner. The house is occupied by the Dabney Foundation for Elders.

It was listed on the National Register of Historic Places in 1984.
