= Minnie J. Terrell Todd =

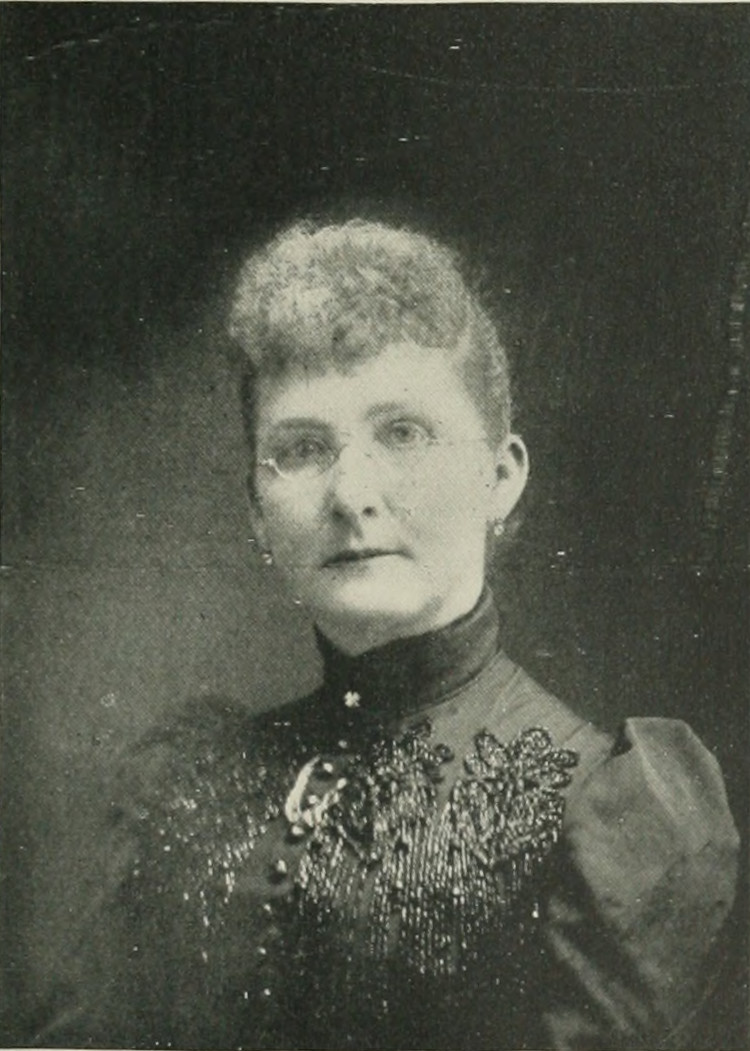
- Born: Minnie J. Terrell; November 26, 1844; Lewiston, New York, US
- Died: January 20, 1929 (aged 84)
- Resting place: Milford, Nebraska, US
- Spouse: Davison Todd (m. 1865; died 1920)

Minnie J. Terrell Todd (1844-1929) was active in the suffrage movement in Nebraska.

== Life ==
Todd née Terrell was born on November 26, 1844, in Lewiston, New York. Her parents were abolitionists. In 1865 she married Davison Todd with whom she had one child.

The couple settled in Nebraska where Todd became involved in the suffrage movement. Todd was also active in other reform efforts including literary and art clubs.

Terrell died on January 20, 1929, and was buried in Milford, Nebraska.

== Legacy ==
Terrell was included in the 1893 publication A Woman of the Century.

== See also ==
- List of suffragists and suffragettes
