= Nettie L. White =

American stenographer and suffragist (c. 1850–1921)

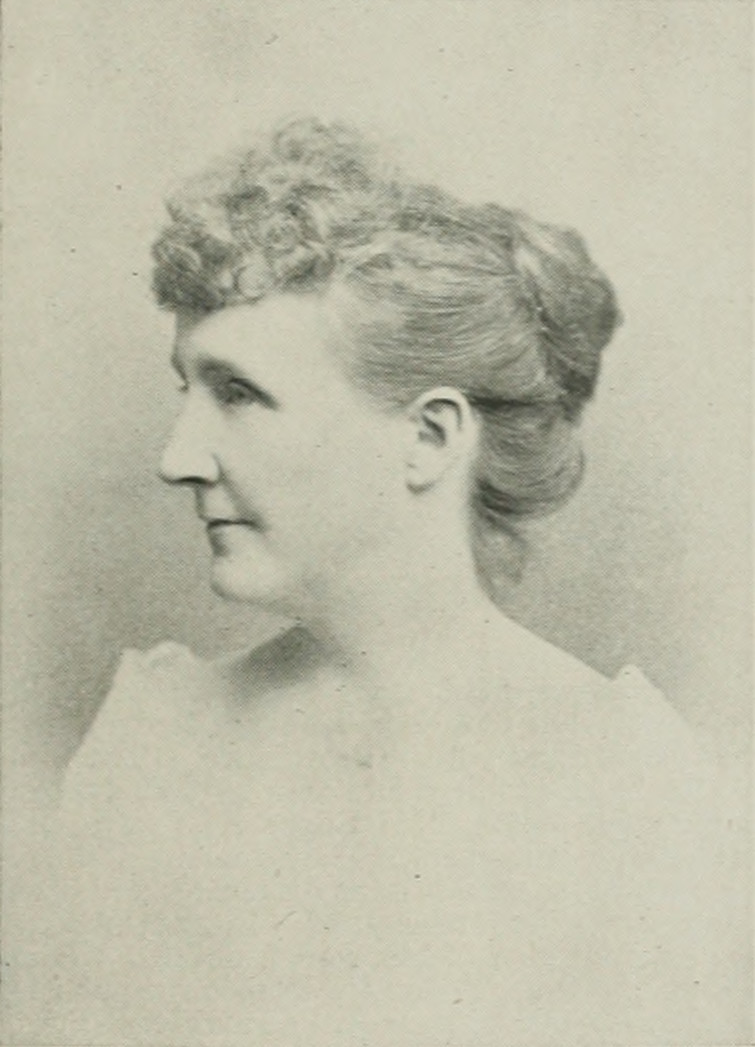
- Photo in A Woman of the Century
- Born: Nettie L. (Lovisa or Louisa) White c. 1850; Northern New York
- Died: January 12/13, 1921; Washington, D.C., U.S.
- Occupations: suffragist; stenographer

Nettie L. White (c. 1850 – January 12/13, 1921) was an American suffragist and pioneer stenographer in Washington, D.C. She was one of the most active and ardent woman suffragists in Washington, serving as president of the District of Columbia Woman Suffrage Association, the oldest suffrage organization in the world. White was the only woman of the three official stenographers in the United States Bureau of Pensions, and the first woman ever appointed directly to a US$1,600/year position in the government service.

== Early life and education ==
Nettie L. (Lovisa or Louisa) White was born in Northern New York c. 1850. Her great-grandfather served in the Revolutionary War with the Massachusetts troops. On her mother's side, she was connected with the Morses, from whom she inherited the persistent industry and independence which moved her in young womanhood to seek some means of earning her own living. After much consideration and at the suggestion of a friend, she procured Pitman's Manual of Phonography and went to work studying it without a teacher. The study was difficult, but her ambition kept her at it.

== Career ==
About 1876, when her first regular work began with Henry G. Haves, of the corps of stenographers of the House of Representatives, in Washington, D.C., women engaged in practical stenography in Washington could be counted on the fingers of one hand, and upon them fell the burden of introducing woman into a profession till then occupied entirely by men. In her extended congressional work of 13 years, she appreciated the responsibilities of the situation, beyond merely doing the work well, in establishing a new field of labor for women, always insisting that, while she might not go upon the public platform and plead and argue for financial independence for womankind, she could help supply the statistics of what had been successfully done for the use of those who would speak.

After several years of most difficult and rapid dictation work in the Capitol, she became ambitious to try her skill in the committees of Congress, but the conservative controlling powers there felt it would be most unbecoming for her to do what no woman had ever done before. So she had to wait till one day when the committees in session outnumbered the official force, and a newly arrived authority gave her the satisfaction of choosing which committee she would undertake. She decided upon the committee of military affairs. General William Rosecrans, the chairman, being a genial man, she thought he would be less likely than the others to object to the radical change in having a woman reporting the grave and weighty proceedings under his charge. And so it turned out. After a few questions, he seemed resigned. In her choice of chairman, she had neglected the selection of matter to be reported, and she was obliged to plunge into the obscurity of "heavy ordnance", just as fast as General Benet saw fit to proceed. She presented her report, it was accepted, and the bill was approved just the same as though she had been a man, except that the manuscript was first thoroughly examined.

Constant application to her business finally affected her health, so that she was obliged to seek rest and seek a change of climate. She spent one winter in Los Angeles, California, which was helpful. The year after her return, her friend, Clara Barton, asked her services during the relief work of the Red Cross in Johnstown, Pennsylvania. It was while there that she received her appointment, through civil service examination, from the Pension Bureau, going in as an expert workman on a salary of US$1,600 per year.

== Later life ==
Seeking to improve her health, White spent the winter of 1900–01 in Florida and then a month in Pinehurst, North Carolina before returning to Washington, D.C. by May 1901.

In 1904, White attended the Berlin congress of the International Council of Women. In May 1911, White sailed for Stockholm, as a delegate to the International Woman Suffrage Alliance (June 1911), which was founded in 1904 at the Berlin congress of the International Council of Women. After the conference, she continued her travels through Denmark, Norway, Sweden, Finland, Russia, and on to England. She was at home at The Cairo in 1913, and by 1914, she spoke on peace while serving as president of the District of Columbia Woman Suffrage Association, the oldest suffrage organization in the world.

White died at the National Homeopathic Hospital, Washington, D.C., January 12/13, 1921.
