= Anna E. Hendley =

American suffragist

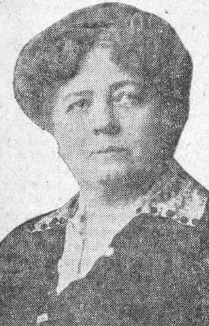
- Anna E. Hendley, from a 1917 publication.
- Born: Anna Elizabeth Mills; September 1865; Washington, D.C.
- Died: October 9, 1945 (aged 80); Washington, D.C.
- Occupations: Suffragist, clubwoman

Anna E. Hendley (September 1865 – October 9, 1945), born Anna Elizabeth Mills, was an American suffragist, founder and leader of the Anthony League, later the Susan B. Anthony Foundation.

== Early life ==
Anna Elizabeth Mills was born and raised in Washington, D.C., one of the six daughters of Sarah F. Sydnor Mills (1848–1924) and Albert W. Mills Sr. (1841–1885).

== Career ==
In 1912, Hendley founded the Anthony League to preserve the history of the woman's suffrage movement, and to build support for a memorial to Susan B. Anthony in Washington, D.C. The group also took positions on education, child labor, marriage laws, and prison reform. During World War I, she led the group's knitting drive for the troops. She was president of the organization for fourteen years; it changed its name to the Susan B. Anthony Foundation in 1925.

Hendley was also a founder and officer of the Society of Natives of the District of Columbia. and the first president of the District of Columbia Woman's Suffrage Association. In 1916, she co-founded a chautauqua series in Atlantic City. After suffrage was won, Hendley turned her attention the District of Columbia voting rights, hoping to win the vote for residents of the District. "I have seen so many seemingly impossible suffrage hopes and desires come true in my lifetime that my faith is as great as my hope," she told an interviewer in 1938.

Hendley owned Susan B. Anthony's gavel, given to her by Lucy Anthony at a victory convention in Chicago in 1920. She also owned a large 1890 portrait of Anthony by S. Jerome Uhl, and hung it at the Foundation's headquarters in the Shoreham Hotel. The painting was presented to the League of Women Voters by 1932, and to Woodrow Wilson High School in 1938; it has since disappeared.

== Personal life ==
Anna Elizabeth Mills married federal employee Julian Paul Hendley in 1882. They had three children, Marion (1883–1929), Albert (1885–1975), and Victor (1890–1896). She was widowed in 1943, after 61 years of marriage, and she died in 1945, aged 80 years, in Washington, D.C.
