= Mary Garard Andrews =

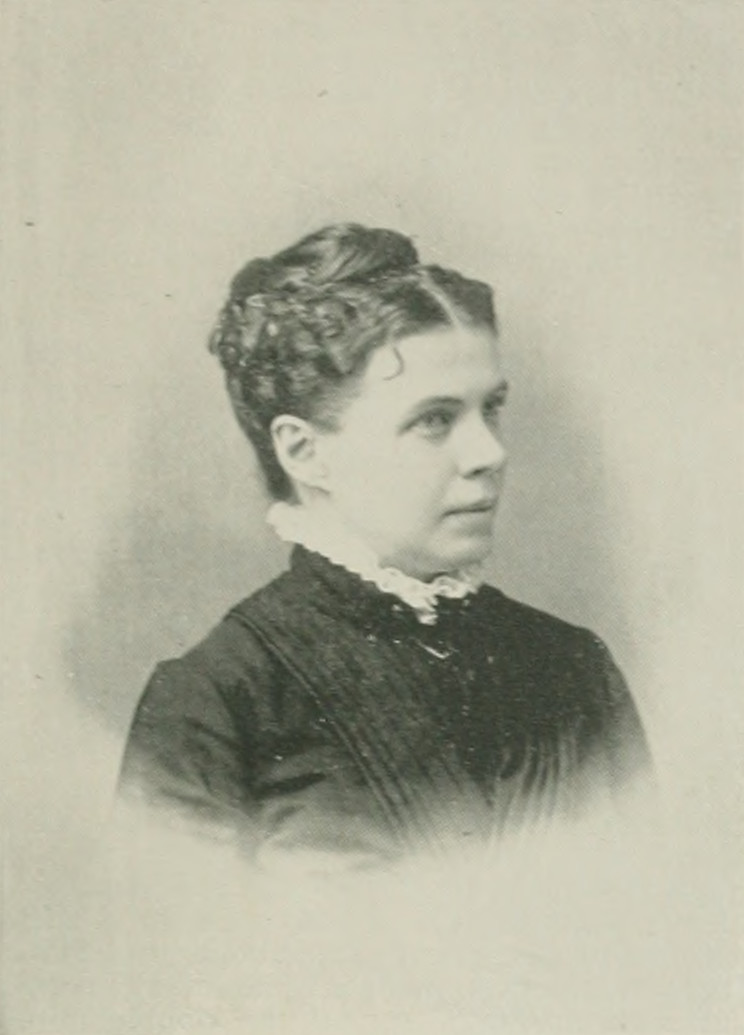
"A Woman of the Century"

Mary Garard Andrews (1852–1936) was an American Universalist minister and suffragist.

== Early life and education ==
Mary Garard was born in Clarksburg, Virginia (present-day West Virginia) on 3 March 1852. She was of Pennsylvanian stock, in whom the Quaker and Baptist blood mingled. She was "fondly proud" of the home of her adoption, Iowa. She was left motherless at the age of five and her father was killed in the service of his country a few years later.

She overcame many difficulties in acquiring an education. In spite of ill health, the discouragement of friends and financial pressure, she maintained her independence and kept herself in school for eight years. She spent two years in the academy in Washington, Iowa, three years in the Iowa State Industrial College, and three years in Hillsdale College, Michigan.

== Career ==
While in the last-named place, she completed the English Theological course with several elective studies, having charge of one or two churches all the time and preaching twice every Sunday during the three years. She says: "I never spent much time over the oft controverted question, 'Shall woman preach?' I thought the most satisfactory solution of the problem would be for woman quietly, without ostentation or controversy, to assume her place and let her work speak for itself." After five years of faithful, fruitful service in the Free Baptist Church, convictions of truth and duty caused her to sever ties and cast her lot with another church. For eight years she was engaged in the regular pastoral work of the Universalist Church, during which time she was a close and thorough student, keeping well informed on the questions of the day. Never satisfied with present attainments, she pursued a more advanced theological and philosophical course, in which she passed an examination and received the degree of BD from Lombard University, Illinois.

She was an enthusiastic temperance and Grand Army worker, and for two years was National Chaplain of the Woman's Relief Corps.

Andrews served as president of the Nebraska Suffrage Association.

== Personal life ==
In April, 1885, she married I. R. Andrews, a prosperous attorney of Omaha, Nebraska, where she lived. She died on September 25, 1936, in Minneapolis, Minnesota and was interred at the Prospect Hill Cemetery in Omaha, Nebraska.
