= Julia Emory =

American suffragist

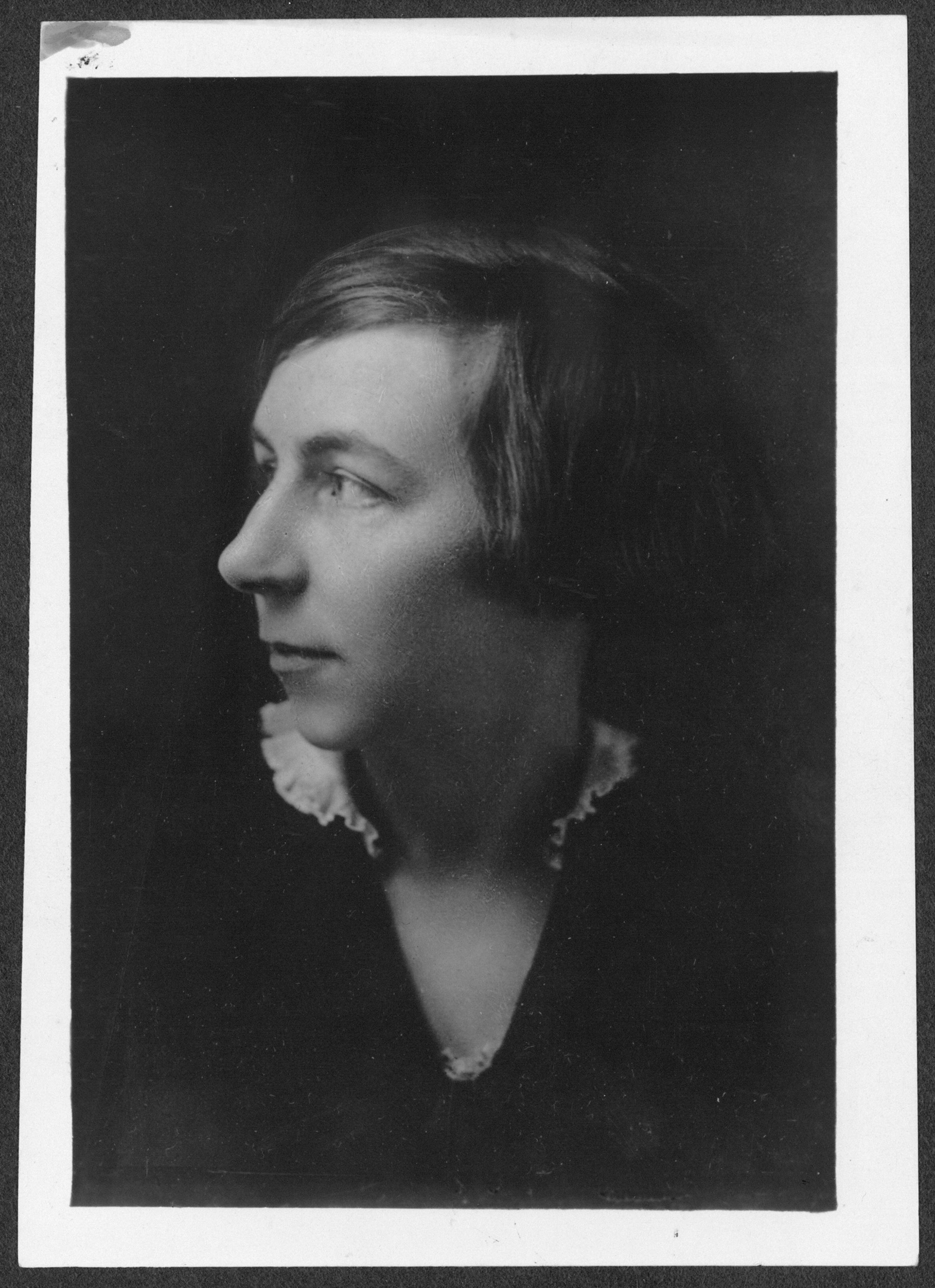
Suffragist leader Julia Emory.

Julia Ridgely Emory (May 4, 1885 – February 1, 1979) was an American suffragist from Maryland, who led protests in Washington, D.C., for women's right to vote.

== Biography ==
Julia Emory was born in Baltimore, Maryland, in 1885. Her parents were Daniel Hopper Emory, a Maryland state senator with the Republican Party, and Julia Ridgely Emory. She graduated in 1902 from Western High School.

Passionate about women's rights, Emory joined the Women's Trade Union League, a labor organization that brought together working-class and upper-class women. However, in 1917, she left the organization to focus her efforts on women's suffrage. She became very active in the National Woman's Party, including through writing articles for its publication The Suffragist.

She began attending protests at the White House and Congress in Washington, D.C., alongside such activists as Doris Stevens, Lucy Burns, and Alice Paul, with whom she became particularly close. While small in stature, Emory was a fierce activist, described as "active, insistent, and persistent in inverse ratio to [her] size" by her contemporary Inez Haynes Irwin. She was arrested thirty-four times in total and frequently held at the Occoquan Workhouse, with her first arrest coming on September 8, 1917. After conducting a hunger strike at the workhouse during her detention in November 1917, holding her hands aloft overnight in solidarity with the chained Lucy Burns on the "Night of Terror" there, she became an organizer for the National Woman's Party. In that capacity, she helped launch the "watchfires of freedom" campaign, in which activists burned copies of President Woodrow Wilson's speeches outside the White House. She was also dispatched to Maine and Pennsylvania to lobby for the 19th Amendment, which would give women the right to vote across the country. In October and November 1919, she led a picket of the Capitol to attract attention and support for the amendment, during which she was injured multiple times by police.

After the amendment was enacted in 1920, Emory largely retired from political activism. She died in 1979 at age 93.

== See also ==
- Silent Sentinels
