= Gertrude Barnum =

- Born: September 29, 1866; Chester, Illinois
- Died: June 17, 1948 (aged 81); California
- Occupations: Social Worker, Labor Organizer

Gertrude Barnum (September 29, 1866–June 17, 1948) was an American social worker and labor organizer.

== Early life ==
Barnum was born in Chester, Illinois, but she grew up in the Chicago area. Her father was an attorney and a Cook County judge, and her family was part of the city's upper class. Barnum attended Evanston Township High School and the University of Wisconsin, but dropped out after her first year at the university. After returning to Chicago, she took part in the city's social reform movement and became a social worker in the city's settlement houses. She worked as an apprentice at Hull House during the 1890s before becoming the head worker at the Henry Booth House in 1902.

== Trade unionism ==
Barnum's experience as a social worker led her to join the labor movement, as she felt that it was the best path to improve the lives of those who depended on the settlement houses. She joined the National Women's Trade Union League (WTUL) shortly after it was founded in 1903, and soon became a national organizer for the union. She supervised strikes in various industries in Fall River, Massachusetts, Troy, New York, and Aurora, Illinois in 1905; over the next several years, she continued to supervise strikes nationwide, mainly in the garment industry. As a member of the upper class, Barnum was able to use her status to secure the support of other upper-class citizens to the cause of labor; during a 1913 strike in New York City, she even convinced Theodore Roosevelt to publicly support striking garment workers.

Barnum's background occasionally caused tension with the working-class women of the labor movement, however. In particular, she feuded with Leonora O'Reilly, an early member of the WTUL who resigned in 1905 due to her dissatisfaction with upper-class allies within the organization. After O'Reilly's resignation, Barnum rebuked her for leaving an organization which she felt was continuing to do good work despite her criticisms. O'Reilly also criticized a book on the working class which Barnum had praised, claiming that it was an inaccurate depiction of the actual lives of working-class women. Barnum replied in a letter written on WTUL stationery, from which she had crossed out O'Reilly's name; while she admitted that O'Reilly may have been right about the book, she continued to criticize her for leaving the league.

== Advisory roles ==
In 1914, Barnum took up a position with the newly created United States Commission on Industrial Relations. By the end of the decade, she had become the assistant director of the Department of Labor's investigation service. She also joined the Equality League of Self-Supporting Women, an organization founded by Harriot Stanton Blatch to advance the women's suffrage movement. In 1919, she retired and moved to California, where she lived until her death in 1948.
