= Frances Berry Coston =

American journalist

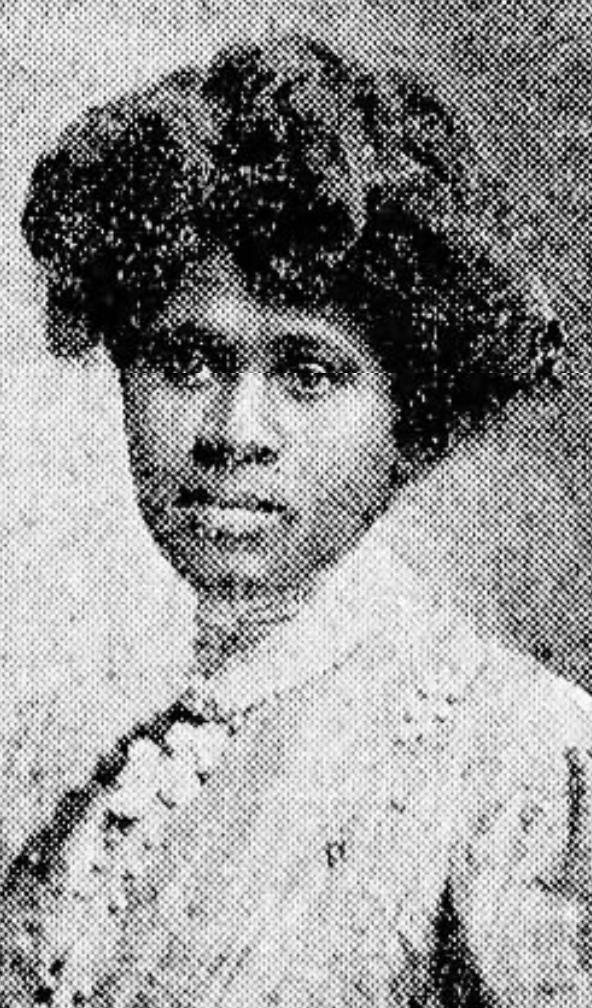
- Frances Berry Coston, from a 1909 publication
- Born: Frances Berry; March 1, 1876; Rockholds, Kentucky, U.S.
- Died: July 19, 1960 (age 84); Chicago, Illinois, U.S.
- Occupation(s): Journalist, publicist, suffragist, educator
- Children: 3, including Jean Coston Maloney

Frances M. Berry Coston (March 1, 1876 – July 19, 1960) was an American journalist, publicist, suffragist, and educator based in Indianapolis.

== Early life and education ==
Berry was born in Rockholds, Kentucky, the daughter of James Berry and Mary Berry. She graduated from Berea College and from the Pulitzer School of Journalism at Columbia University. She also studied at the University of Chicago, Butler University, Indiana University, and Harvard University.

== Career ==
Coston taught at Kentucky State College, and in the segregated elementary schools of Indianapolis. She was principal of the elementary school at the Indianapolis Asylum for Friendless Colored Children for five years. In the 1920s she was founder and president of the Educational Aid Society, to "free children from oppression, ignorance and vice," by raising funds for residents of the orphanage to attend high school and college. She retired from schoolwork in 1951, in her seventies.

Coston became a correspondent and book reviewer for the Indianapolis News in 1912, while still teaching school. "Because of her unusual efficiency and versatile abilities as a writer, she is permitted by the editorial staff to turn out articles on any subject or along any literary line she may desire," noted one profile in 1921. She wrote about education and Black women's activism, including suffrage work.

In 1912, Coston attended a women's suffrage meeting at the home of Madame C. J. Walker; she worked with fellow teacher Carrie Barnes Ross organizing suffrage events. She was an active member of the Women's Improvement Club, the YWCA, the Flanner Guild, and her church. She volunteered as a probation officer in Marion County. During World War I, she was appointed by the War Department as publicity director for "colored women's war work" in Indiana, and hosted an Indianapolis appearance by national women's war work leader Alice Dunbar Nelson. In the 1920s, she was publicity chair of the Negro Women's National Republican League in Indiana, and served as publicity chair for the Indiana Federation of Colored Women's Clubs for several decades.

== Personal life ==
Berry married George Ellsworth Coston in 1916. They had three children; their daughter Jean Coston Maloney (also known as Jean Lee) became a noted pianist and music educator. Her husband died in 1949, and she died in 1960, at the age of 84, at her daughter's home in Chicago.
