= Lucy Gwynne Branham =

American suffragist (1892–1966)

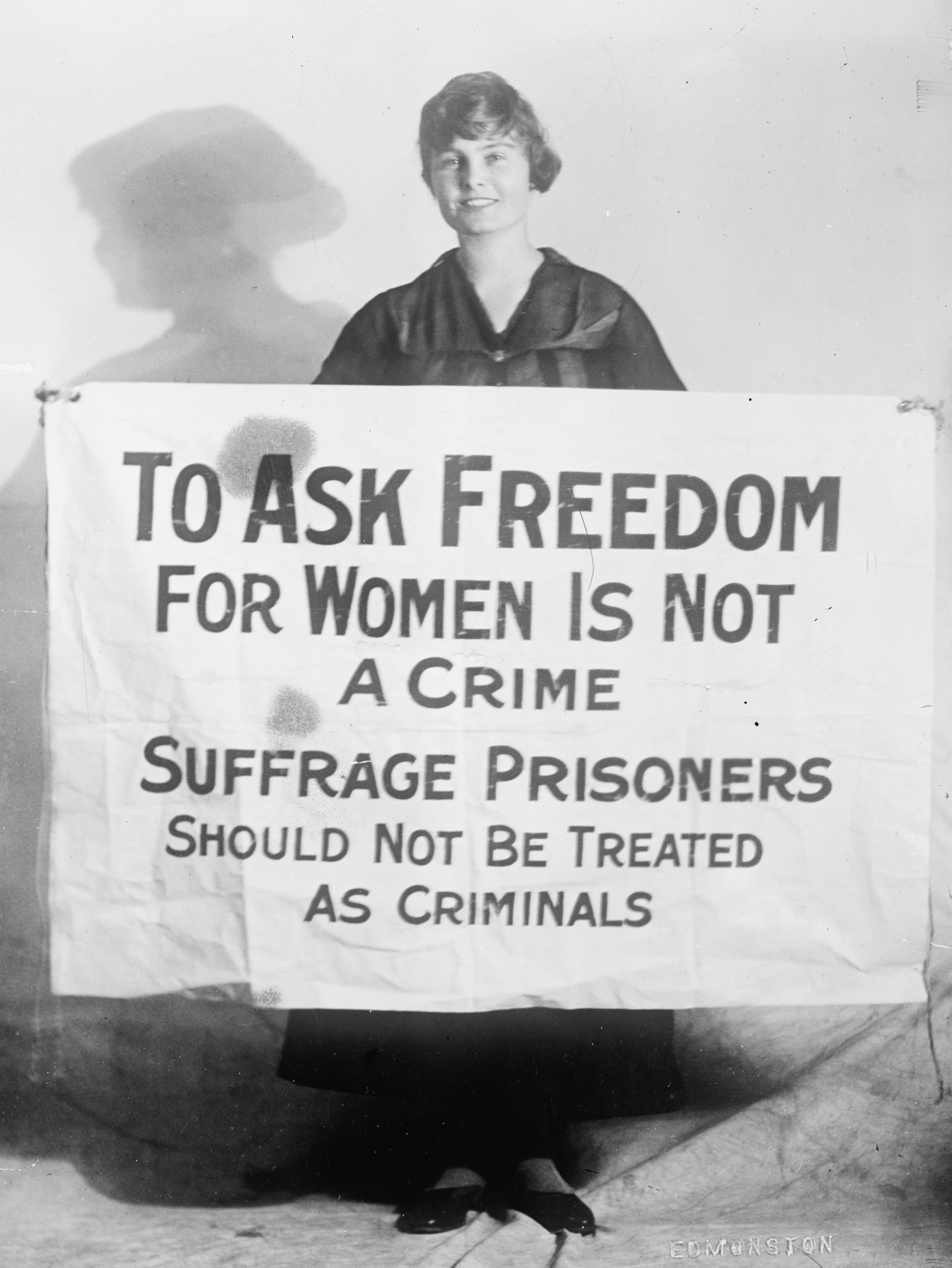
- Lucy Branham in 1919
- Born: April 29, 1892; Kempsville, Virginia
- Died: July 18, 1966 (aged 74)
- Education: Washington College, Johns Hopkins University
- Occupations: Educator, Suffragist, Politician

Lucy Gwynne Branham (April 29, 1892 – July 18, 1966) was an American suffragist associated with the National Woman's Party.

== Education ==
She earned degrees in history from Washington College in Maryland, and Johns Hopkins University (Master's degree).

== Career ==
While teaching in Florida, she received a Carnegie Medal for saving Dema T. Nelson from drowning in the ocean in 1915. She began work on a Ph.D. at Columbia University under Charles A. Beard, but, in the words of historian Julia L. Mickenberg, Branham "turned from academia to activism, becoming a field organizer for the NWP". Historian Katherine A. S. Siegel notes that, "In 1916, Branham put her studies aside to begin work in the National Woman's Party." Siegel writes that Branham "worked tirelessly for suffrage and, when she could, on the readings Beard assigned her," and she began teaching history in Columbia's adult extension program in the fall of 1920, but she left within a year to go to Russia as a representative of the New York Herald - Armand Hammer described her as the "suffragette history professor." Although the dissertation she was working on ("The History of Labor and Politics in New York") was listed as being "in progress" with an expected completion date of 1922, Columbia University "has no record that Branham ever finished her Ph.D." Her Johns Hopkins master's thesis ("An Outline of the Political History of Georgia, During the Revolutionary War") is the only thesis or dissertation listed under her name in WorldCat, so Branham must have been ABD and never finished her doctorate, concentrating on activism rather than academe.

In 1916, she was a National Woman's Party organizer in Utah, and in September of the following year she was arrested for picketing the White House as part of the Silent Sentinels, a NWP campaign for women's suffrage, for which she served two months in the Occoquan Workhouse and the District jail.

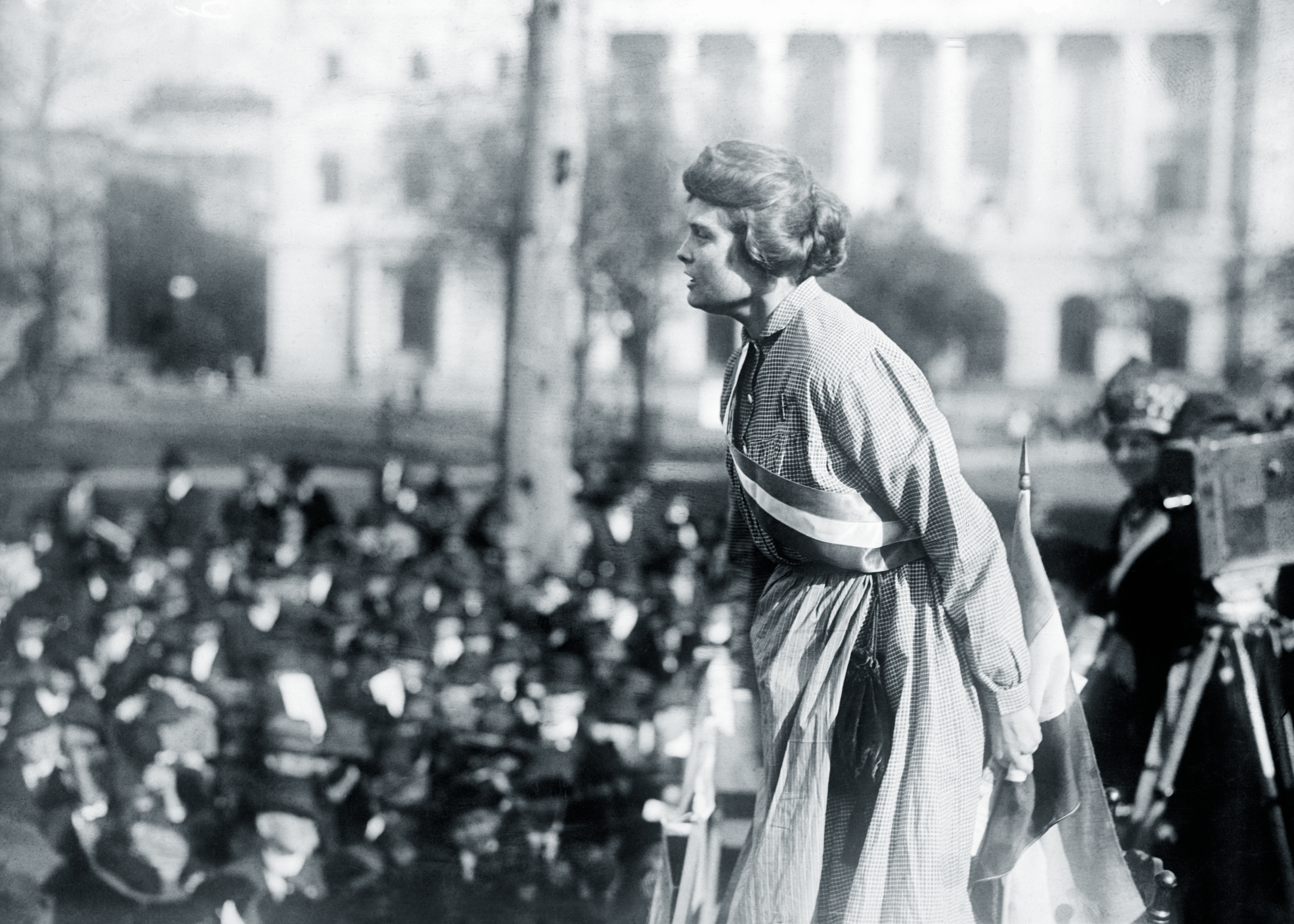
Branham speaking at a "Prison Special" tour stop

In 1918, Branham lobbied in Georgia, Tennessee, and Alabama for a federal amendment in the Senate that would legalize women's suffrage. She traveled around America speaking of her experiences in prison as part of the NWP's "Prison Special" tour of 1919. Also in 1919, Branham burned a letter from President Woodrow Wilson in Lafayette Square to protest for women's suffrage.

After women's suffrage was obtained in 1920, she led the Inez Milholland Memorial Fund Committee, which created an ongoing endowment fund for the NWP. Branham worked for Russian relief with the American Women's Emergency Committee, and lobbied Congress against the Allied blockade of Russia; worked with the American Friends Service Committee; served as field secretary for Russian Reconstruction Farms; headed the Women's Committee for the Recognition of Russia, which was under the Women's International League for Peace and Freedom; and was executive secretary of the American Society for Cultural Relations with Russia. She also worked with the World Woman's Party in Geneva and lobbied the League of Nations on equal rights issues. In the late 1950s she lived at Sewall–Belmont House and served on the NWP's Congressional Committee to lobby for the Equal Rights Amendment.

Branham's mother, Lucy Fisher Gwynne Branham, was also a suffragist, and was arrested for her part in the watch fire demonstrations in January 1919 and served three days in the District jail.

== See also ==
- List of suffragists and suffragettes
- List of women's rights activists
- Timeline of women's suffrage
- Women's suffrage organizations
