= Nancy Schoonmaker =

American suffragist (1873–1965)

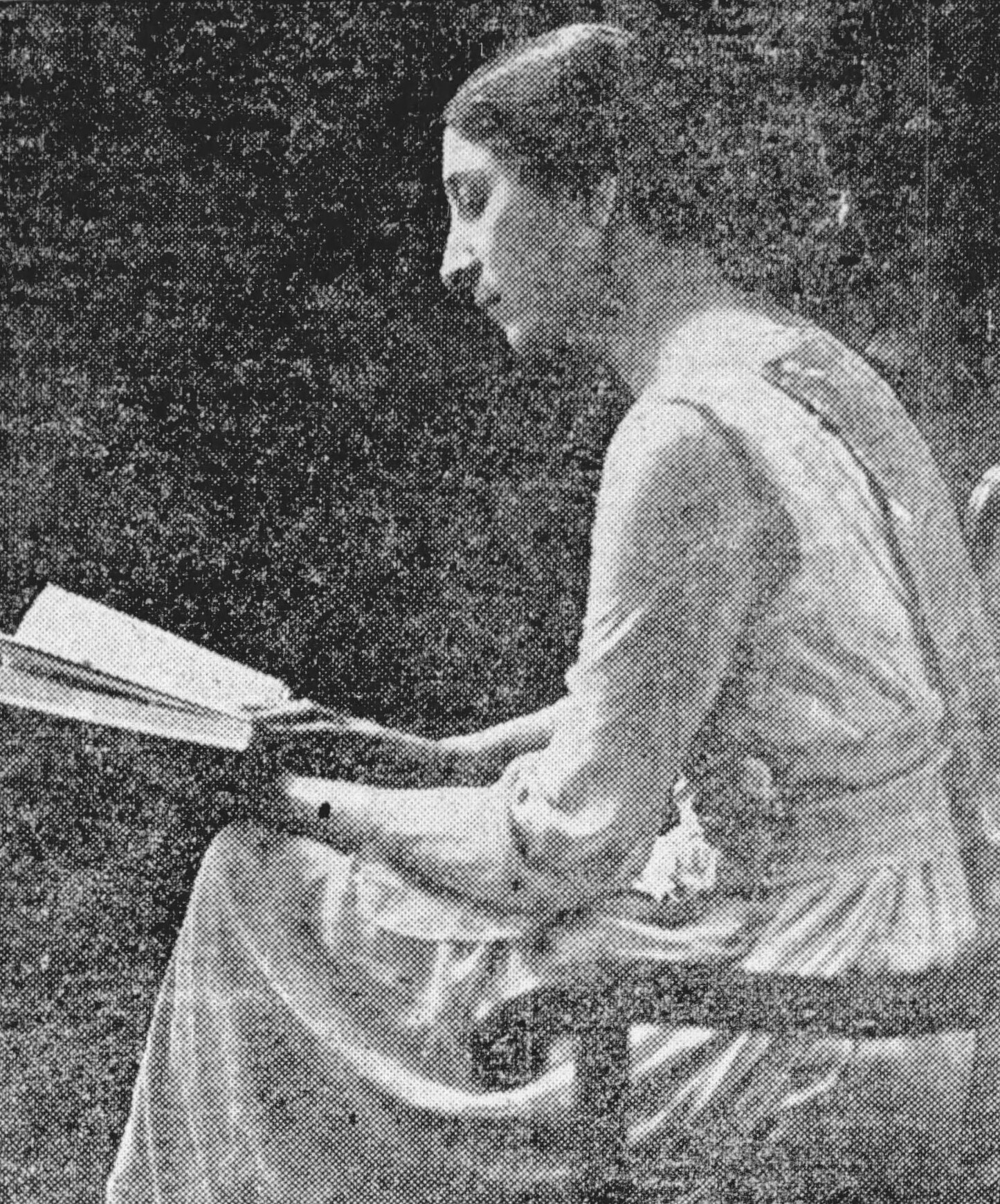
- Born: Nancy Musselman; October 30, 1873; Georgetown, Kentucky
- Died: October 27, 1965 (aged 91); New York City, New York, US
- Education: Transylvania University, University of Chicago, Harvard University, Sorbonne
- Occupations: Author, activist, politician
- Known for: Contributions to women's suffrage, political career
- Spouse: Edwin Davies Schoonmaker

Nancy Schoonmaker (October 30, 1873 – October 27, 1965 ) was a writer, politician, suffragist, and women's rights advocate during the 20th century.

== Biography ==
Nancy Schoonmaker, born Nancy Musselman to parents James and Penelope (Burgess) Musselman, was an American woman known for her promotion of women's suffrage and her written works. After graduating from Transylvania University in Lexington, KY in 1902, Schoonmaker pursued post-graduate work at the University of Chicago, Harvard, and the Sorbonne, in Paris. She married Edwin Davies Schoonmaker (a Transylvania University lecturer, as well as a fellow author and traveler) in 1904 and had one child, Frank M. Schoonmaker.

== Career ==
Schoonmaker held several careers in the fields of suffrage and of politics. During the 1910s, she conducted a correspondence course in citizenship for women in Connecticut and authored educative writing on the topic. Her work attracted the attention of New Hampshire suffragist Mary I Wood. Wood had been hopeful that women would be given the right to vote, but was concerned that they lacked the education to do so. In 1919, together, and with the approval of New Hampshire College (now the University of New Hampshire) president Ralph D. Hetzel, Wood and Schoonmaker conducted a school for citizenship on the NHC campus from July 8–11. Schoonmaker gave a number of sessions on topics such as city government. Schoonmaker's lectures became the basis for lectures at citizenship schools around the country.

Despite recommending nonpartisanship to her students, Schoonmaker toured the United States for the Democratic National Committee in support of the 1920 election campaign and the League of Nations. In 1921, Schoonmaker went to Geneva to represent the National League of Women Voters and the General Federation of Women's Clubs. Schoonmaker, a Democrat, ran for Congress in the 27th District of New York in 1937, but lost the election against Republican Lewis K. Rockefeller. Regardless, she continued to serve on the Democratic State Committee until 1940 and to attend League of Women Voters meetings. Like her father, who was a renowned critic of American wine, Schoonmaker was a published author who wrote a range of works including dramas, poetry, literature on wine and travel, and essays on citizenship.

== Published works ==
=== Authored works ===
The Eternal Fires (1910)

The Actual Government of Connecticut (1919)

Nancy Schoonmaker, Katharine Ludington

The Connecticut Idea (1910?)

=== Edited works ===
Nancy Schoonmaker, Doris Fielding Reid

We Testify (1941)

== See also ==
- List of American suffragists
