= Margaret Foley (suffragist) =

Irish-American labor organizer, suffragist and social worker

Margaret Lillian Foley
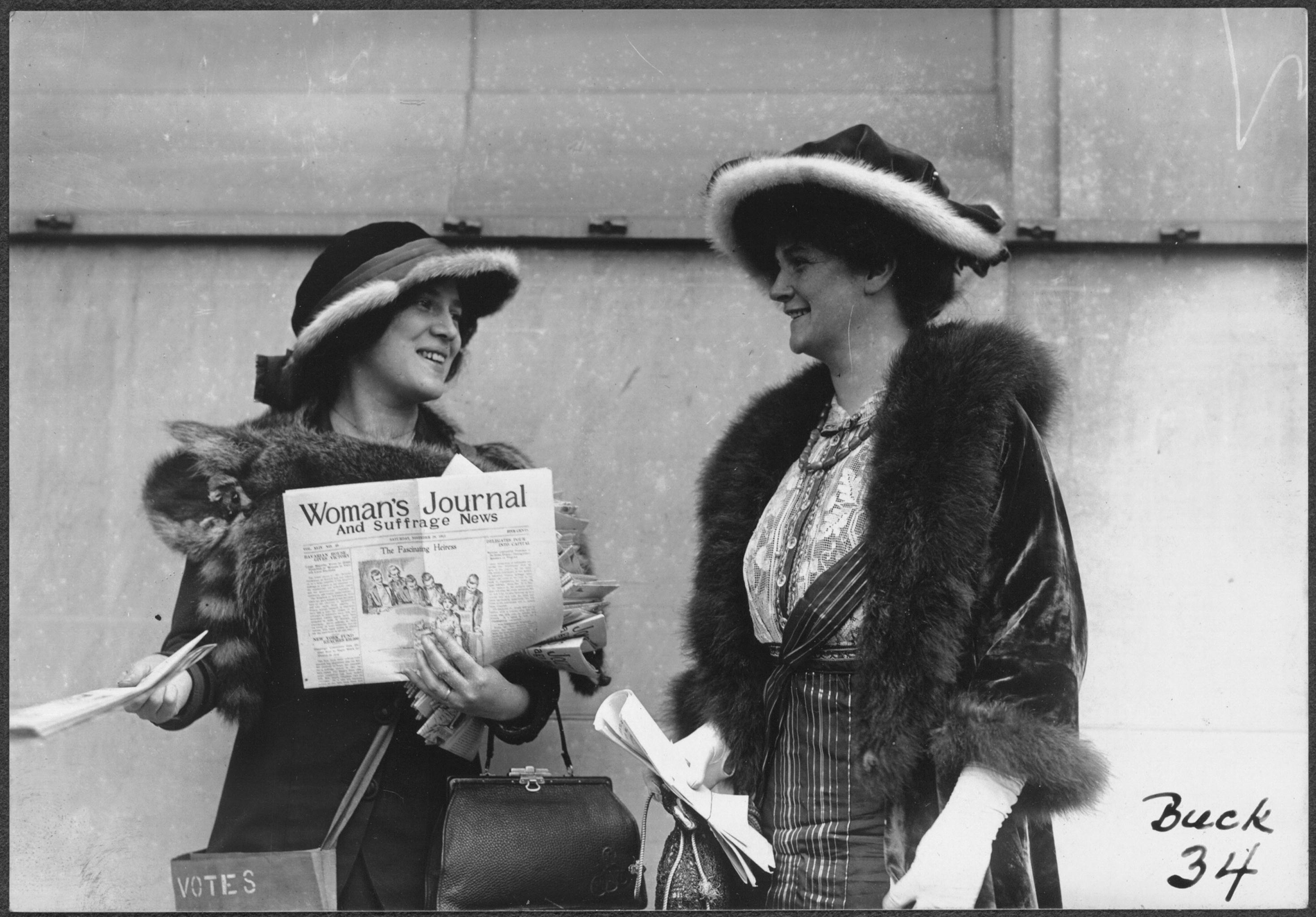
- Margaret Foley (right) and another suffragist distribute the Woman's Journal, 1913.
- Born: February 19, 1873; Boston, Massachusetts
- Died: June 14, 1957 (aged 82); Boston, Massachusetts
- Other name: Maggie Foley
- Known for: Suffragist, labor organizer

Margaret Lillian Foley (February 19, 1873 - June 14, 1957) was an Irish-American labor organizer, suffragist, and social worker from Boston. Known for confronting anti-suffrage candidates at political rallies, she was nicknamed the "Grand Heckler."

== Early life ==
Margaret Foley was born to Peter and Mary Foley on February 19, 1873, in the Meeting House Hill section of Dorchester. She and her sister, Celia, grew up in Roxbury and attended Girls' High School. An aspiring singer, she paid for voice lessons out of her earnings at a hat factory; her Boston Globe obituary describes her as "a singer of note". Family obligations took her to California, where she worked as a swimming and gymnastics teacher. When she returned to Boston she resumed her old job and became active in the trade union movement, eventually serving on the board of the Boston Women's Trade Union League. She also became an outspoken advocate for women's suffrage.

== Women's suffrage ==
Foley was one of the few Irish Catholic suffragists from Boston. Tall and confident, with a powerful, classically trained voice, she was a remarkably effective public speaker. She addressed hundreds of audiences—often as an audience member herself, earning her the title of "The Grand Heckler". If women were given the vote, she argued, they could become a major force in improving working conditions in factories and fighting government corruption. Foley worked as a speaker and organizer for the Massachusetts Woman Suffrage Association (MWSA) from 1906 to 1915. She was also involved with the Margaret Brent Suffrage Guild, a Massachusetts Catholic group, and the Boston Equal Suffrage Association for Good Government (BESAGG).

Inspired by English suffragists such as the Pankhursts, Massachusetts suffragists began making open-air speaking tours in 1909. Most of the speakers were middle- or upper-class women who were ill at ease addressing crowds of mill workers at lunchtime. As a working-class Irish Catholic with a colorful personality, Foley stood out. She often braved male-dominated crowds in settings such as the Boston Stock Exchange and the Chamber of Commerce, speaking and handing out leaflets. To avoid being arrested for speaking on a public street without a permit, she once addressed a Boston crowd from the roof of a one-story building:

Suddenly, sounding shrilly above the deep tones of the speaker, a woman's voice was heard. It was Miss Foley who was speaking and the crowd's attention was distracted from the speaker and riveted upon the woman....Miss Foley addressed Mr. McInerney: "Why did you vote against the most important trade union measure of the year—the woman suffrage bill?"

In her most famous confrontation, she took on Timothy Callahan, a speaker at James Michael Curley's Tammany Hall club in Boston. Before a crowd of 1,500 men, the stylishly dressed Miss Foley debated her opponent so successfully that when she was finished, the audience gave three cheers for women's rights and threw their hats in the air. In 1910 she made a solo balloon flight over Lawrence, Massachusetts, tossing suffrage literature from the basket.

In 1911 she and Florence Luscomb attended the international suffrage convention in Stockholm and spent a month in London studying the tactics used by English suffragists. That same year, in her automobile known as the "Big Suffragette Machine", she followed the Republican candidate for governor, Louis A. Frothingham, from one speaking engagement to the next, challenging his anti-suffrage views. Frothingham was so frustrated he ordered his campaign band to start playing whenever she tried to speak. He was not elected.

She began speaking and organizing nationally in 1912, traveling to Ohio, Nevada, New York, Pennsylvania, and other states. In 1914 she toured Nevada for two months, speaking to over 20,000 men. She attracted publicity and marriage proposals while she was there; once dressing like a miner in coat and trousers, another time descending 2,500 feet underground in Virginia City to give a suffrage speech. Nevada women won the vote that year. In 1916, Foley made an extensive tour of Southern states, sponsored by the Woman's Journal. The following year she was a delegate to the MWSA's national convention.

Despite her success as a speaker, Foley was an outsider among the elite women of the MWSA and BESAGG. Her employers often seemed oblivious to the financial realities of working women, resulting in disputes over delayed paychecks and travel expenses. Her working-class, Irish Catholic background was an asset while she was rallying crowds of workers on the streets of Boston, but after the start of World War I when the movement's focus shifted to other, subtler tactics, Foley found herself shut out. She had difficulty finding regular employment until 1920 when, having been nominated for a position in city government by Irish Catholic Mayor John F. Fitzgerald the year before, she was finally appointed to the Children's Institutions Department by Mayor Andrew James Peters.

== Later years ==
Foley was Trustee for Children in the Children's Institutions Department of the City of Boston from 1913 to 1920, and deputy commissioner of the Child Welfare Division in the Institutions Department of the City of Boston from 1920 to 1926. In 1936 she worked on Robert E. Greenwood's unsuccessful campaign for the U.S. Senate. She lived for many years with her companion Helen Elizabeth Goodnow, a fellow suffragist from an affluent Boston family. She died at Carney Hospital on June 14, 1957.

== See also ==
- Boston marriage
