= Addie Brown =

African-American letter writer (1841–1870)

- Born: Adeline Brown; December 21, 1841
- Died: January 11, 1870 (aged 28); Philadelphia, Pennsylvania
- Other names: Addie Brown Tines, Addie Tines
- Occupations: Domestic worker, seamstress, cook
- Years active: 1859–1869

Addie Brown (December 21, 1841 – January 11, 1870) was an American working-class free Black woman, who worked in various New England towns and wrote of her difficulties to earn a living. Her letters depict not only the racism and sexism faced by Northern (Note: Northern in this context means outside the slave-holding southern states and above the Mason–Dixon line. Slavery had been abolished in New England beginning in 1780 and by 1820 all northern states had laws requiring gradual emancipation and the abolition of slavery. The abolition of slavery in the North created a new class of free Blacks, who having been born free, saw themselves as different from freedmen, former slaves.) Black women, but also her struggles with education, her awareness of politics, and her romantic friendship with Rebecca Primus. An acute observer, she provided through her letters perspective on the lives of working-class people in the nineteenth century, as well as on women's intimate relationships.

Brown was raised in Philadelphia and had no formal education. She learned to read and write and, in order to improve her ability to earn a living, to sew and cook. Having few ties with her own family, she became an intimate member of the prominent Primus family of Hartford, Connecticut. For a decade between 1859 and 1868, she had a romantic friendship with the oldest daughter of the family and exchanged letters with her. The letters tell of Brown's fourteen different employers and eight addresses during the period, in addition to giving information about her chronic illnesses and fatigue. She wrote vivid descriptions of events in the Black communities in which she lived. Housed in the Primus collection of the Connecticut Museum of Culture and History, her letters give rare insight into the lives of working-class Black women in the period immediately preceding and following the American Civil War.

== Early life and education ==
Adeline Brown was born on December 21, 1841, and was raised in Philadelphia, Pennsylvania, as a free Black person. Her father died during her childhood and her mother remarried, despite Addie's objections. She lived briefly with an aunt in Philadelphia, and then cut off ties with her family, except for a brother, Ally Brown, who served in the Civil War. Brown did not have a formal education, and although she had learned to read and write, her handwriting was difficult to read and peppered with poor grammar and colloquial speech. It is unknown how she came to know the Primus family of Hartford, Connecticut. She may have attended the Shiloh Baptist Church in Philadelphia, which was pastored by Jeremiah Asher, a first cousin to Holdridge Primus, or have been a boarder in the Primus's home. She might also have worked at a restaurant in Hartford owned by Jeremiah Jacobs and Raphael Sands. Jacobs was the brother of Mehitable Primus and Sands was their brother-in-law. Although it is unknown how she met the family, by 1859, Brown was part of the inner circle of the Primus family and had begun an intense friendship with Holdridge and Mehitable's oldest daughter, Rebecca.

Brown was described as tall, and although she exchanged photographs with Primus, none have been found. Her letters reveal her to be friendly, congenial, and spirited, but cautious in showing affection. Independent and confident, she made pragmatic choices to survive and had little patience with irritable people. She was at times a mischief-maker, but she was open and honest about her feelings and poured out her emotions in her letters. Lacking close family ties, Brown created fictitious family connections with friends. Ally, the one brother with whom she kept in touch, broke off contact with her after she was unable to visit him for Thanksgiving because she needed to work. She was bright, intelligent, keenly observant, and a good story-teller, bringing life and detail to the events she described in her letters.

== Career ==
In 1859, Brown was employed by the Games family of Waterford, Connecticut. Her charge, Mrs. Games, was ill and Brown found the post unsatisfactory, primarily because of the unwanted advances of Mr. Games. Although Mrs. Games offered to continue the position, Brown did not accept, longing to return to Hartford and Rebecca Primus. In a February 1860 letter, she asked Primus to intercede with her mother so that she could learn how to sew, realizing that sewing would allow her to work even if she did not have the physical stamina to do domestic work. Returning to Hartford, she worked for a few months for a Mrs. Kellogg, but left in August, after experiencing a severe sunburn. By early 1861, Brown was living in the household of John H. Jackson, proprietor of an eating house and saloon in New York City. Her brother Ally also resided in this family's home, which was also a boardinghouse, in Greenwich Village. Brown cared for the couple's nine children and kept their house, but was rarely paid. Instead, Mrs. Jackson at times treated Brown as if she was family (Note: Farah Jasmine Griffin, who edited and published the Brown and Primus letters, concluded that although Brown referred to the Jacksons as mother and father, it was evident that they were not her biological parents. On the other hand, Barbara J. Beeching, a scholar who has studied Hartford's Black middle class, concluded that the lack of pay, ability to visit and have visitors call on her, and the honorific titles, might indicate a blood tie.) and at other times as if she was an apprentice learning the trade to be a milliner and seamstress.

Struggling with overwork and irregular pay, Brown left the Jacksons in September 1862, and returned to Hartford. In 1862, she worked for Primus's family friends Henry and Elizabeth Nott. Elizabeth allowed Primus to spend the night with Brown at her home, but these visits stopped when Rebecca's father, Holdridge, objected. (Note: At the time, sharing beds was commonplace. Having one's own bed was a luxury only the upper classes could afford. Beeching speculates Holdridge may have objected because the women chose to sleep together, rather than because it was a necessity.) For the rest of her first three years in Hartford, little is known of Brown's employment. Few letters were written by Brown, since she and Primus were living in the same town. The letters that exist in the period show that at this time their physical relationship became more intense. In 1865, Brown worked at Smith's Dye House, an establishment resembling a modern laundry or dry cleaner. She made good money, $19 per month at a time when female domestic workers earned about $2.65 per month including their board. From her salary, she paid Primus's aunt, Emily Sands, about $8.50 per month for room and board. Brown also worked regular hours, instead of being on call at all hours of the day and night when working in a household. She lost the job because of a lack of customers in December 1865.

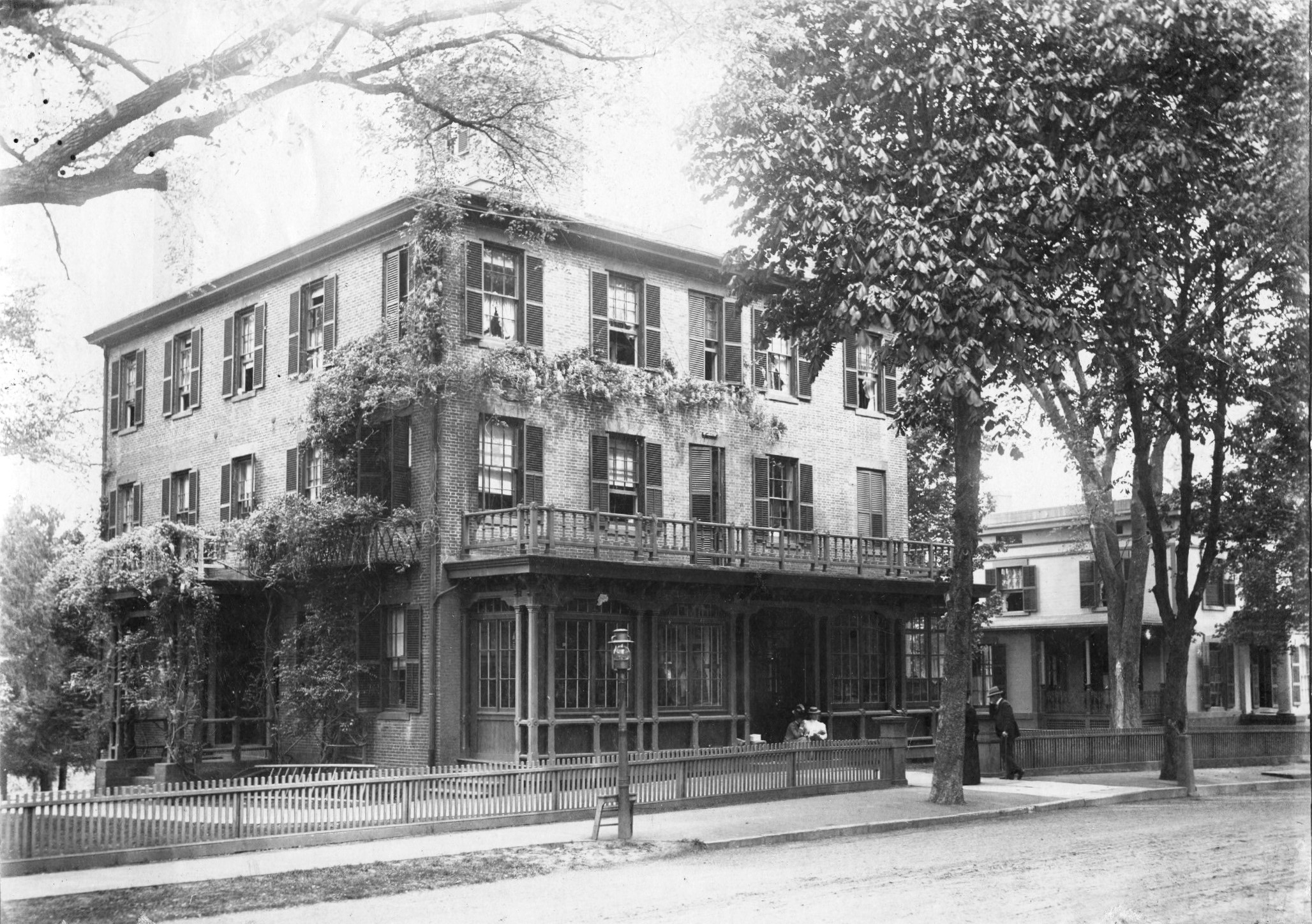
Miss Porter's School, circa 1880

The previous month, Primus had gone to Maryland to establish a school for the Freedmen's Bureau. Brown recognized at that time that although her feelings for Primus had not lessened, it was likely that their lives would be lived separately. One of her suitors for several years had been Joseph Tines. He was a waiter on the Granite State steamship, which regularly ran between Hartford and New York City. He was originally from Philadelphia, so she may have known him from childhood there, or met him when she was working in New York. She announced her engagement to Tines in a letter to Primus in December 1865. At that time, Brown was working for various Hartford ladies – Mrs. Couch, Mrs. Doughlass, and Mrs. Swans – sewing garments and hoping to make enough money to get through the winter of 1866. She often secured clients through Mehitable. By February, she was working for professor John T. Huntington, who taught at Trinity College. From the beginning the job did not go well as Huntington had agreed to pay her $2.50 per week and then tried to pay her only $2.00. Brown objected and was successful in the dispute, but did not like the work and left in April, taking in sewing until she secured a position with the Crowell family in May.

Brown remained at the Crowells for a year, but in May 1867 moved to Farmington to work at Miss Porter's School, as an assistant to Raphael Sands. She initially enjoyed working at the school, the comradery of other workers, and the ability to use the library. She earned $12 per month and did not have to pay for room and board, but the work was exhausting and she reported that she often had headaches, backaches, and poor health. She also experienced racist attitudes while working at the school. Her political conscience was growing at the time and she reported in letters to Primus that she refused to attend a minstrel show and protested against the local church's segregated seating. She took over Raphael's position as head cook in the summer, but decided in January 1868 that she was definitely going to marry. Even though Miss Porter offered to hire both Brown and Tines, Brown turned down the job because it was so strenuous. In April, Brown married Tines and moved back to Philadelphia. An anonymous letter, possibly from Tines, indicates that they had a happy life and children.

== Correspondence ==
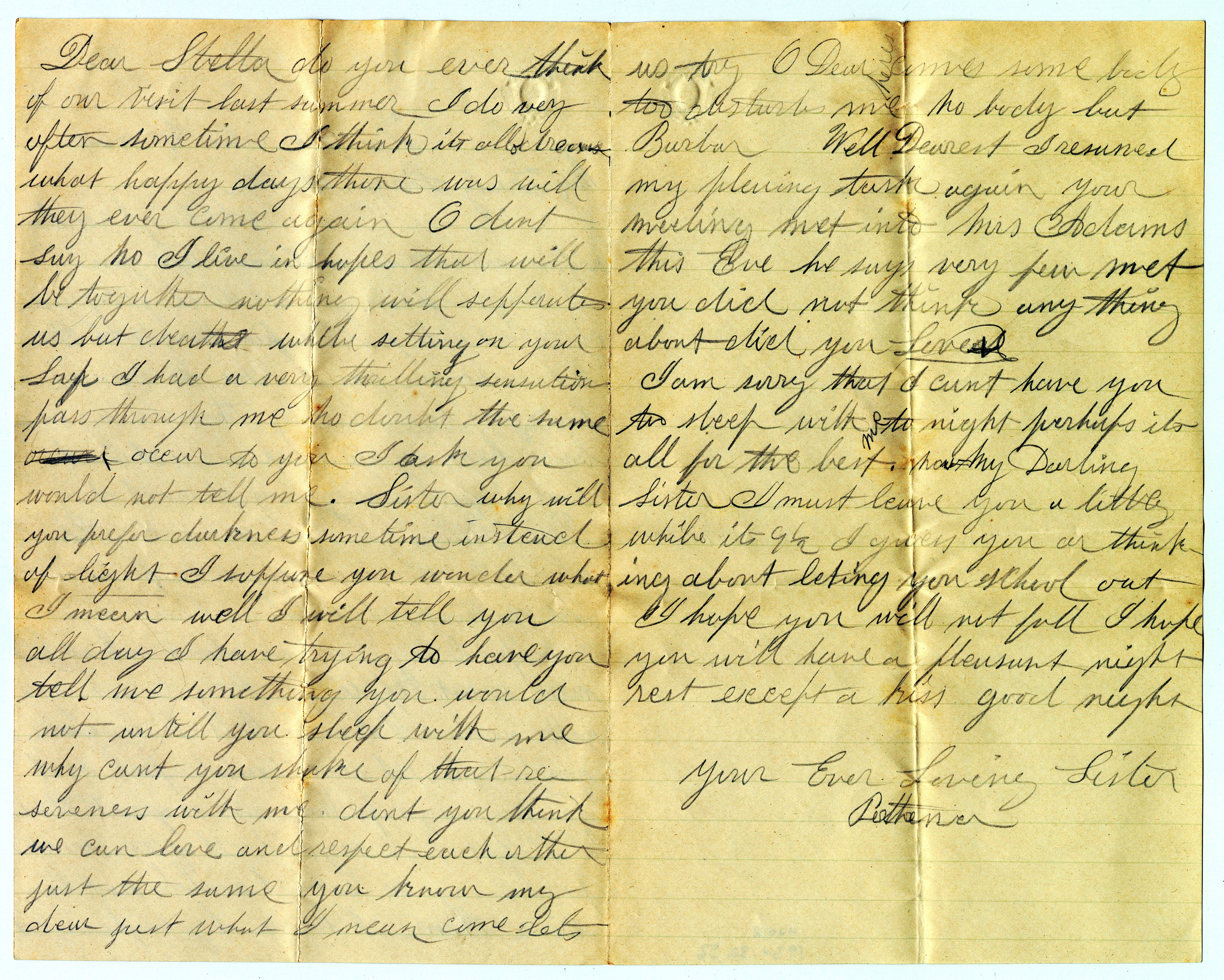
Brown (Aerthena) to Primus (Stella), 1864

Brown wrote more than a hundred letters to Primus between 1859 and 1869. They contain critical observations about the details of her life and work, society and politics, gossip about their community, her search for affection, and her expression of deep feeling for Primus. In some letters, she signed as Aerthena and addressed Primus as Stella. She often wrote of flirtations with suitors and the possibility of marriage, which were openly discussed without fear of threat to their own relationship. Her principle emotional attachment was to Primus, but she recognized the importance of marriage for her economic security and social stability. From 1862, the nature of the letters changed, with Brown focusing on what she was reading and her involvement in community events. She became more confident and wrote more of her efforts at self-improvement and the ways she tried to better her opportunities. She wrote of attending balls, fairs, and debates, giving perspective on the events which were important to the black community and weighing in on issues like emancipation, civil rights, and political events.

Although the letters contain Brown's private thoughts and expressions of eroticism, (Note: Brown's letters were intimate epistles intended for Primus. The weekly letters Primus wrote to her family were meant to be shared.) the relationship between the two women was not a secret to their family and friends. Some of them felt the relationship was an infatuation that would dissolve after marriage. Mehitable accepted the relationship and acknowledged that if one of them had been a man, they might have married. Their community supported their friendship, as long as it would not interfere with a courtship with an eventual marriage to a man. Writing about a novel, Women Friendships by Grace Aguilar, that she had read, Brown analyzed whether the characters' differing social status, age, and education mirrored her own relationship with Primus. As the book was a cautionary tale against mixed-class friendships, Brown wondered if it meant that their relationship was doomed. According to sociologist Farah Griffin, Primus thought that class was less important than one's moral reputation. Besides Brown's own declarations of love for Primus, the letters also gossiped openly about topics like incest and sex outside of marriage, as well as of encounters with other women with whom she had shared a bed.

== Death and legacy ==
Brown died from tuberculosis on January 11, 1870, at her home. Primus had saved the correspondence Brown wrote to her, indicating the importance of their relationship. After Primus's death, the letters were acquired in 1934 by the Connecticut Museum of Culture and History. (Note: The collection in the Primus Papers at the Connecticut Museum of Culture and History contains sixty letters from Primus to her family, and one hundred and fifty letters from Brown to Primus. The letters from Primus to Brown have not been located.) Women's historian Eloise E. Scroggins noted that Brown's letters "provide insight into Black female relationships and the difficulties of life for Northern Blacks during the Civil War" period. They reveal the precarious economic and political circumstances of African Americans living in New England both before and after the war; Brown had at least fourteen employers and eight addresses between 1859 and 1867. They also fill a void in the historical documentation about Black women's private lives. History has often focused on records left by organizations and leaders, paying scarce attention to the lives and interactions of ordinary people and particularly women's lives have remained unexplored.

Research on romantic friendships has also focused on White women's relationships, which do not typically depict an erotic nature to their passionate attachments. Some scholars, such as Carroll Smith-Rosenberg and Lillian Faderman, have argued that liaisons between White women at the time describe kissing, hugging, and sharing a bed, but not sexual contact. Other scholars, according to Sue Morgan, Judith M. Bennett and Leila J. Rupp, have disagreed, noting that the depiction of romantic friendship as devoid of lesbian behavior was premature as while few documents have surfaced, some have, and such a conclusion might erase lesbian identity. Nevertheless, Brown's letters add dimension to the analysis of nineteenth-century same-sex relationships, as she openly wrote of their passion, kisses, and touching of the breasts. The relationship between Brown and Primus defies modern definitions of heterosexual and homosexual relationships, because of the separate spheres in which men and women lived their lives in the nineteenth century. What the letters show, according to sociologist Karen Hansen, is that sexuality was more fluid in the Victorian era than had been previously acknowledged by scholars. Their relationship also gives insight into the attitudes among members of the Black community in the years after slavery ended.
