= Maud Wood Park =

Suffragist and creator of Harvard's Schlesinger Library

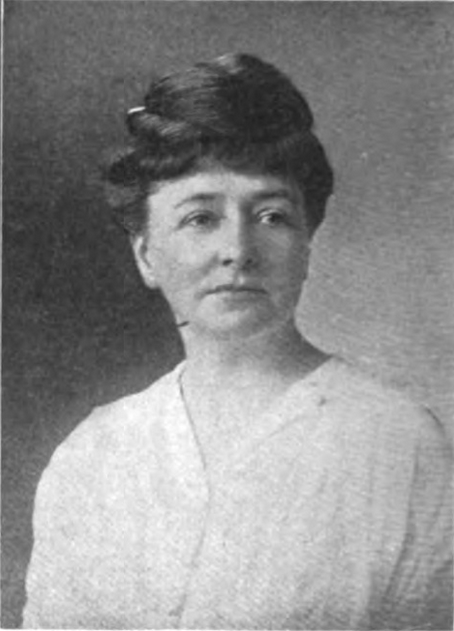
- Portrait of Maud Wood Park
- Born: January 25, 1871; Boston, Massachusetts
- Died: May 8, 1955 (aged 84); Reading, Massachusetts
- Education: St. Agnes School; Radcliffe College
- Occupation: Suffragist
- Spouses: Charles Edward Park; Robert Freeman Hunter

Maud Wood Park (January 25, 1871 – May 8, 1955) was an American suffragist and women's rights activist.

== Career overview ==
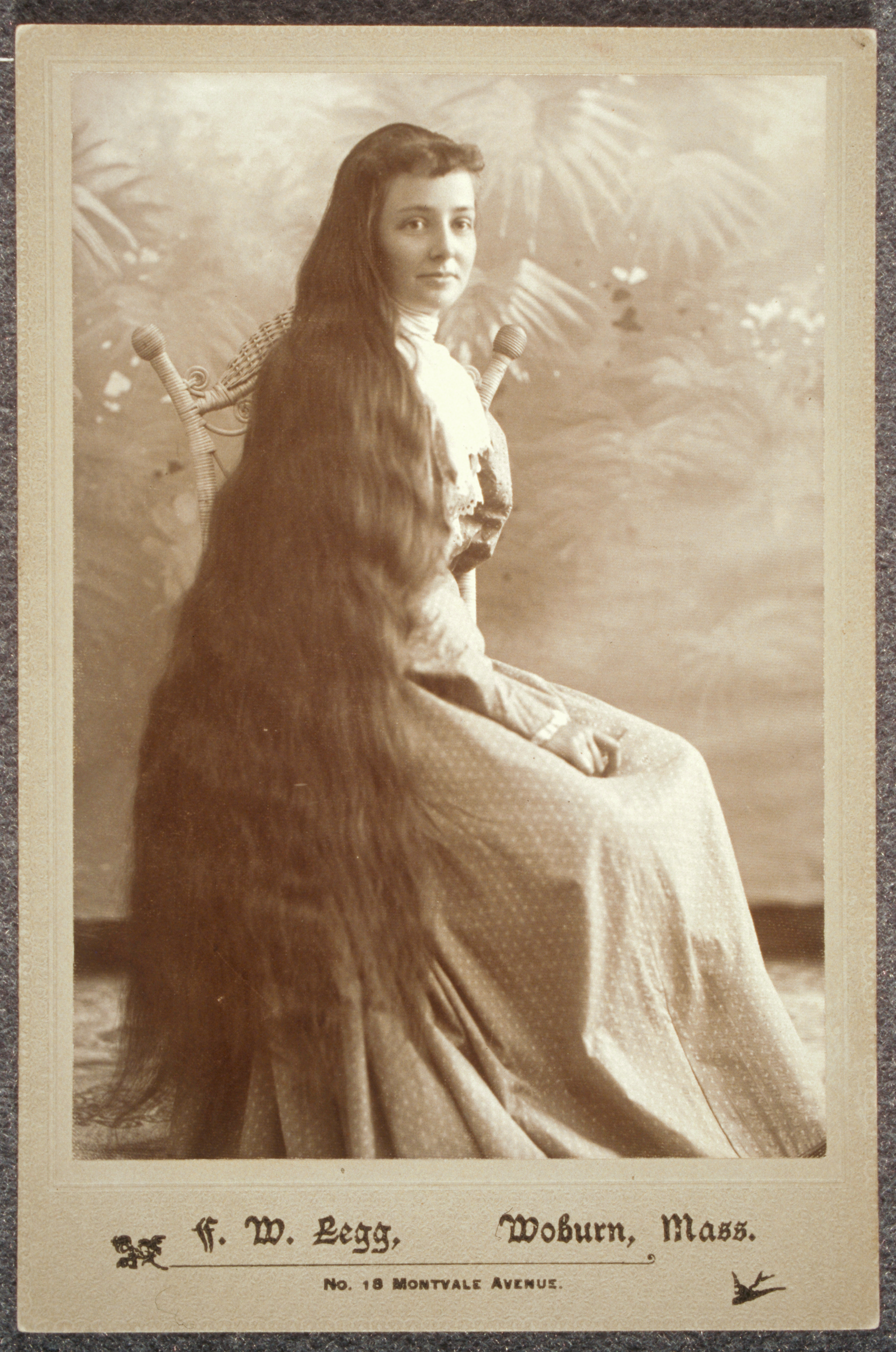
Park with her hair down, ca. 1895-1896.

She was born in Boston, Massachusetts. In 1887 she graduated from St. Agnes School in Albany, New York, after which she taught for eight years before attending Radcliffe College. While there she married Charles Edward Park. She graduated from Radcliffe, where she was one of only two students who supported suffrage for women, in 1898. In 1900 she attended the National American Women Suffrage Association convention, where she discovered that, at the age of 29, she was the youngest delegate present. Park determined to attract a younger group of women to the organization and, in concert with Inez Haynes Gillmore, formed the College Equal Suffrage League. She toured colleges promoting it, and started chapters in thirty states. She also organized the National College Equal Suffrage League in 1908.

Park was friends with another American suffragist, Carrie Chapman Catt, who recruited her to campaign in Washington, D.C. for the Nineteenth Amendment, which is the amendment that guarantees suffrage for American women. In 1901 Park became one of the founders of the Boston Equal Suffrage Association for Good Government (BESAGG), which became the League of Women Voters of Boston when the Nineteenth Amendment was ratified in 1920. She was BESAGG's executive secretary for twelve years. In 1920 Park became the first president of the League of Women Voters, a position she held until resigning in 1924 for reasons of health. From 1925 until 1928 she was the League's legislative counselor.

Park also organized the lobbying group known as the Women's Joint Congressional Committee in 1924, and worked as its chairwoman. This group was instrumental in the passage of the Sheppard–Towner Act of 1921 and the Cable Act of 1922, both of which advanced women's rights. Park pioneered the "front door lobby," a direct approach to lobbying that symbolized the idealism of woman suffrage. She cowrote the book Front Door Lobby. (An Account of the Achievement of Woman Suffrage in the United States), with Edna Lamprey Stantial, which was finally published in 1960. She also wrote the play Lucy Stone, which was first produced in 1939 in Boston.

== Personal life and education ==
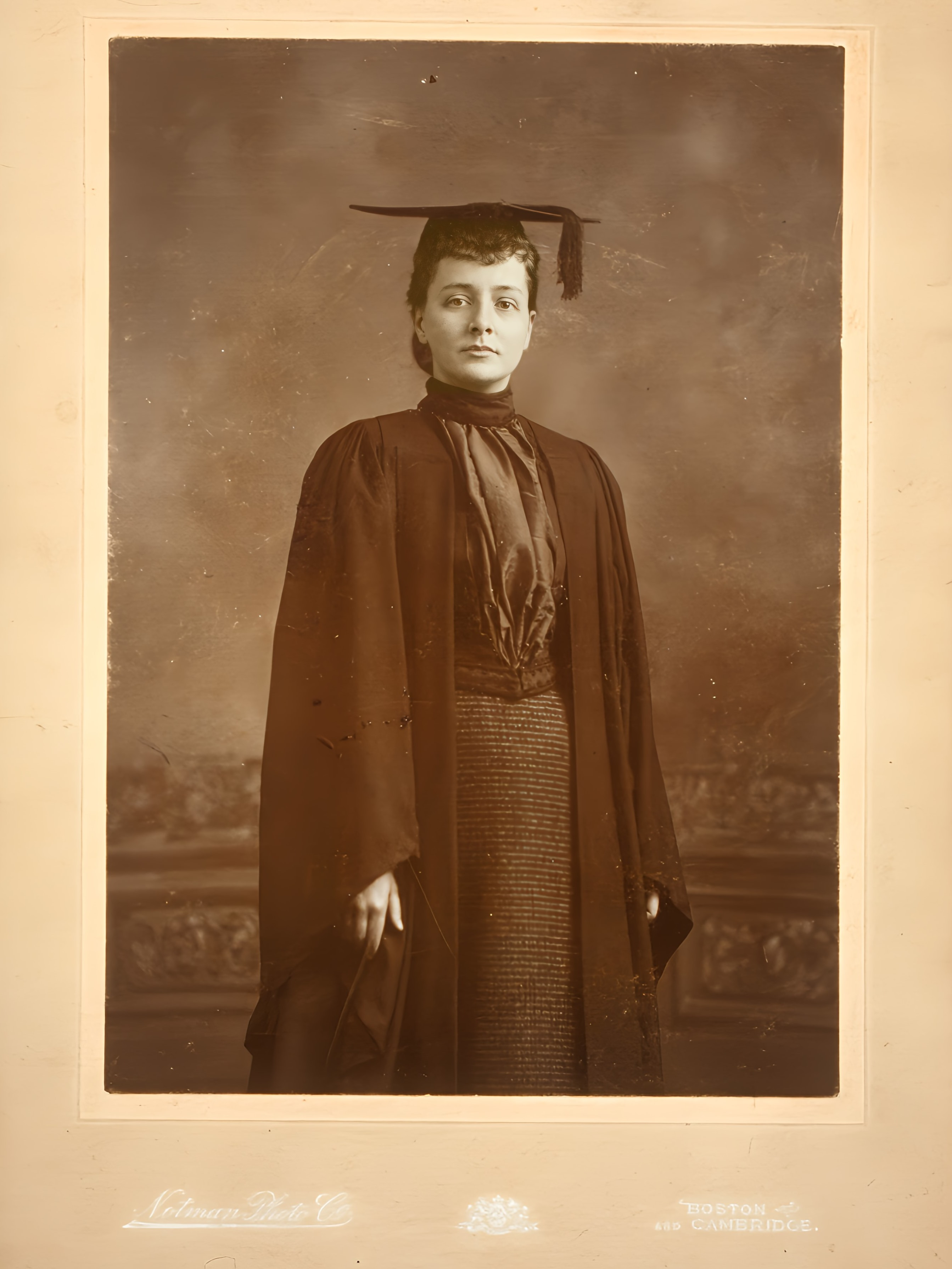
Portrait of Maud Wood Park in cap and gown, 1898

Park attended Radcliffe College where her professors and classmates alike were either against women's suffrage or had little interest in it. Being one of the few college women interested in suffrage, she was invited to speak at the Massachusetts Woman Suffrage Association annual dinner during her senior year. While at Radcliffe, she met and later married Charles Edward Park; he died in 1904. She secretly married Robert Freeman Hunter in 1908. He died suddenly in 1928.

== Work with the National American Women Suffrage Association ==
From 1917 to 1919, Park led the congressional lobbying effort of the National American Woman Suffrage Association in which her task was to obtain congressional approval of the woman suffrage amendment. Park trained volunteers visiting Washington, D.C. to lobby their congressional representatives and coordinated the lobbying effort of the association. She developed strategies to get the amendment passed including keeping in-depth biographical and personal records of the members of congress.

Owing to World War I, Congress was only debating war-related issues at this time, but through her connections, Park was able to get a special committee on women's suffrage to be formed. This committee approved a woman's suffrage amendment which the House of Representatives approved in 1918. The Senate approved it in 1919 and sent it to the states for ratification. In 1920 the 19th Amendment was ratified.

== Work with other organizations ==
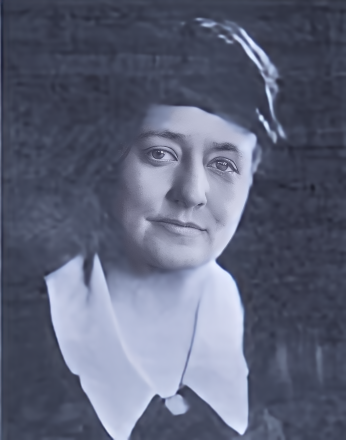
Maud Wood Park, 1921

Maud Wood Park founded the College Equal Suffrage League in 1900 with Inez Haynes in order to get younger, more well educated women involved in the suffrage movement. Their particular aim was to get college alumnae to form chapters and organize women at their alma maters. In 1904, Harriot Eaton Stanton Blatch and Caroline Lexow invited them to set up college leagues throughout New York state. In 1906, the National American Woman Suffrage Association invited the College Equal Suffrage League to initiate similar organizations throughout the country. Maud Wood Park was also one of the founders of the Boston Equal Suffrage Association for Good Government (BESAGG) along with Pauline Agassiz Shaw and Mary Hutcheson Page. She and Page were in charge of decision making and public speaking. The BESAGG turned into The League of Women Voters after women got the right to vote in 1920. Maud Wood Park also became the president of The League of Women Voters in 1920. During her time in this position (until 1924), she traveled the US to lecture and recruit for new members and she helped develop the legislative agenda.

Park said of the aim of The League of Women Voters, "It has chosen to be a middle-of-the-road organization in which persons of widely differing political views might work out together a program of definite advance on which they could agree. It has been willing to go ahead slowly in order to go ahead steadily. It has not sought to lead a few women a long way quickly, but rather to lead many women a little way at a time."

Maud Wood Park helped organize and head the Women's Joint Congressional Committee which passed the Sheppard–Towner Maternity and Infancy Protection Act of 1921 and the Cable Act in 1922.

== Later life ==
Park began the Schlesinger Library on August 26, 1943, when she donated her collection of books, papers, and memorabilia on female reformers to Radcliffe. This donation grew into a research library called the "Women's Archives," which was renamed in 1965 after Elizabeth Bancroft Schlesinger and her husband Arthur M. Schlesinger, as they were strong supporters of the library's mission.

Park died in 1955 in Massachusetts.

== See also ==
- List of suffragists and suffragettes
- List of women's rights activists
- Timeline of women's suffrage
- Women's suffrage organizations
