= Edna Lamprey Stantial =

American suffragist and archivist

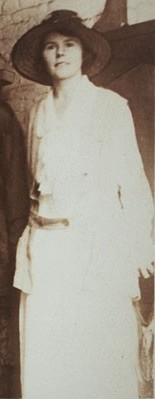
- Stantial in 1920
- Born: Edna Frances Lamprey; February 22, 1897; Reading, Massachusetts, United States
- Died: April 10, 1985 (aged 88); Martha's Vineyard, Massachusetts, United States
- Occupations: Activist; Archivist

Edna Frances Lamprey Stantial (1897–1985) was an American suffragist and archivist.

== Early life and marriage ==
Edna Frances Lamprey was born in 1897 in Reading, Massachusetts. Her parents were Mollie McClelland Stantial and Frank Stantial. She attended Melrose High School and graduated in 1913. She attended Burdett College, a now defunct business school in Massachusetts, where she was certified as a secretary in 1914. She served as a secretary at the Economic Club of Boston from 1914 until 1916. On June 8, 1918, Stantial married Guy W. Stantial.

== Women's rights work ==
In 1916, Stantial, the youngest member of the Boston Equal Suffrage Association for Good Government, became the organization's secretary. She served in the position until 1920. She became the Executive Secretary for the Boston League of Women Voters in 1920, just after the Nineteenth Amendment to the United States Constitution was confirmed. She left the position in 1924 upon the birth of her daughter, Barbara.

While caring for her daughter, Stantial volunteered for numerous women's rights organizations. From 1924 until 1930, she was the Treasurer of the Massachusetts League of Women Voters, followed by serving as the organization's Finance Committee, from 1930 until 1932.

It was during this time when she befriended Alice Stone Blackwell and Maud Wood Park and began developing her archival skills. She assisted Park with organizing her personal papers which she donated to Radcliffe College in 1943. She also was the executor of Park's will, which included organizing additional papers owned by Park to be donated to the Library of Congress. Regarding Blackwell, Stantial lived next to her on Martha's Vineyard.

Stantial served as a board member of the Birth Control League of Massachusetts in 1940. During this time, she actively supported the "mother's health referendum," which supported birth control access for women in Massachusetts. In 1950, she was named the archivist for the National American Woman Suffrage Association. During her time there, she organized the papers of Carrie Chapman Catt and Blackwell's family papers to be donated to the Library of Congress.

== Later life and death ==
Stantial lived in Melrose, Massachusetts part-time, living in Martha's Vineyard also. Stantial was active in the Melrose community, including in her local Unitarian Church. She also chaired the Personnel Committee of the Melrose Public Safety Committee in the 1940s. She raised money for the New England Hospital, serving on their board and focusing on fundraising for the Mary E. Driscoll Alcoholic Unit. She volunteered for the hospital in administrative capacities until 1974.

Eventually, Stantial returned to Martha's Vineyard full-time. Her husband, Guy, died in 1982. She died at her home in Martha's Vineyard in 1985.

== Legacy ==
Stantial's papers reside in the collection of the Schlesinger Library at Harvard University.
