= Arthur Schlesinger =

Arthur Schlesinger may refer to:

- Arthur M. Schlesinger Sr. (1888–1965), American historian and professor at Harvard University
- Arthur M. Schlesinger Jr. (1917–2007), his son, American historian, social critic and former John F. Kennedy associate
