= Farah Griffin =

American academic

- Awards: Guggenheim Fellowship (2021); Christian Gauss Award (2022)

Academic background
- Education: Harvard University (BA); Yale University (PhD)

Academic work
- Discipline: African-American literature
- Institutions: Columbia University

Farah Jasmine Griffin (born 1963) is an American academic and professor specializing in African-American literature. She is William B. Ransford Professor of English and Comparative Literature and African-American Studies, chair of the African American and African Diaspora Studies Department, and Director Elect of the Columbia University Institute for Research in African American Studies at Columbia University.

She received her BA degree from Harvard University in 1985. She completed her PhD from Yale University in 1992.

In 2021, she received a Guggenheim Fellowship.

== Bibliography ==
- In Search of a Beautiful Freedom: New and Selected Essays (W.W. Norton & Company, 2023)
- Read Until You Understand: The Profound Wisdom of Black Life and Literature (W. W. Norton & Company, 2021)
- Harlem Nocturne: Women Artists and Progressive Politics During World War II (Basic Books, 2013)
- Clawing at the Limits of Cool: Miles Davis, John Coltrane, and the Greatest Jazz Collaboration Ever with Salim Washington (St. Martin's, 2008)
- Inclusive Scholarship: Developing Black Studies in the United States: A 25th Anniversary Retrospective of Ford Foundation Grant Making, 1982-2007 (Ford Foundation, 2007)
- Uptown Conversation: The New Jazz Studies, ed. with Robert G. O'Meally and Brent Hayes Edwards (Columbia University Press, 2004)
- If You Can't Be Free, Be a Mystery: In Search of Billie Holiday (Free Press, 2001)
- Beloved Sisters and Loving Friends: Letters from Rebecca Primus of Royal Oak, Maryland, and Addie Brown of Hartford, Connecticut, 1854-1868, ed. (Alfred A. Knopf, 1999)
- "Who Set You Flowin'?": The African-American Migration Narrative (Oxford University Press, 1995)
- References
