= Women's Joint Congressional Committee =

- Formation: 20th century
- Dissolved: 1970 (56 years ago)
- Type: Political
- Purpose: Women's rights
- Location: United States
- Affiliations: League of Women Voters; National Consumers' League; Women's Trade Union League

The Women's Joint Congressional Committee was an American coalition of existing women's rights organizations formed after women gained the right to vote in 1920, with the aim of coordinating lobbying around women's issues at the national level.

Active from 1920 to 1930, this umbrella organization included the League of Women Voters, the Women's Trade Union League, and the National Consumers' League, eventually coming to represent 12 million women.

== Formation ==
The committee was formed at the suggestion of Maud Wood Park, who was concerned that the passage of the 19th Amendment to the U.S. Constitution – prohibiting any U.S. citizen from being denied the right to vote on the basis of sex – might cause women to abandon the women's organizing groups and lead to greater political partisanship, and wanted instead to channel the existing organizing energy into continuing to lobby for women's interests.

As a national organization with members including both national organizations and local chapters, the committee formed several sub-committees around issues including infancy and maternity protection, independent citizenship for married women, regulation of the meat packing industry and child labor, social hygiene and education, and Prohibition.

== Influence ==
Called "the most powerful lobby in Washington", the committee used both grassroots and congressional lobbying to achieve their aims. It was at one point accused (along with many other organizations) of being a part of an international conspiracy to promote socialism in the U.S., an accusation which was refuted at length by Carrie Chapman Catt via an open letter in The Women Citizen. In her letter, Catt describes the structure and function of the committee,

"The committee, as such, initiates no policy and supports no legislation and no organization joining it is committed to any policy except that of cooperation, whenever possible. The members bring to it the endorsements of their organizations. After a measure has been endorsed by five or more member organizations of the committee, a sub-committee of representatives of endorsing organizations is organized, elects its officers and carries out a campaign of action for the enactment of the measure by the Congress."

The committee successfully used the rhetoric of maternalism to lobby for greater legal protections for women and children.

=== Legislation ===
An early success of the committee was the 1921 passage of the Promotion of the Welfare and Hygiene of Maternity and Infancy Act, also known as the Sheppard–Towner Act, which the committee was instrumental in getting passed.

The committee resisted the passage of the Equal Rights Amendment, concerned that it would undermine the protective labor legislation the committee had secured after years of work.

== Dissolution ==
The committee's influence and activity peaked in 1930, after which it lost most of its public and political support. It was dissolved in 1970.
