= Elizabeth Gilbert Jerome =

American artist (1824–1910)

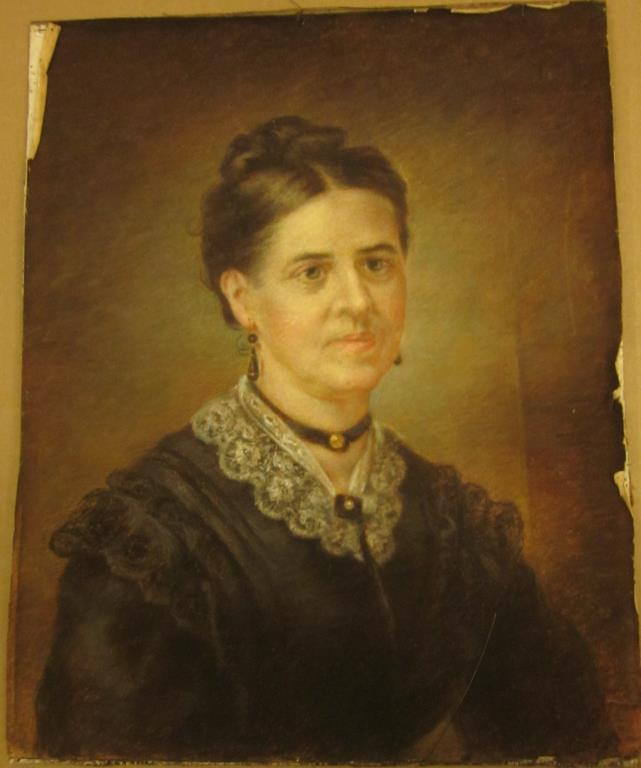
- Self portrait by Elizabeth Gilbert Jerome
- Born: 18 December 1824; New Haven, Connecticut
- Died: 22 April 1910 (aged 86); New Haven, Connecticut
- Occupation: Artist

Elizabeth Gilbert Jerome (1824–1910) was an American artist inspired by the Hudson River School. Her work included portraiture, still-lifes, and landscapes of South America.

== Personal life ==
Elizabeth Gilbert Jerome was born in New Haven, Connecticut in 1824. She was interested in art from an early age but her step-mother forbade her from making her own art, going so far as to destroy all her drawings when she was fifteen. At twenty-seven, Jerome was able to begin painting seriously. Jerome married at age thirty-two and made less art, but still worked. Her husband, Benjamin Jerome, was also an artist. She reportedly gave up painting after the death of a daughter, but took up miniature painting in 1904. Jerome continued to make small scale paintings until her death in 1910.

== Education and training ==
After moving to Hartford, Jerome began studying under Professor Julius T. Busch, who was pleased with her work and insisted she move to New York to further her education and career as an artist. She studied at the Springely Institute. When she was 30, she moved back to Hartford. For one year she studied at the National Academy of Design. She also studied under Emanuel Leutze. Her education enabled her to be an instructor and one of her pupils was Nelson A. Primus, an African American artist known for his portrait painting. She exhibited at the National Academy from 1866-1875 and at the Pennsylvania Academy of the Fine Arts in 1869.

== Works and influences ==
Jerome's work consisted of portraiture, and views of South America. Some speculate that she may have been directly influenced by Frederic Church, a fellow artist of The Hudson River School, because of the similarities between their South American landscapes. Church lived near Jerome in Hartford, but there was no evidence of whether she personally knew Church or not.

== List of works ==
- Self Portrait at 35, 1859
- Amos Gilbert at 10, 1870
- South American Sunset, 1870
- Tropical Landscape, 1870
- Louis Seymour, 1860–1880
- Sophie Ives in a Ball Dress, 1875
- Miss Charlotte Ely of Hartford, 1875
- Still Life with Fruit en Plein Air, 1881
