= Melrose High School (Massachusetts) =

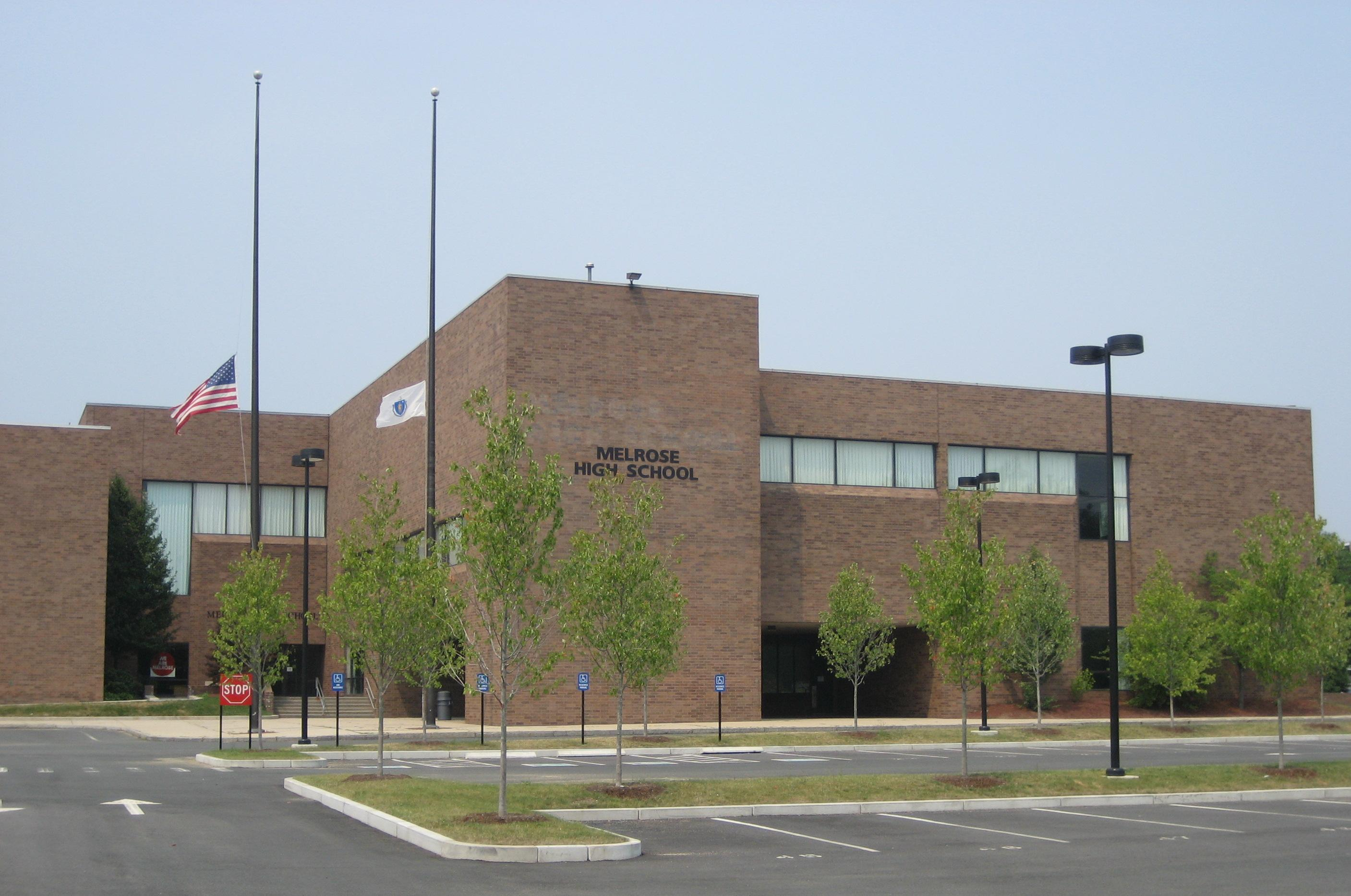

Location
- 360 Lynn Fells Parkway; Melrose, MA 02176; United States; 42°27′52″N 71°3′57″W

Information
- Type: Public; Open enrollment
- School district: Melrose Public Schools
- Principal: Jason Merrill
- Staff: 78.13 (FTE)
- Grades: 9–12
- Enrollment: 959 (2023-2024)
- Student to teacher ratio: 12.27
- Colors: Red & White
- Mascot: Red Hawk (formerly Red Raider, ret. 2022)
- School Type: Non-vocational high school
- Website: www.melroseschools.com/o/mhs

Melrose High School (MHS) is a public high school serving children in grades 9–12. It is located at 360 Lynn Fells Parkway in Melrose, Massachusetts, United States, and is Melrose's only high school. The school is accredited by the New England Association of Schools & Colleges (NEASC) and is a member of the METCO program.

== History ==
=== 1868–1897: first high school ===
Melrose High School began teaching children in the 1800s and has called several buildings home. The oldest known location is on West Emerson Street where the Melrose Public Library now stands. On March 30, 1868, Melrose appropriated $20,000 for the construction of the high school on a 30,000 sq ft (2,800 m^{2}) lot located on the corner of West Emerson Street and Lake Avenue. An Additional $7,500 was added to the price tag of the school on January 19, 1869 and on July 15, 1869, the school was finished and dedicated. Almost thirty years later, on January 25, 1897, a fire destroyed the building.

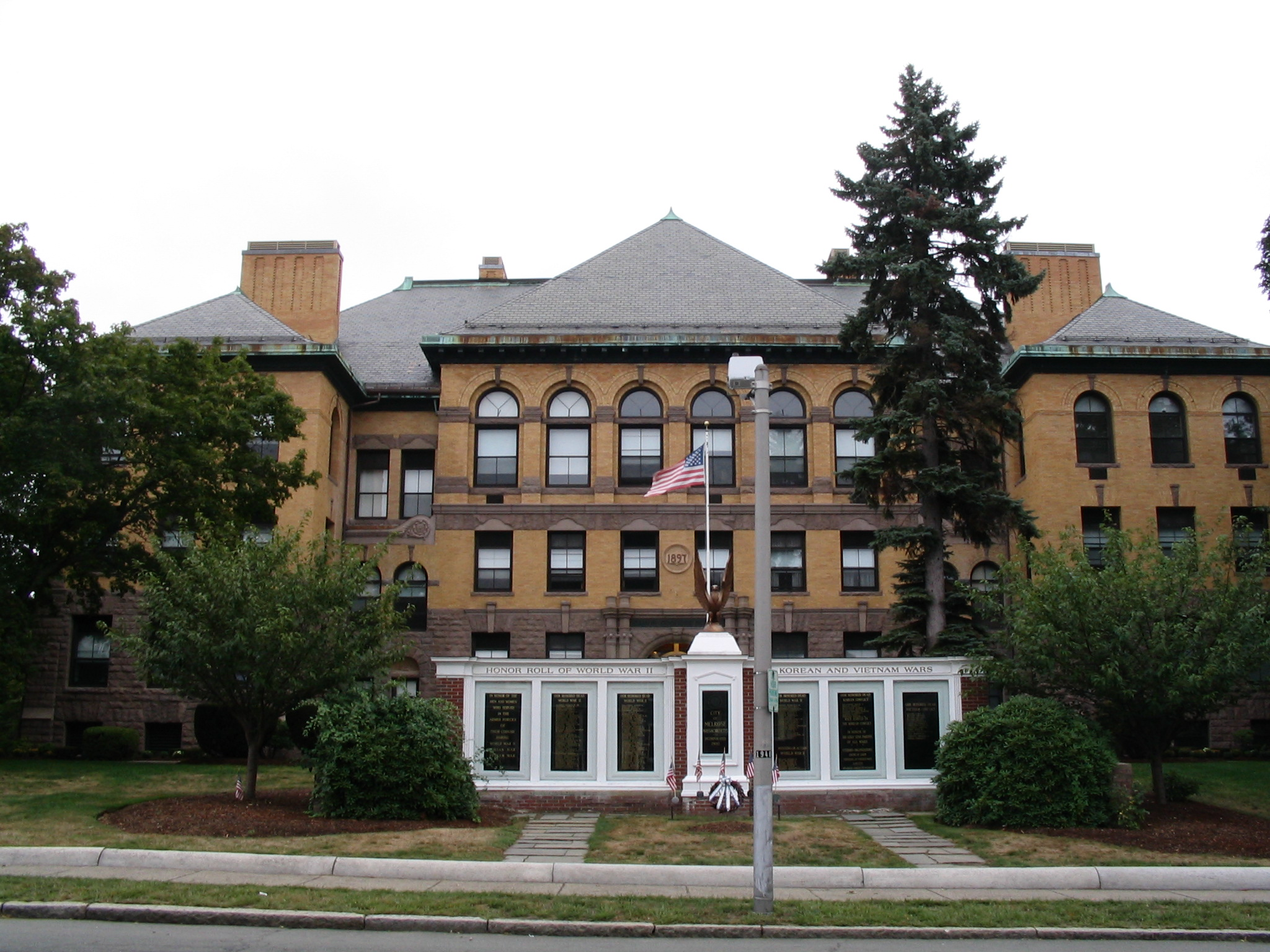
Melrose High School (1898–1931)

=== 1898–1931: second high school ===
The building on West Emerson Street quickly became too small for the growing community and so at the town meeting held on February 24, 1896, the town allocated $100,000 for the building of a new high school. The town selected a lot of land known as the "Old Burial Ground" on Main Street across from the Central Fire Station as the location for the new school building. On August 1, 1898, an additional $3,000 was appropriated for site work around the building. The school was dedicated on September 17, 1898 and at the time, was one of the "finest school buildings to be found in New England." Two additional wings were added to the main building and opened in 1909.

=== 1932–1974: third high school ===
Melrose High School (1932–1974)

In 1932, another new school was built and the previous school building became the Calvin Coolidge Elementary School. This time the new building was built on swamp land taken from Ell Pond on Lynn Fells Parkway. It was a very large school, featuring a 900-seat Auditorium and a full size gymnasium. 1961 saw the addition of the Daffinee Gymnasium which contained new locker rooms for both basketball and football and also extra classroom space. The addition also included the construction of a three-floor annex attached by a bridge. Many historians praised the main building for its period design and architectural beauty.

=== 1975–2004: fourth high school ===
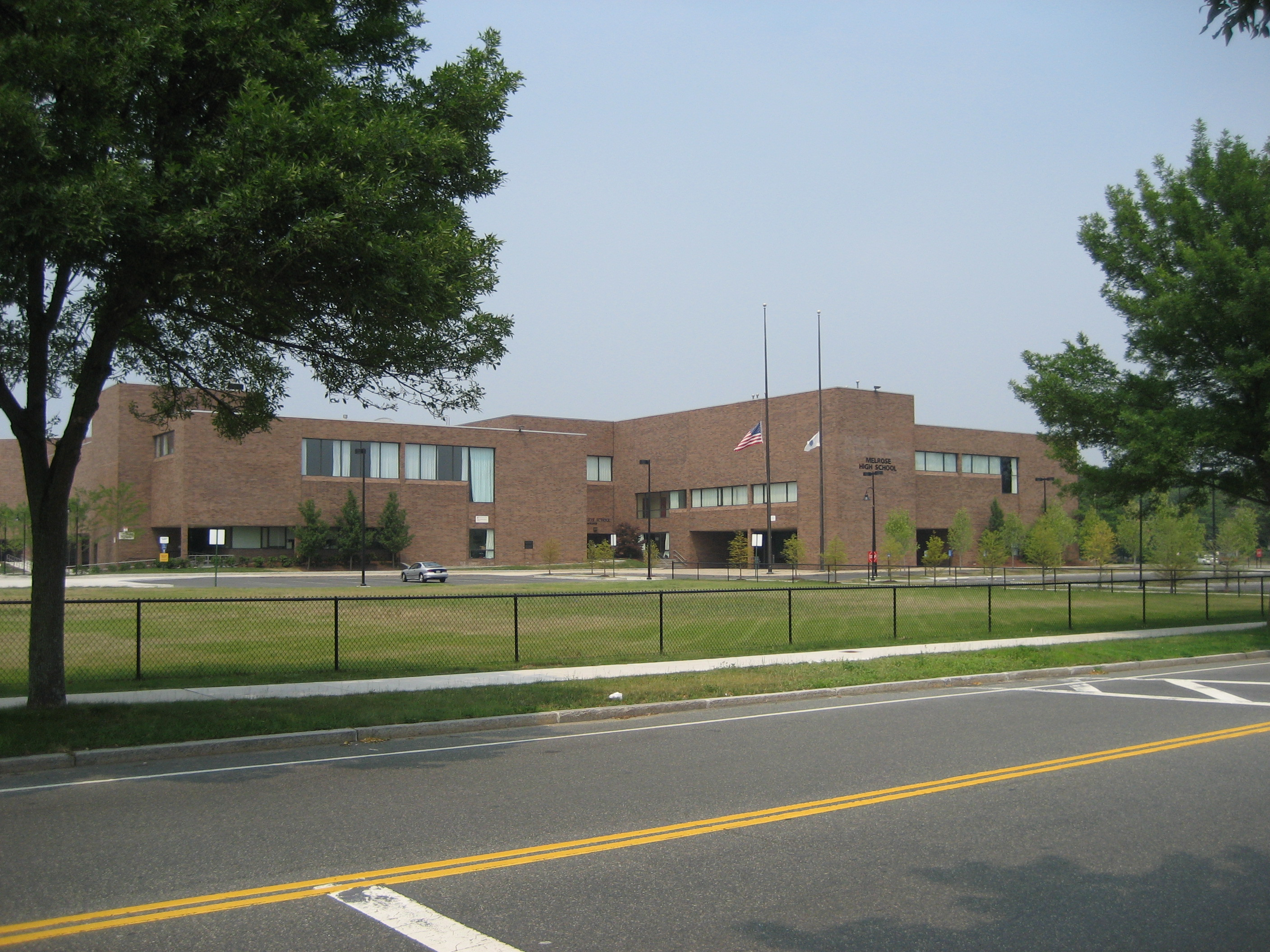
Melrose High School (1975–present)

In 1975, a new "modern" Melrose High School opened next-door to the old one, which became the middle school. This building is renowned for its "open spaces," which were large open areas with movable walls. Less than half of the buildings classrooms were in open spaces and the rest were triangular in shape. The school was supposedly built by an architect who also designed prisons and the building style reflects this. Numerous classrooms contain no windows and masonry is the main building material. Windows appear in a select few classrooms and are plentiful, yet most don't open. There is a constantly running air circulation system to combat the window problem and to cool the building in the summer.

=== 2005–present: renovations ===
In the summer of 2005, walls were constructed in the second- and third-floor open spaces creating fourteen separate classrooms. The work was done in conjunction with the project to build a new middle school on the site of the third high school and done as a requirement of an NEASC accreditation report. For two years while the construction of the new middle school occurred, eighth-graders occupied the new classrooms. After the summer of 2007, regular high school classes resumed in the former open space.

On October 16, 2007, Mayor Robert Dolan announced that the building would undergo major renovations within the next four years. The $3–4 million renovation will include the installation of "SmartBoards" in all 78 classrooms, improved lighting, roof replacement, and repainting the entire school. The first phase, constructed in the summer of 2008, cost $1.44 million and was for the installation and purchase of the SmartBoards and the electrical work needed to accommodate the additional technology for the boards. This phase also added or improved internet, phone, and cable television connections throughout the school. By September 4, 2008, 70 fixed position SmartBoards and four portable ones were ready for use.

During the 2012–13 school year, the high school underwent major renovation of its science classrooms. The school put money into replacing all of its dated science classrooms with ones that include updated appliances and labs. The classrooms were finished and ready for use in September 2013. The newly renovated classrooms were completed with new computers and state of the art labs.

== School life ==
The school has several successful sports programs, the most notable being the success of the football, volleyball, wrestling and boys and girls lacrosse. In 2017, 2020, 2022, and 2023, the wrestling team won the Division 3 State Championship(s), with multiple individual state champions as well. The 2017 and 2019 football teams won the Division 4 State Championship(s) after going 13-0 and 12-0 respectively. From 2018 to 2021, the program boasted a 21-game win streak. Also notable are the school's wide array of clubs, many of which are active within the community.

== Notable alumni and faculty ==
- Jalen Adams (born 1995), basketball player for Hapoel Jerusalem in the Israeli Basketball Premier League
- Jane F. Desforges (1921–2013), hematologist
- Elizabeth Dole, worked as a student teacher at MHS during the 1959–60 school year.
- Ryan Johnson, 2002 graduate, plays Major League Soccer for the San Jose Earthquakes.
- Sheylani "Shey" Marie Peddy (born 1988), basketball player.
- Frantzdy Pierrot, 2014 graduate, professional soccer player for AEK Athens in the Super League Greece.
- John Quinlan, model and actor, former professional wrestler
- Ken Reid, 1998 graduate, stand up comedian.
- Edna Lamprey Stantial, suffragist and archivist
- Garrett Swasey (1971–2015) was a competitive ice skater, figure skating coach, and police officer.
- Barbara Weeks was a film actress in the 1930s–1950s.
- Andy Brickley (class of 1979) played 14 seasons of professional hockey, including four with the Boston Bruins, and currently serves as the color commentator for the Boston Bruins on the New England Sports Network.
