= Nelson A. Primus =

African-American painter

- Born: March 25, 1842; Hartford, Connecticut
- Died: May 29, 1916 (aged 74); San Francisco, California
- Occupation: Artist
- Known for: Portrait painting
- Notable work: The Fortune Teller, 1898

Nelson A. Primus (1842–1916) was an African-American artist, known for his portrait painting.

== Biography ==
Nelson Augustus Primus was born March 25, 1842, in Hartford, Connecticut. He was the only son of Mehitable (Jacobs), a dressmaker and Holdridge Primus, a grocery store clerk at R.S and G. Seyms Co. He had three sisters, Rebecca, Henrietta, and Isabella "Bell". Mehitable was the granddaughter of Jeremiah Jacobs, the head of the first black family to settle in Hartford. Along with her dressmaking business, she managed an employment service, finding domestics and seamstresses for local employers. Gad Asher, Holdridge's maternal grandfather, gained his freedom from slavery through his service in the American Revolutionary War.

Primus's artistic talents were recognized early in his life. He won a drawing award twice at the Hartford County Fair, first when he was nine years old and the second time when he was seventeen. When he was fifteen, Primus was apprenticed to carriage painter, George Francis. Later, he studied art with Elizabeth Gilbert Jerome, a local portrait artist.

On June 18, 1864, Primus married Amoretta Prime, of Norfolk, Connecticut. Their daughter Leila was born six months later, on December 22, 1864. In the spring of 1865, the family moved to Boston so that Primus could study art and find work as an artist. He first studied art with Edward Mitchell Bannister, a prominent African-American portrait painter and landscape artist. Primus stayed with Bannister only three months, as he felt the older artist was not interested in promoting the younger artist's work. He went on to study with lithographer, Charles Stetfield, who worked in the same building as Bannister. Stetfield was not as talented as Bannister, but he was a better teacher and mentor.

Nelson worked part-time as a carriage painter, general painter, photo colorist, and waiter. He painted portraits when he was not working day-jobs, and often struggled to sell his work. His parents were supportive of Primus' aspirations and helped the family financially, often sending gifts of money or food. In July 1876, Primus' wife, Amoretta, died from complications of childbirth. He remarried Mary G. Wheeler of Nantucket, MA in 1877. In 1893, his daughter, Leila, died of pneumonia.

In 1895, Primus and his wife Mary moved to the west coast, initially living in Seattle for a few years. Several portraits from that time period have been identified as Primus's work. The couple moved to San Francisco, California sometime around 1900, living near Chinatown. He worked at a delicatessen, and in his free time, he painted cityscapes, landscapes and portraits. While in San Francisco, he created Fortune Teller in 1898, a realistic portrayal of life in San Francisco in the late 1800s. Many of Primus's paintings were lost in the 1906 earthquake in San Francisco.

By 1910, Primus's wife, Mary had died. Very little is known of his life after 1910. He died of tuberculosis on May 29, 1916, in a San Francisco hospital.

== Gallery ==
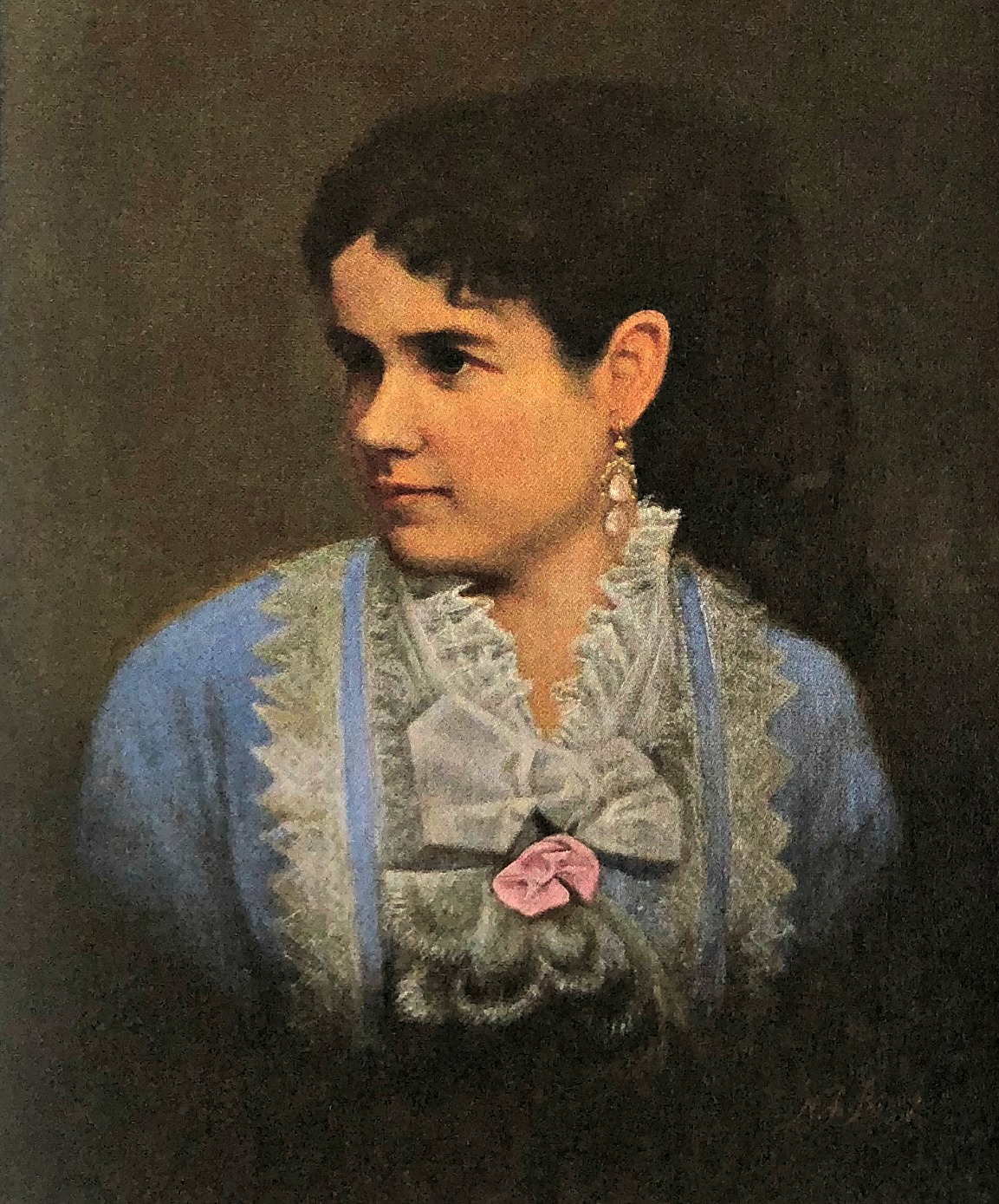
Lizzy May Ulmer, 1876

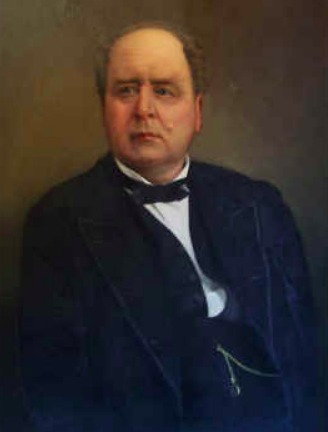
Nehemiah Gibson, 1883

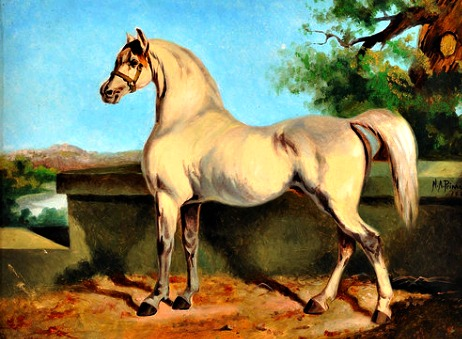
Landscape with horse, 1884

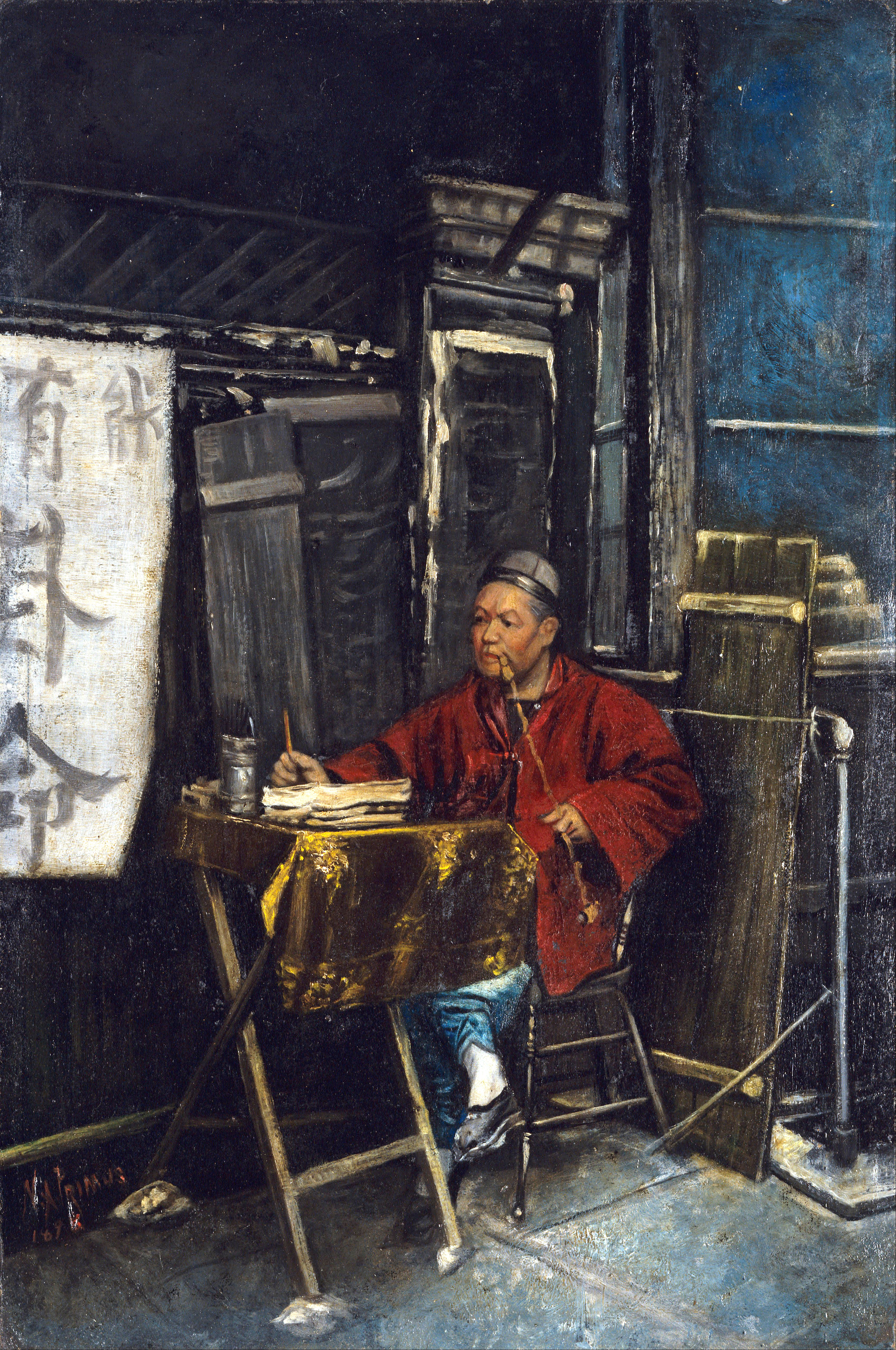
Fortune Teller, 1898
