= Jeremiah Asher =

American cleric

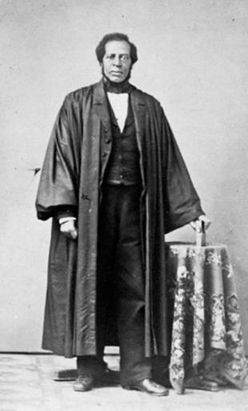
- Asher in 1863
- Born: October 13, 1812; North Branford, New Haven County, Connecticut, US
- Died: July 27, 1865 (aged 52); Wilmington, North Carolina, US
- Occupation: Chaplain

Jeremiah Asher was an American cleric who was responsible for the placement of African-American chaplains in the Union Army during the American Civil War. He became the first African-American chaplain to die while in active U.S. military service.

Asher was born on October 13, 1812, in North Branford, New Haven County, Connecticut, to free parents, Reuel and Jerusha Asher. Reuel's father was an African named Gad who, at the age of four, had been captured on the coast of Guinea and shipped to captivity in Connecticut. Purchased by a ship carpenter named Titus Bishop in Connecticut, Gad was treated relatively well as a slave. After some forty years of bondage he was offered his freedom if he would fight in the American Revolution. Gad seized the opportunity, fighting in numerous battles. Yet Bishop broke his promise to Gad, forcing the slave to purchase his freedom, which he did. In addition, the U.S. government paid Gad a pension of $96 annually for the remainder of his life for fighting in the army.

Jeremiah Asher, a third-generation free man, married Abigail Stewart on May 13, 1830, in Hartford, Connecticut. In March of 1839, he was licensed to preach at the First Baptist Church of Hartford. The now Reverend Asher began preaching at the Meeting Street Baptist Church, in Providence, Rhode Island, where he stayed for nine years at a salary of $300 per year. It was there that he rose to national prominence. In the early spring of 1848, he resigned from the Meeting Street Baptist Church. His first stop, after leaving Providence, was in Washington, D.C., where he became the first ordained pastor of the Second (Colored) Baptist Church in early 1849. He only stayed there for three months or so, however. After leaving Washington, DC, he went to Philadelphia, where he pastored at the Shiloh Baptist Church.

In 1863, Rev. Asher co-founded the Shiloh Baptist Church in Yorktown, Virginia, with John Carey, a former slave. He named this church after his former church in Philadelphia. In that same year, Rev. Asher wrote to President Abraham Lincoln, requesting that Black ministers be allowed to serve as chaplains in the Union Army during the Civil War. President Lincoln agreed, and, at age 50 and with the support of all the white officers in the regiment, Rev. Asher became chaplain of the 6th Regiment U.S. Colored Troops. He was one of only fourteen Black ministers in the entire Union Army to be assigned as chaplain.

On July 27, 1865, Rev. Asher died of typhoid fever in Wilmington, North Carolina, having contracted the disease while ministering to sick soldiers. Jeremiah Asher became the first African-American chaplain to die in U.S. military service. He is buried in Philadelphia.
