= Zion Hill Cemetery (Hartford, Connecticut) =

Cemetery in Hartford, Connecticut, United States

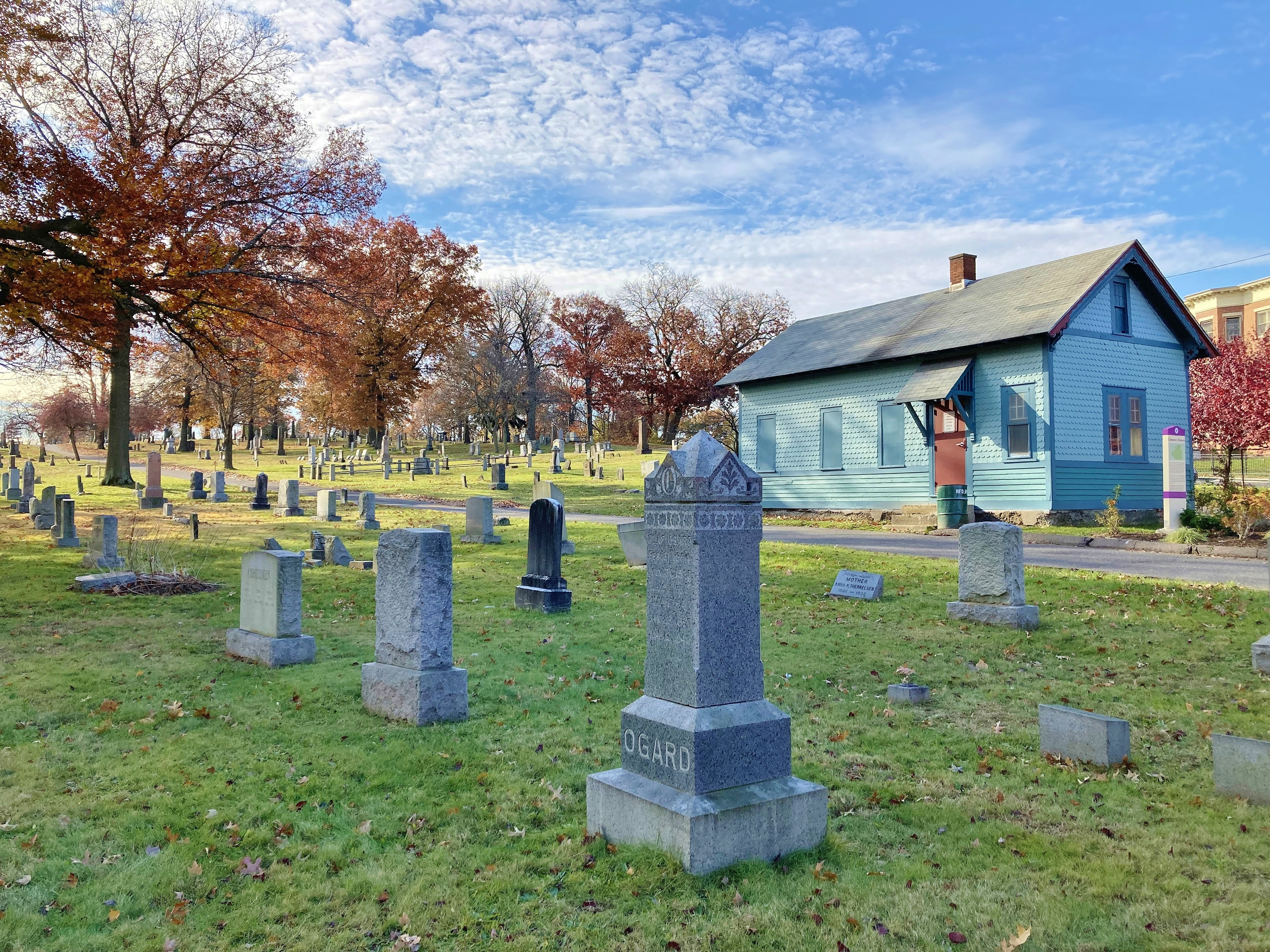
- Caretaker's Cottage (November 2021)
- Interactive map of Zion Hill Cemetery

Details
- Established: circa 1840
- Location: 520 Zion Street, Hartford, Connecticut
- Country: United States
- Coordinates: 41.754°N 72.691°W
- Size: 24 acres (9.7 ha)
- No. of interments: 14,000
- Find a Grave: Zion Hill Cemetery

Zion Hill Cemetery is a city-owned cemetery that was established in the 1840s, which is located at Ward and Zion Streets in the Frog Hollow neighborhood of Hartford, Connecticut.

== Description and history ==
Zion Hill Cemetery was known originally as Zion's Hill Cemetery. Established in the 1840s on what was then farmland, the cemetery was expanded southward in the early 1900s to encompass an area called Mount Pleasant. The cemetery has one of the highest elevations within the city of Hartford. The southern edge of the cemetery abuts the campus of Trinity College.

Within the 24-acre bounds of Zion Hill Cemetery, there are several small, independently managed Jewish cemeteries dating back to the 1880s. A now-abandoned red brick building on the property is the historic Deborah Chapel, a Jewish mortuary constructed in 1886 where bodies of the dead were prepared for burial according to Jewish custom.

Early on, Zion Hill was touted as one of the most beautiful cemeteries in New England. However, the cemetery has long been the site of vandalism and criminal activity, including a fire in 1870, arrests for drunkenness and vagrancy dating back to 1905, the toppling of a monument in 1915, the smashing of glass panes by teens in 1950, and the destruction of numerous headstones throughout the years. in recent years, a local group has been working to rehabilitate the property.

Significant burial plots in the cemetery include those of 201 men who fought in the Civil War and veterans of other U.S. wars.

== Photo Gallery ==
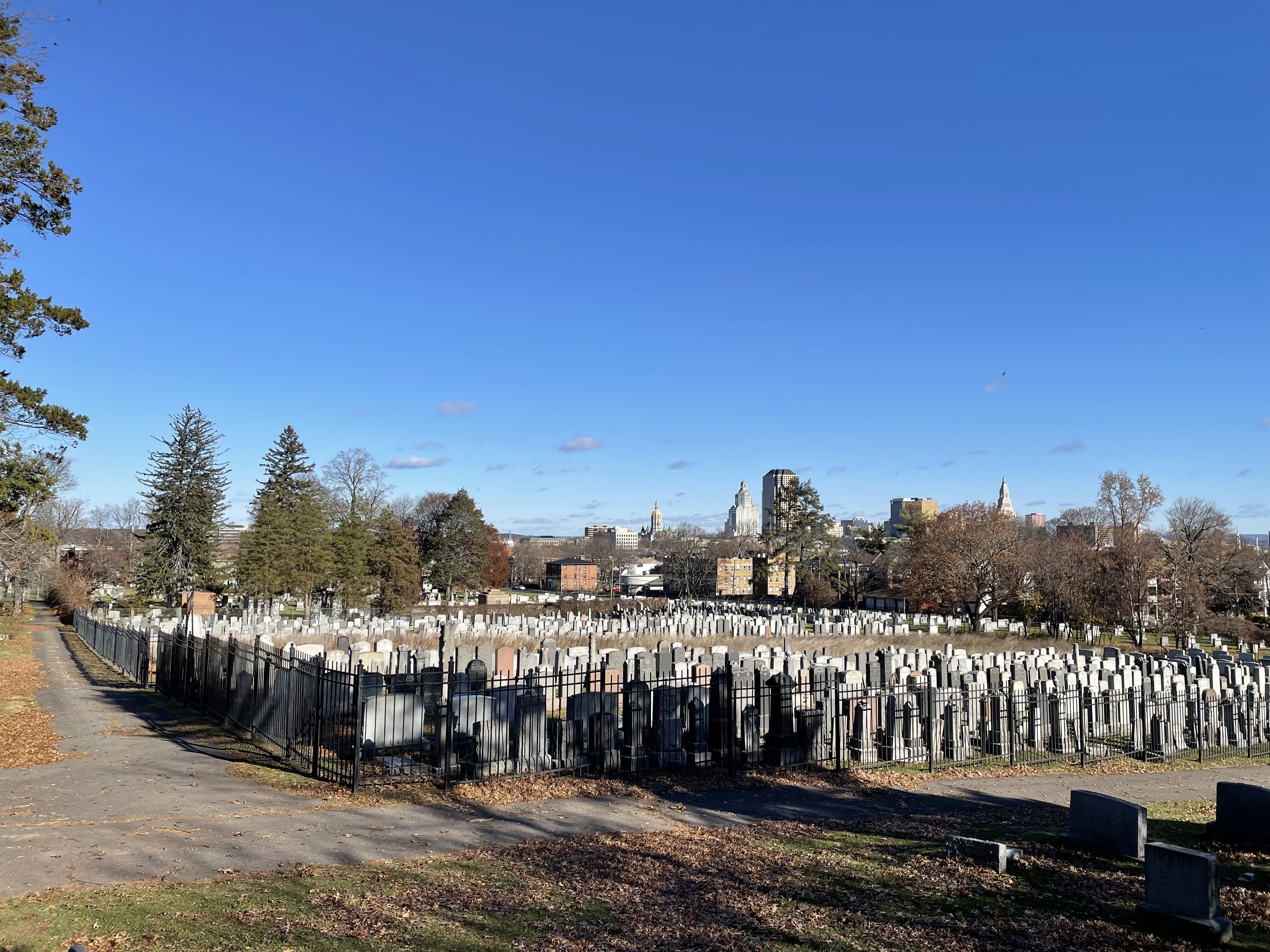
Jewish Section of Zion Hill Cemetery, with downtown Hartford in the distance (November 2021)

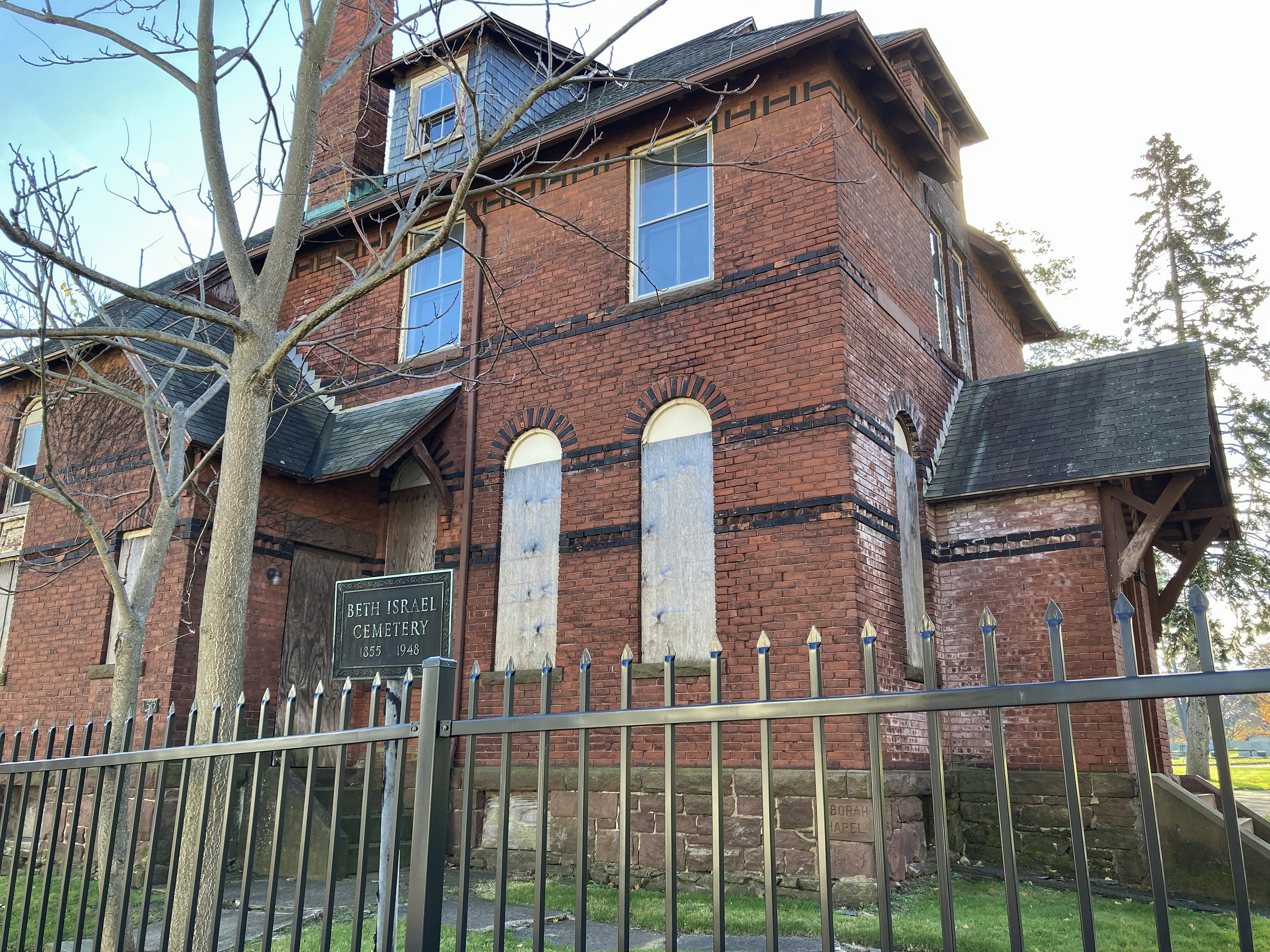
Deborah Chapel (November 2021)

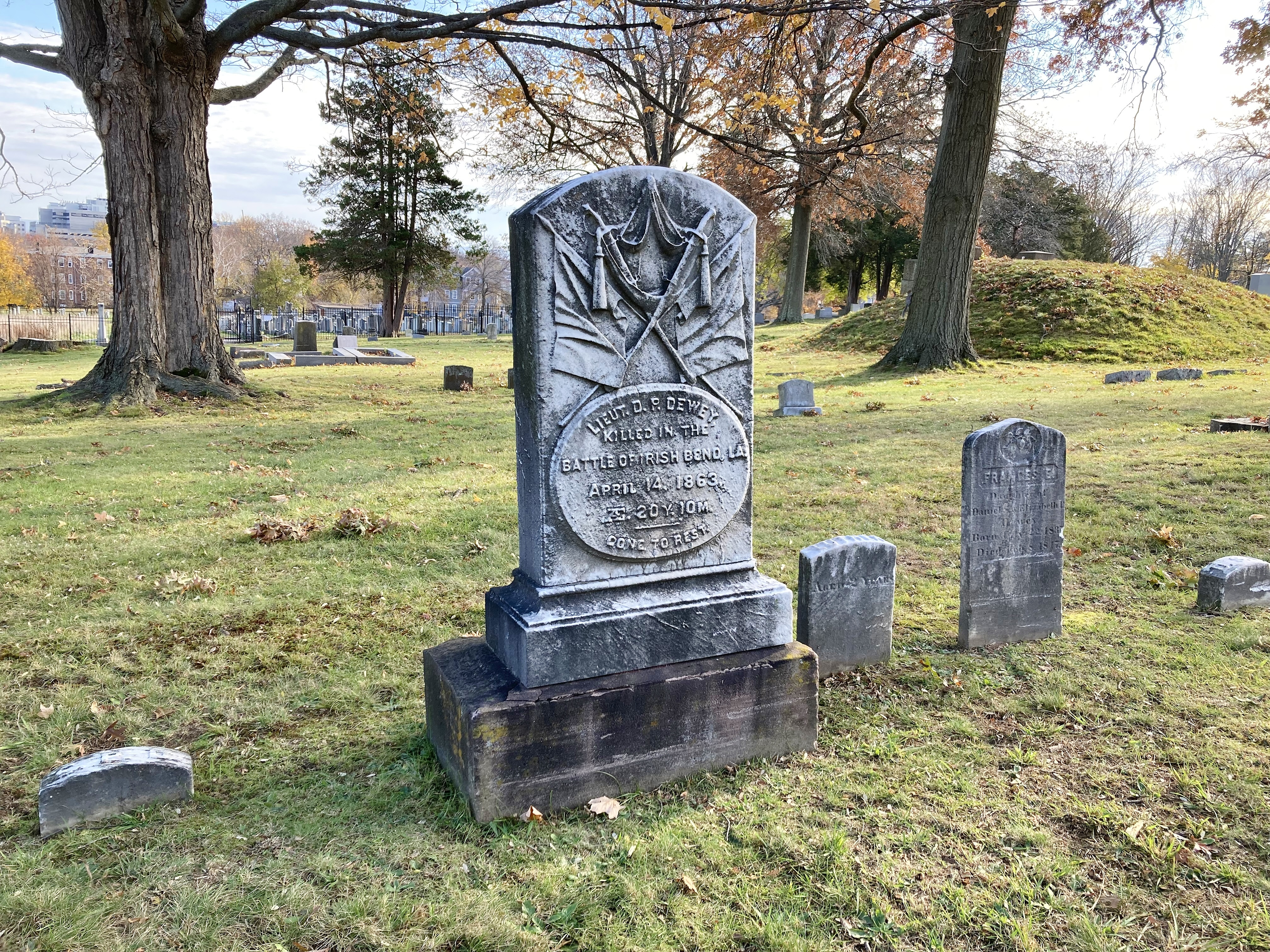
Civil War Soldier's gravestone (November 2021)

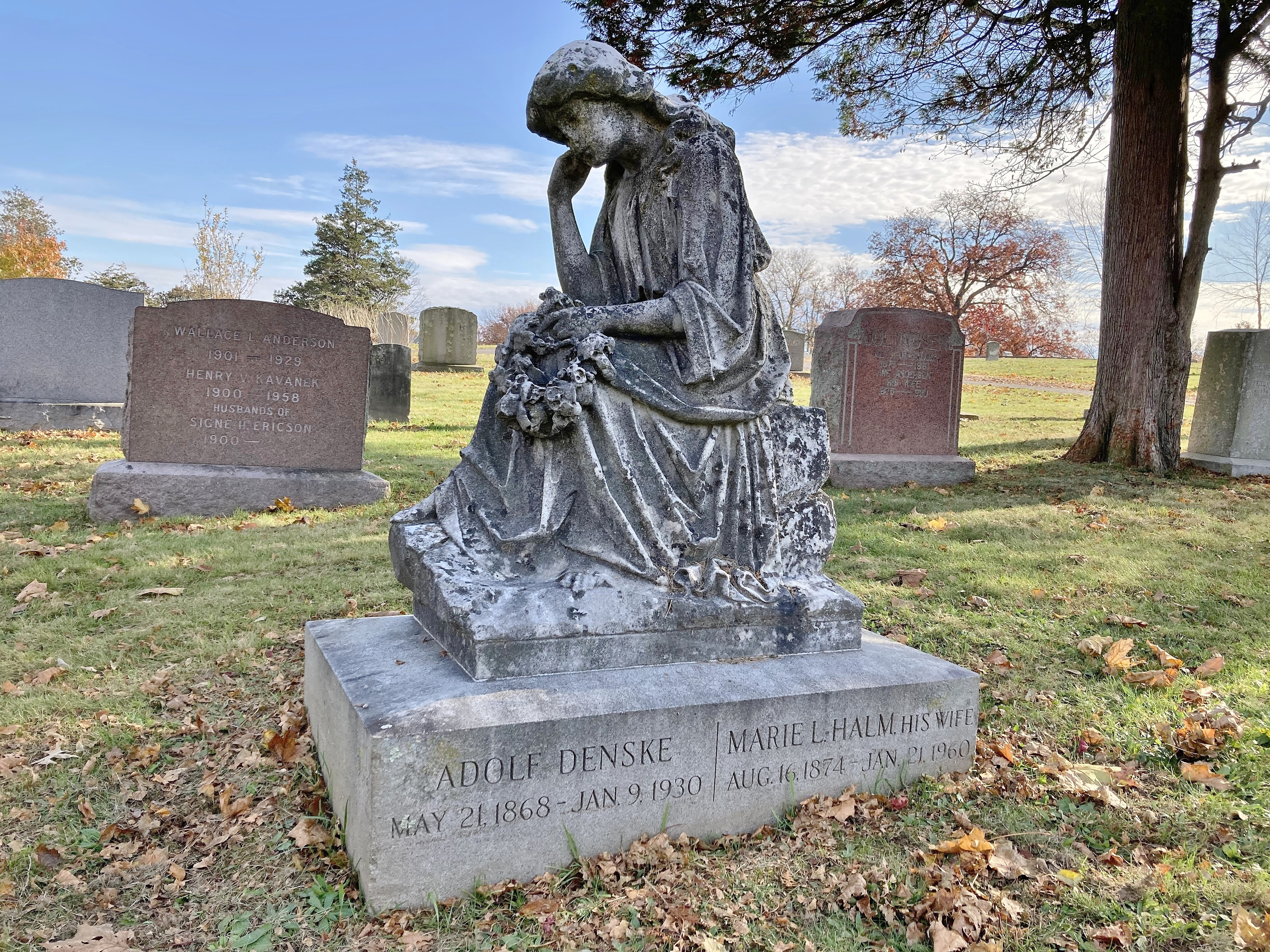
Monument at Zion Hill Cemetery (November 2021)
