= Elizabeth Bancroft Schlesinger =

American suffragist (1886–1977)

Elizabeth Bancroft Schlesinger (July 3, 1886 – June 3, 1977) was an American suffragist, civic leader, feminist, and pioneer in the field of women's history.

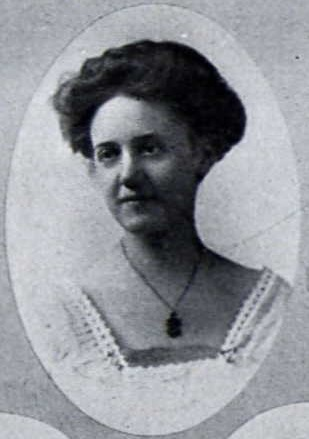
Elizabeth Bancroft in 1910

== Early years and family ==
Elizabeth Bancroft Schlesinger was born in Columbus, Ohio to Clara Weilnman Bancroft and Arthur Bancroft. She was the eldest of three children. Her siblings were Clara L. Bancroft (1888-1903) and William H. Bancroft (1891-??). Clara Weilnman Bancroft and Arthur Bancroft divorced when the children were young, and Clara Weilnman Bancroft began working for the Veterans Bureau, first in Columbus, Ohio, and later in Washington D.C.

== Education ==
Elizabeth Bancroft Schlesinger graduated from Ohio State University in 1910. She was active in student life at Ohio State University participating in the Glee Club, the Y.W.C.A Cabinet, the Lantern (school newspaper), History Club, Pi Beta Phi and serving as a board member for the Makio (university yearbook). She intermittently taught in a one-room country school to support herself during college. After graduating, she began teaching History and English in Central High School, Kalamazoo, Michigan. In 1914 she left teaching to marry Arthur M. Schlesinger, who she had met during college. They had two sons, Arthur M. Schlesinger, Jr and Thomas Bancroft. The family lived in Columbus, Ohio until 1919 when they moved to Iowa so that Arthur M. Schlesinger could assume a position at the State University of Iowa. In 1924 they settled in Cambridge, Massachusetts where Arthur M. Schlesinger was appointed professor of history at Harvard.

== Civic engagement and writing ==
Elizabeth Bancroft Schlesinger was active in many civic organizations focused on women's rights and teaching. While living in Columbus, Ohio, she was active in the Franklin County Suffrage Association and the General Federation of Women's Clubs. In 1916, she also served as North-side Vice President in the Columbus Housewives League, which organized to fight the high cost of food staples like butter, eggs, and meat.

In Cambridge, Massachusetts, Elizabeth Bancroft Schlesinger was part of the Cambridge League of Women Voters in the post of Chairman of the Committee on Education and served on the boards of the Cambridge Public Library and the American Association of University Women of Boston. The U.S. Office of Education appointed Elizabeth Bancroft Schlesinger to a committee to interview teachers who applied to teach abroad.

== History and women's history ==
Elizabeth Bancroft Schlesinger made substantial contributions to historiography in the fields of history and women's history. She was actively involved with the administrative and intellectual lives of the Radcliffe College Women's Archives, serving on the Archives Advisory Board along with her husband Arthur M. Schlesinger, who chaired the Board for sixteen years. Elizabeth Bancroft Schlesinger also regularly contributed papers to the Women's Archives seminars on women's history and to the Mother's Study Club. In honor of their commitment to the Women's Archives, which is recognized as one of the preeminent locations for the study of United States women's history, the archives were renamed the Arthur and Elizabeth Schlesinger Library on the History of Women in America in 1965. Arthur M. Schlesinger Jr. attributed his mother as a strong influence on the political views and historical work of Arthur M. Schlesinger Sr. who is noted as one of the first scholars "to draw the attention of the historical profession and the public to "The Role of Women in American History.""

Elizabeth Bancroft Schlesinger was a frequent reviewer for the New England Quarterly and published numerous articles on American women in historical journals and national magazines. She was also a contributor to the first volume of Radcliffe's prominent Notable American Women: A Biographical Dictionary. An abbreviated list of her publications is as follows:

- "They Say Women are Emancipated" The New Republic December 13, 1933
- "The Women's Magazines" The New Republic March 11, 1946
- Fanny Fern : Our Grandmothers' Mentor. New York: New York Historical Society Quarterly, 1954.
- "Proper Bostonians as Seen by Fanny Fern." New England Quarterly: A Historical Review of New
- The Alcotts through Thirty Years : Letters to Alfred Whitman. Cambridge, Mass: Harvard University Library, 1957.
- "The Philosopher's Wife and the Wolf at the Door." American Heritage 8 (1957): 32–35.
- The Nineteenth-Century Woman's Dilemma and Jennie June. New York State Historical Association, 1961.
- Two Early Harvard Wives: Eliza Farrar and Eliza Follen. Portland, Me 1965, 1965.

== Death ==
Following Arthur M. Schlesinger's death in 1965, Elizabeth Bancroft Schlesinger continued to live and work in Cambridge, MA. In 1975, after having lived in Cambridge, MA for more than fifty years, she moved to Williamsburg, Virginia to live with her son, Thomas Schlesinger. Elizabeth Bancroft Schlesinger died in Williamsburg, Virginia in 1977 at the age of 90. Her obituary in the New York Times notes that "In her 20s Mrs. Schlesinger marched as a pre-World War suffragette; in her 80s she marched with her granddaughters in Vietnam War protests." A small collection of Elizabeth Bancroft Schlesinger's papers is held at the Schlesinger Library on the History of Women in America.
