= Karen Hansen =

American writer

Karen V. Hansen (born 1955) is an American writer and professor emerita of sociology and women's and gender studies at Brandeis University. Her books include Encounter on the Great Plains and Working-Class Kids and Visionary Educators in a Multiracial High School.

== Biography ==
Hansen was born in Chico, California, and received her BA from the University of California, Santa Barbara and her PhD from the University of California, Berkeley. She received an Honorary Doctorate of Philosophy, Doctorem Philosophiae Honoris Causa, from the University of Southern Denmark, Odense. As the Victor and Gwendolyn Beinfield Professor of Sociology she taught at Brandeis University for thirty-five years in Sociology, Women's, Gender, & Sexuality Studies, and History. Hansen held the Fulbright Distinguished Chair of American Studies at Uppsala University, Sweden, in 2015-16.

Her latest book, Working-Class Kids and Visionary Educators in a Multiracial High School: A Story of Belonging (Bloomsbury, 2024), focuses on a public high school in California. Inspired by a shared vision, teachers at Sunnyvale High School (1956-1981) collaborated to give each student a reason to engage, offered them a wealth of leadership roles, and established an enduring school-wide culture of pride and belonging.

Encounter on the Great Plains (Oxford University Press, 2013), was published after 15 years of research and writing, and a dozen trips to North Dakota. Hansen's interest in the nexus of community and inequality was the starting point of this study of the Spirit Lake Dakota Indian Reservation in the early twentieth century. Scandinavian homesteaders took land on the reservation and became both the neighbors of Dakota Sioux and usurpers of their land. Encounter chronicles the processes that created ethnically mixed communities and mingled the separate and intertwining stories of Dakotas and immigrants—women and men, farmers, domestic servants, and day laborers—and their shared struggles to maintain a language, practice a culture, and honor loyalties to more than one nation. The project has received fellowship support from the John Simon Guggenheim Memorial Foundation and the National Endowment for the Humanities. Hansen was a visiting scholar at the Charles Warren Center for Studies in American History at Harvard University.

Her previous books include A Very Social Time: Crafting Community in Antebellum New England (California, 1995), Not-So-Nuclear Families: Gender, Class, and Networks of Care (Rutgers, 2005), and several anthologies, including most recently, At the Heart of Work and Family: Engaging the Concepts of Arlie Hochschild (Rutgers, 2011).
