= Schlesinger Library =

Research library at the Radcliffe Institute for Advanced Study, Harvard University

Coordinates: 42°22′32.7″N 71°7′23.2″W

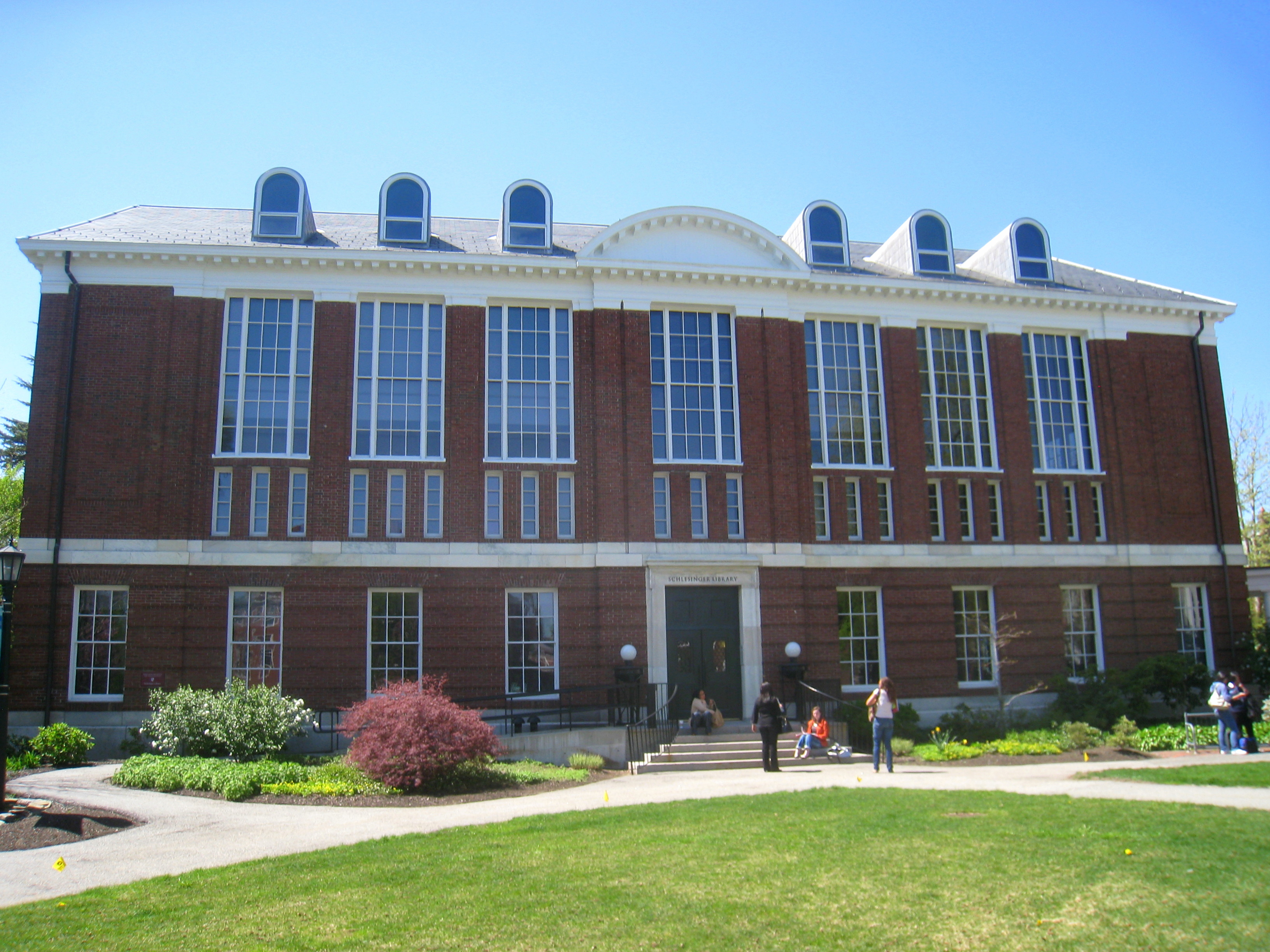
Schlesinger Library

The Arthur and Elizabeth Schlesinger Library on the History of Women in America is a research library at Harvard Radcliffe Institute at Harvard University. According to Nancy F. Cott, the Carl and Lily Pforzheimer Foundation Director, it is "the largest and most significant repository of documents covering women's lives and activities in the United States".

== History ==
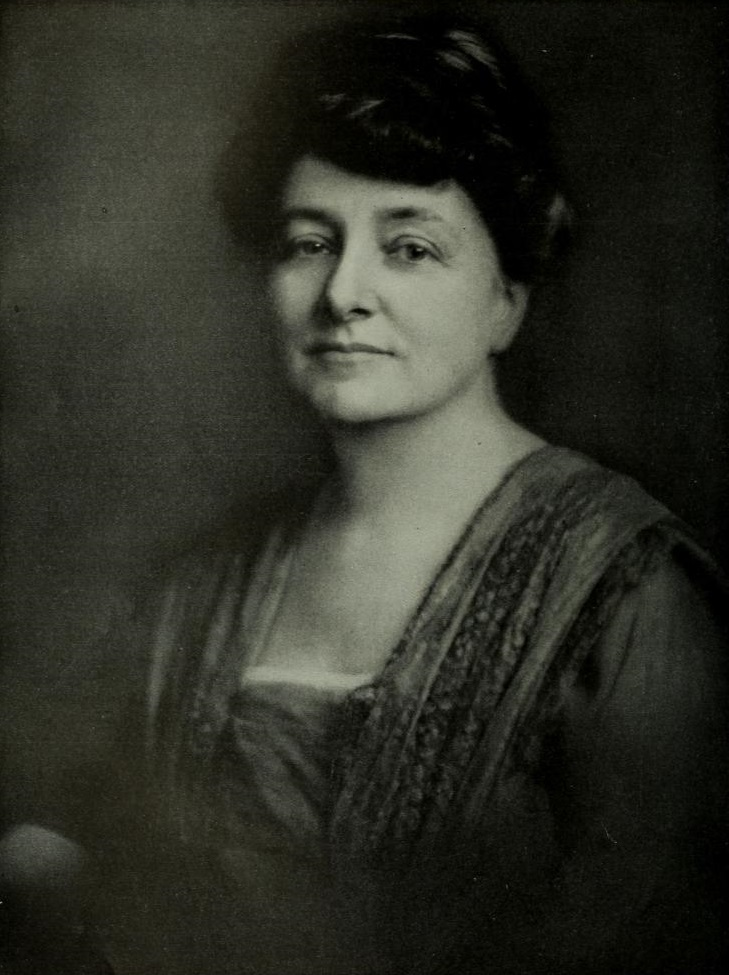
Maud Wood Park

In 1905, Andrew Carnegie gave Radcliffe College $73,900 to build a library. Henry Forbes Bigelow, a Boston architect, was hired to design the library which was built in 1906.

On August 26, 1943, the Radcliffe College alumna Maud Wood Park '98, a former suffragist, donated her collection of books, papers, and memorabilia on female reformers to Radcliffe. This grew into a research library called the Women's Archives, It was renamed in 1965 in honor of Elizabeth Bancroft Schlesinger (1886-1977) and her husband Arthur M. Schlesinger (1888-1965), as they were strong supporters of the library's mission.

Arthur was a historian and author who taught at Harvard University for thirty years (1924-1954). Elizabeth was a feminist and civic activist and served on the library's advisory board.

=== Purpose ===
The Schlesinger Library exists to document women's lives and endeavors. Its resources document the range of women's activities at home in the United States and abroad from the early 19th century to the present day.

== Collections ==
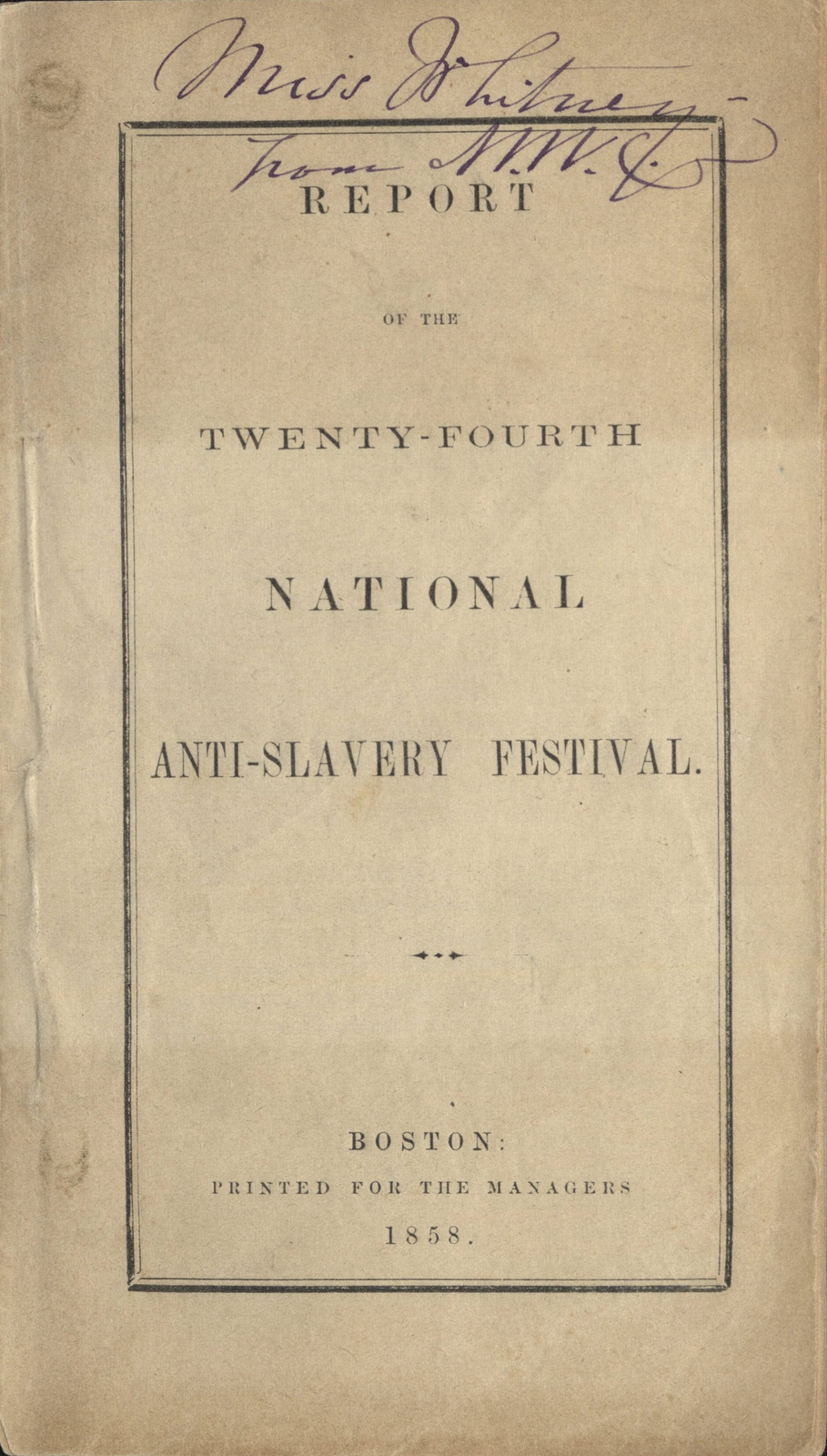
Cover page of the report for the 24th National Anti-slavery Bazaar-festival

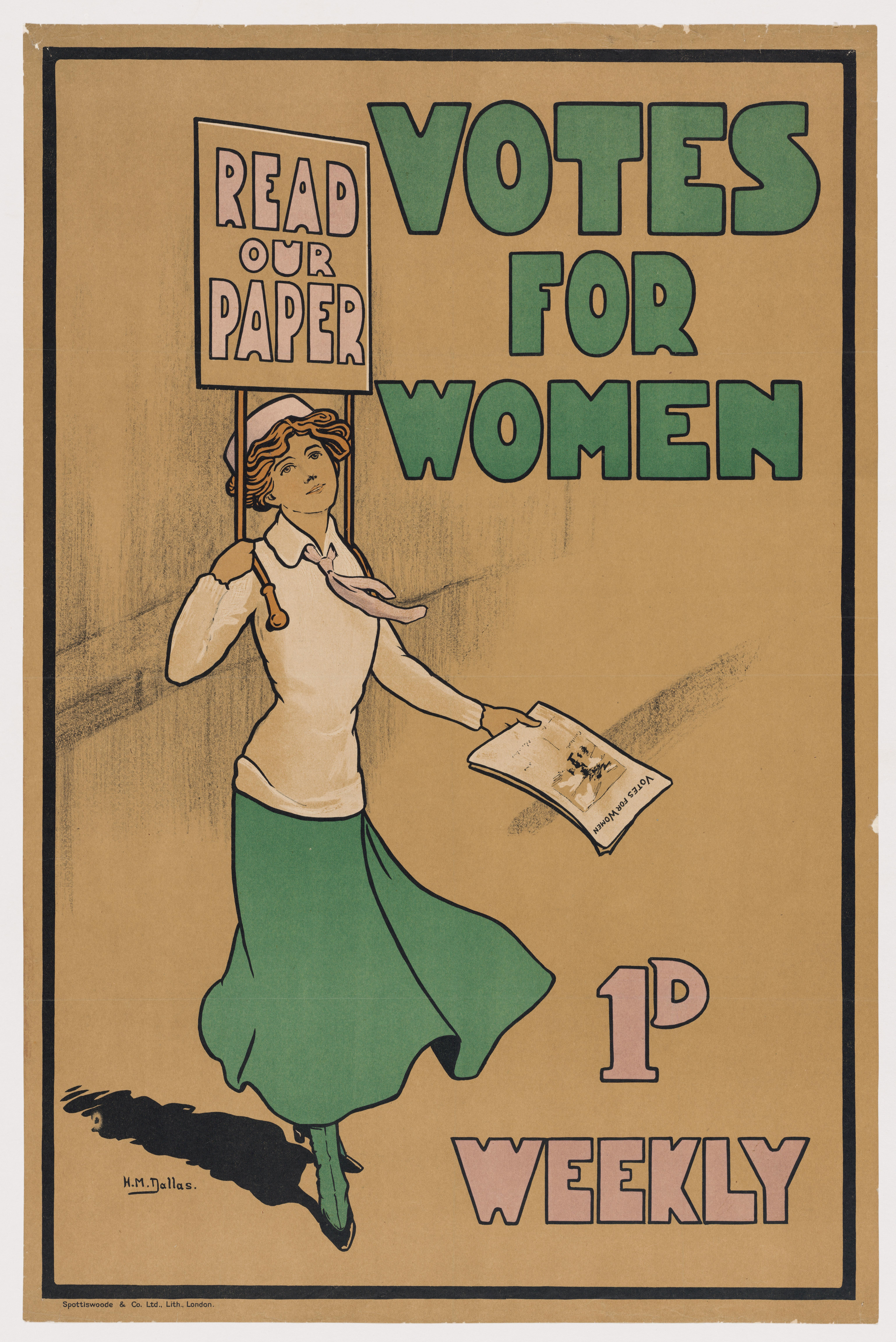
Suffrage poster

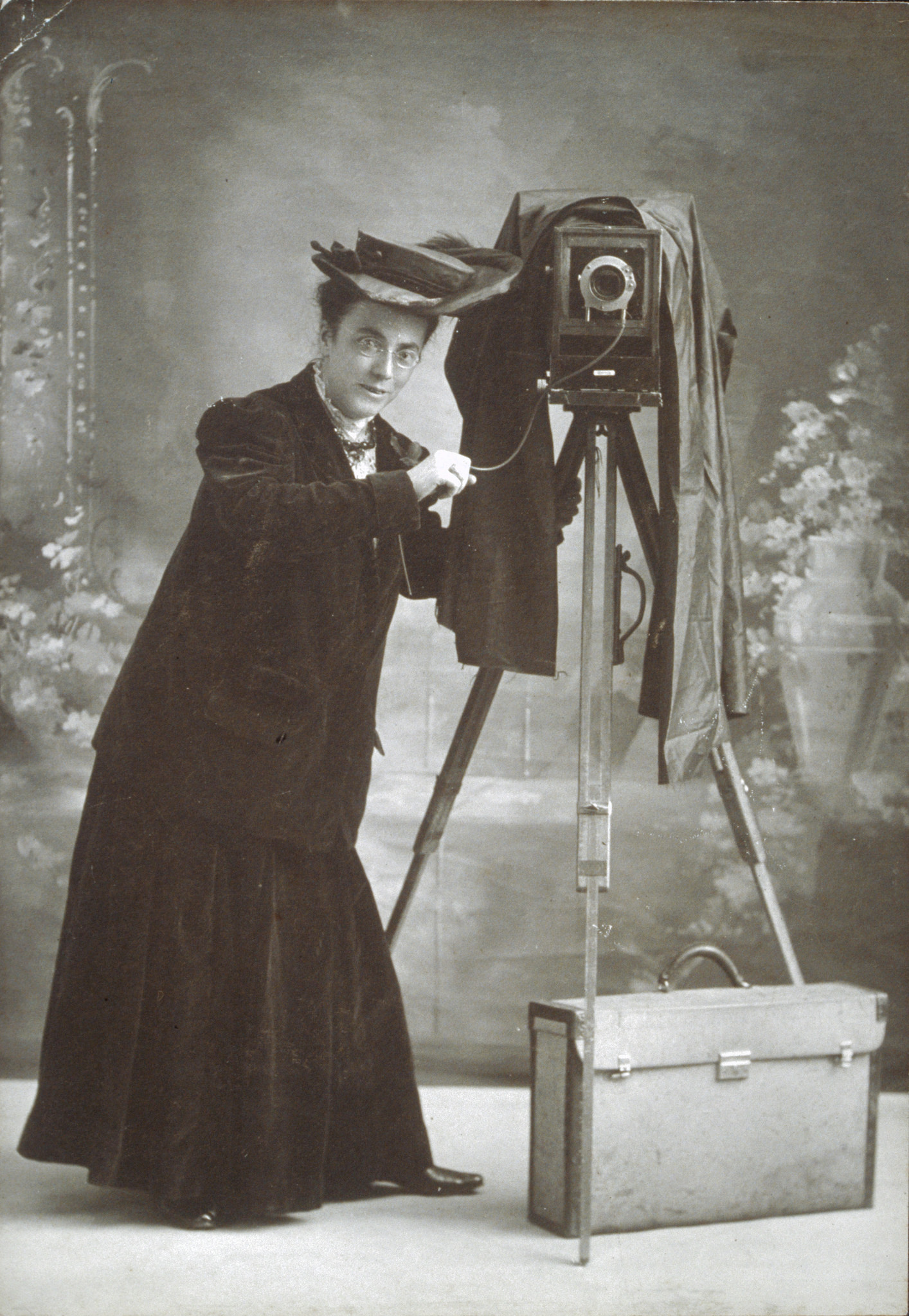
Photographer Jessie Tarbox Beals standing next to her camera

The library's holdings include manuscripts; books and periodicals; and photographic and audiovisual material.

While its focus for collecting is American women, the library has an abundance of print and manuscript materials bearing on issues around the globe as a result of American women's extensive travel and foreign residence. Some examples are letters of early missionaries in China, activists' accounts of the Women's Encampment for a Future of Peace and Justice, and the world-spanning speeches and writings of Shirley Graham Du Bois.

Detailed records for the library's manuscript collections as well as books and periodicals can be found in HOLLIS. The catalog record gives a description of the item or collection and provides other important information such as offsite location or access restrictions. Researchers can learn more about the manuscript collections by consulting the Schlesinger Library's Research Guides. Research Librarians can be reached through Ask a Schlesinger Librarian.

=== Manuscripts ===
There are more than 2,500 unique manuscript collections from individuals, families, and organizations. Women's rights movements past and present, feminism, health and sexuality, social reform, and the education of women and girls are core manuscript holdings. Ordinary lives of women and families and the struggles and triumphs of women of accomplishment are richly documented in diaries and other personal records. Many collections, such as the papers of Charlotte Perkins Gilman, Pauli Murray, and the records of the National Organization for Women, feature political, organizational, and economic questions. In 1972 the National Organization for Women chose the Schlesinger Library as the archives for its records; the collection has grown to be one of its largest (300 linear feet of manuscripts and growing as of 2013) and one of its most heavily used by researchers.

=== Books and periodicals ===
More than 80,000 printed volumes include scholarly monographs as well as popular works. These cover topics including women's rights; women and work; women's health; women of color; comparative material about women in other cultures; works on women in the arts and in music; women and family; feminist and anti-feminist theory; and lesbian writings. Hundreds of periodical titles, including popular magazines such as Ladies' Home Journal, Ebony, Seventeen, highlight domestic concerns, leisure pursuits, etiquette, fashion, and food.

The library has two distinguished special collections. The first is a culinary collection of over 15,000 books, spanning five centuries and global cuisines. This collection also includes the papers of several famous chefs and foodwriters such as M.F.K. Fisher, Julia Child, and Elizabeth David. The second is archives of Radcliffe College, 1879–1999 — including papers of college officers, students, and alumnae — which record the history of women in higher education.

=== Photographic and audiovisual material ===
More than 90,000 photographs, ranging from casual snapshots to the works of professional photographers, provide a visual record of private and public life. Audiotapes, videotapes and oral history tapes, and transcripts add the soundtrack to the story of women's lives.

The Schlesinger Library is home to the Black Women Oral History Project, recorded between 1976 and 1981. With support from the Schlesinger Library, the project recorded a cross section of women who had made significant contributions to American society during the first half of the 20th century.
