= Arthur M. Schlesinger Sr. =

American historian (1888–1965)

Arthur M. Schlesinger
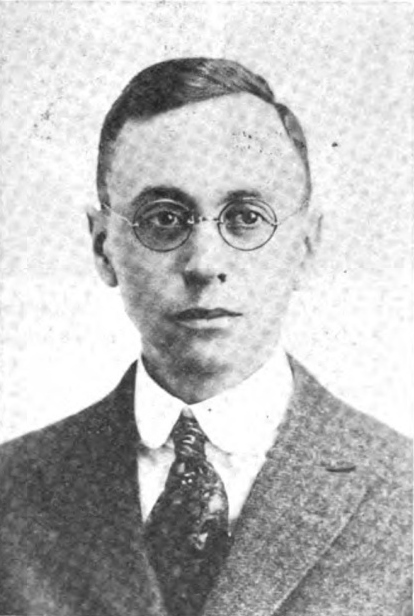
- Photograph of Schlesinger, 1919
- Born: Arthur Meier Schlesinger; February 27, 1888; Xenia, Ohio, U.S.
- Died: October 30, 1965 (aged 77); Boston, Massachusetts, U.S.
- Education: Ohio State University (BA); Columbia University (PhD)
- Occupation: Historian
- Children: Arthur Jr.

Arthur Meier Schlesinger (/ˈʃlɛsɪndʒər/ SHLESS-in-jər; February 27, 1888 – October 30, 1965) was an American historian who taught at Harvard University, pioneering social history and urban history. He was a Progressive Era intellectual who stressed material causes (such as economic profit and conflict between businessmen and farmers) and downplayed ideology and values as motivations for historical actors. He was highly influential as a director of PhD dissertations at Harvard for three decades, especially in the fields of social, women's, and immigration history. His son, Arthur M. Schlesinger Jr. (1917–2007), also taught at Harvard and was a noted historian.

== Life and career ==
Schlesinger's father, Bernhard Schlesinger, was a Prussian Jew, and his mother, Kate (née Feurle), was an Austrian Catholic. The two converted to Protestantism together and emigrated to Xenia, Ohio, in 1872.

He was born in Xenia, Ohio, and graduated from Ohio State University in 1910. While a student at Ohio State, he was initiated into the Ohio Zeta chapter of the Phi Delta Theta fraternity. He got his PhD in history at Columbia University, where he was influenced by both Herbert L. Osgood and Charles A. Beard. He taught at Ohio State and the University of Iowa before he joined the faculty of Harvard University as a professor of history in 1924, succeeded Frederick Jackson Turner and taught at Harvard until 1954. Harvard's Schlesinger Library in women's history is named after him and his wife, Elizabeth, a noted feminist. He became an editor of the New England Quarterly in 1928. That same year, he was elected to the American Academy of Arts and Sciences. He was elected to the American Philosophical Society in 1941.

In Boston in 1929, city officials, under the leadership of James Curley, threatened to arrest Margaret Sanger if she spoke on birth control. In response, she stood on stage, silent with a gag over her mouth, while her speech was read by Schlesinger.

He enjoyed strong family ties and commitment. His two sisters, Olga and Marion Etna, became schoolteachers and made it possible for their three younger brothers (George, Arthur, and Hugo) to attend college graduating in engineering, history and law. One of his sons was born Arthur Bancroft Schlesinger and replaced his middle name with "Meier", adding Jr., later in life.

Schlesinger died at Peter Bent Brigham Hospital in Boston, Massachusetts.

== Ideas ==
He pioneered social history and urban history. He was a Progressive Era intellectual who stressed material causes (like economic profit) and downplayed ideology and values as motivations for historical actors. He was highly influential as a director of PhD dissertations at Harvard for three decades, especially in the fields of social, women's, and immigration history. He commented in 1922, "From reading history in textbooks one would think half of our population made only a negligible contribution to history." He promoted social history by co-editing the 13-volume History of American Life (1928–1943) series with Dixon Ryan Fox. These thick volumes, written by leading young scholars, mostly avoid politics, individuals, and constitutional issues. They instead focus on such topics as society, demographics, economic, housing, fashion, sports, education, and cultural life.

In "Tides of American Politics", a provocative essay in the Yale Review in 1939, he presented his cyclical view of history which identified irregular oscillations between liberal and conservative national moods, but it attracted few historians apart from his son. Schlesinger introduced the idea of polling historians to rank presidential greatness, which attracted much attention.

In an essay on "The Significance of Jacksonian Democracy" (in New Viewpoints in American History (1922)), Schlesinger drew attention to the fact that "while democracy was working out its destiny in the forests of the Mississippi Valley, the men left behind in the eastern cities were engaging in a struggle to establish conditions of equality and social well-being adapted to their special circumstances."

As a historian of the rise of the city in American life, he argued that for a full understanding of the Jacksonian democratic movement: "It is necessary to consider the changed circumstances of life of the common man in the new industrial centers of the East since the opening years of the nineteenth century." That was a challenge to the frontier thesis of his Harvard colleague Frederick Jackson Turner. In Schlesinger's essay, the common man of the Mississippi Valley and the common man of eastern industrialism stood uneasily side by side. Schlesinger characterized prejudice against Catholics as "the deepest bias in the history of the American people".

Schlesinger and his students took a group approach to history, sharply downplaying the role of individuals. Groups were defined by ethnicity (Germans, Irish, Jews, Italians, Hispanics, etc.) or by class (working class, middle class). Their model was that the urban environment, including the interaction with other groups, shaped their history and group outlook in deterministic fashion.

== Works ==
- 1917 The Colonial Merchants and the American Revolution, 1763–1776 online
- 1919 "The American Revolution Reconsidered," Political Science Quarterly, Vol. 34, No. 1 (Mar., 1919), pp. 61-78

online

- 1922 New Viewpoints in American History, historiographical essays online
- 1925 Political and Social Growth of the American People, 1865–1940, with Homer C. Hockett; college textbook in numerous editions
- 1926 Political and Social History of the United States, 1829–1925; The Macmillan Company, New York
- 1930 "A Critical Period in American Religion, 1875–1900," Proceedings of the Massachusetts Historical Society 64 (1930–32) pp: 523–47.
- 1933 The Rise of the City, 1878–1898 online
- 1935 The Colonial Newspapers and the Stamp Act JSTOR 359430
- 1940. "The City in American History: Mississippi Valley Historical Review, Vol. 27, No. 1 (Jun., 1940), pp. 43–66 JSTOR 1896571, highly influential article
- 1941 "Patriotism Names the Baby," New England Quarterly, Vol. 14, No. 4 (Dec., 1941), pp. 611–618 JSTOR 360597
- 1944 "Biography of a Nation of Joiners," American Historical Review, Vol. 50, No. 1 (Oct., 1944), pp. 1–25 JSTOR 1843565
- 1946 Learning How to Behave: A Historical Study of American Etiquette Books
- 1949 Paths to the Present
- 1951 The rise of modern America, 1865-1951 online
- 1958 Prelude to Independence: The Newspaper War on Britain, 1764–1776 online
- 1950 The American As Reformer.
- 1954 "A Note on Songs as Patriot Propaganda 1765–1776," William and Mary Quarterly Vol. 11, No. 1 (Jan., 1954), pp. 78–88 JSTOR 1923150
- 1955 "Political Mobs and the American Revolution, 1765–1776," Proceedings of the American Philosophical Society' Vol. 99, No. 4 (Aug. 30, 1955), pp. 244–250 JSTOR 3143703
- 1963 In Retrospect: The History of a Historian, autobiography online
- 1968 Birth of the Nation: A Portrait of the American People on the Eve of Independence online

== See also ==
- Colonial America
- Social history
- James H. Robinson
