= List of Massachusetts suffragists =

This is a list of Massachusetts suffragists, suffrage groups and others associated with the cause of women's suffrage in Massachusetts.

== Groups ==
- American Woman Suffrage Association (AWSA).
- Boston Equal Suffrage Association for Good Government.
- College Equal Suffrage League.
- Congressional Union for Woman Suffrage.
- Massachusetts School Suffrage Association.
- Massachusetts Woman Suffrage Association.
- National American Woman Suffrage Association (NAWSA).
- Worcester Equal Franchise Club.
- Woman Suffrage Party of Massachusetts.

== Suffragists ==
- Jane Kelley Adams (1852–1924) — educator; chair of the Woburn, Massachusetts Equal Suffrage League.
- Sarah Louise Arnold (1859–1943) – Massachusetts suffragist; first dean of Simmons College; national president, Girl Scouts of the USA.
- Mary Alderson Chandler Atherton (1849–1934), educator, author, publisher; member of the Massachusetts Woman Suffrage Association.
- Clara Bancroft Beatley (1858–1923) – educator, lecturer, author; chair, Moral Education Department, Boston Equal Suffrage Association.
- Jennie Collins (1828–1887) – labor reformer, humanitarian, and suffragist.
- Martha E. Sewall Curtis (1858–1915) – president, Woburn (Massachusetts) Equal Suffrage League; State lecturer, Massachusetts Woman Suffrage Association.
- Sarah Stoddard Eddy (1831–1904) – social reformer, clubwoman.
- Margaret Foley (1875–1957) – working class suffragist, active in Massachusetts and campaigning in other states.
- Martha Seavey Hoyt (1844–1915) – biographer, newspaper correspondent, and businesswoman; member, Massachusetts Woman Suffrage Association.
- Rachel Harris Johnson (1887–1983)- member of the Worcester Equal Franchise Club.
- Mary Morton Kehew (1859–1918) – labor/social reformer and suffragist from Boston.
- Abby Kelley (1811–1887) – abolitionist, radical social reformer, fundraiser, lecturer and organizer for the American Anti-Slavery Society.
- Florence Luscomb (1887–1985) – architect and prominent leader of Massachusetts suffragists.
- Maud Wood Park (1871–1955) – founder of the College Equal Suffrage League, co-founder of the Boston Equal Suffrage Association for Good Government (BESAGG); worked for passage of the 19th Amendment.
- Mary Hutcheson Page (1860–1940) – Member of the Boston Equal Suffrage Association for Good Government, the National American Woman Suffrage Association, and the National Executive Committee of the Congressional Union for Women Suffrage. 1910 President of the National Woman Suffrage Association.
- Cora Scott Pond Pope (born 1856) – Massachusetts suffragist; teacher, pageant writer, real estate developer.
- Florida Ruffin Ridley (1861–1943) – African-American civil rights activist, suffragist, teacher, writer, and editor from Boston.
- Josephine St. Pierre Ruffin (1842–1924) – African-American publisher, journalist, civil rights leader, suffragist, and editor.
- Harriette Lucy Robinson Shattuck (1850–1937) – president of the National Woman Suffrage Association of Massachusetts.
- Pauline Agassiz Shaw (1841–1917) – co-founder and first president of the Boston Equal Suffrage Association for Good Government.
- Judith Winsor Smith (1821–1921) – president of the East Boston Woman Suffrage League.
- Anna E. Stoddard.
- Sarah E. Wall (1825–1907) – organizer of an anti-tax protest that defended a woman's right not to pay taxation without representation.
- Electa Nobles Lincoln Walton.
- Alice L. Thompson Waytes.

== Suffragists who campaigned in Massachusetts ==
- L. J. C. Daniels.
- Laura M. Johns.

== See also ==
- List of American suffragists

== See also ==
- Massachusetts in the woman suffrage movement. A general; political, legal and legislative history from 1774 to 1881., By Harriet H. Robinson... , (Boston, Roberts Brothers, 1881), via Hathitrust
