= Church of the Disciples =

Church of the Disciples may refer to:

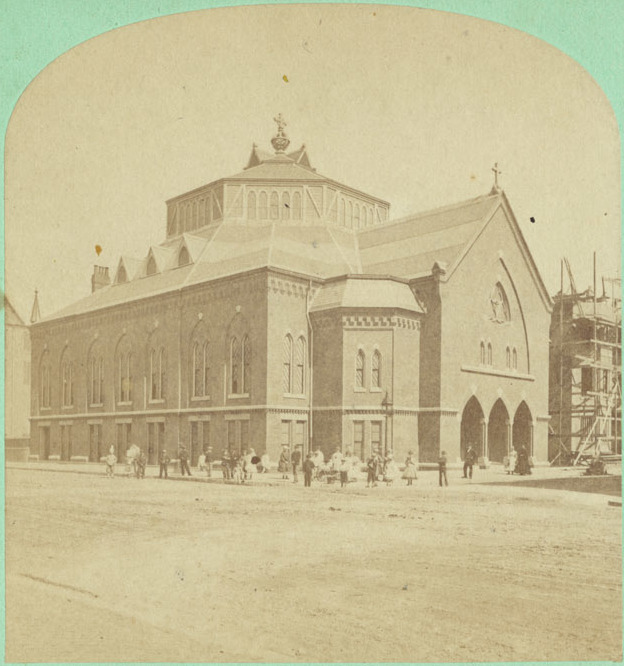
Church of the Disciples, Boston

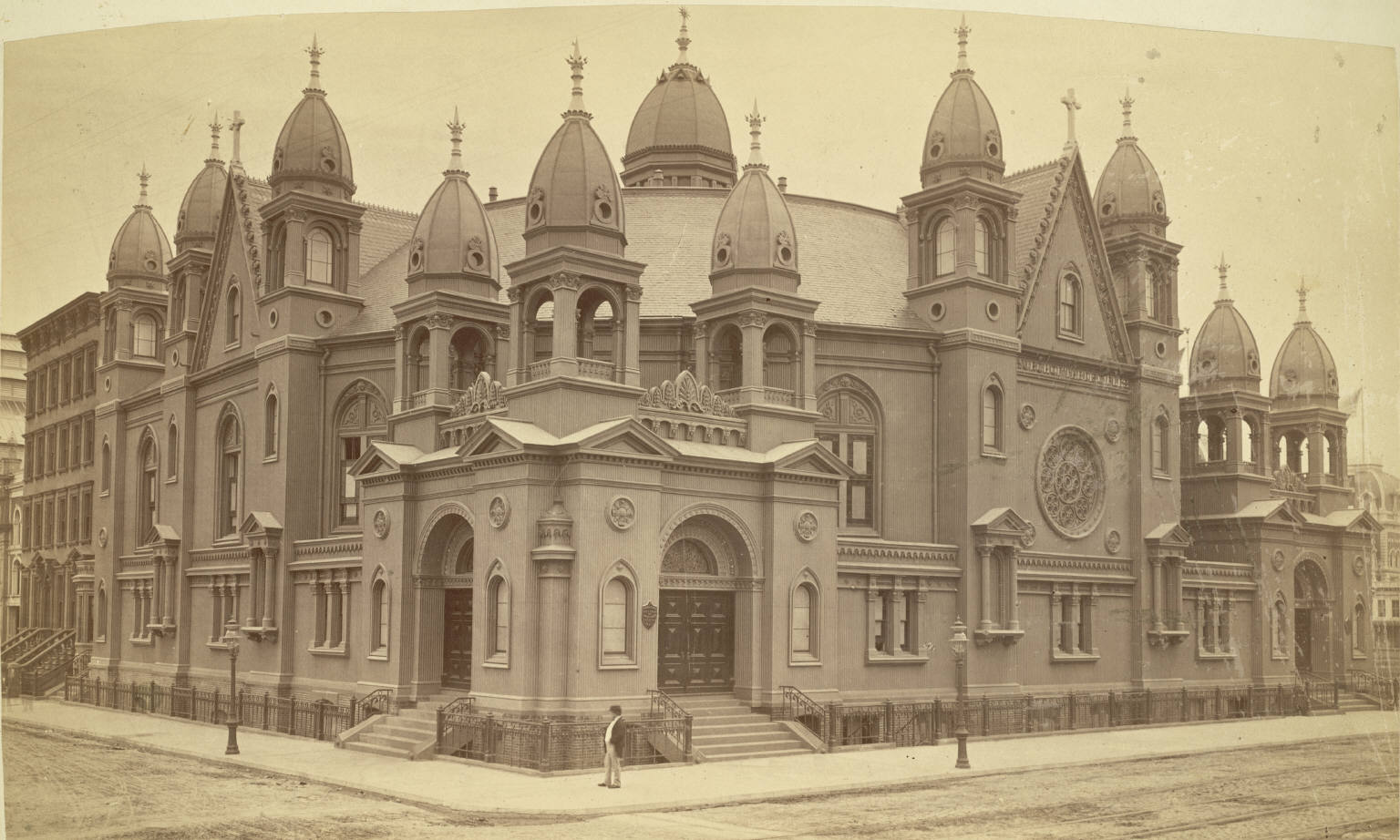
Church of the Disciples, New York City

- Christian Church (Disciples of Christ), a mainline Protestant (religious) denomination
- Church of the Disciples (Boston), later, united with Arlington Street Church
- Church of the Disciples (New York City), later, Madison Avenue Congregational Church
- Church of the Disciples (Remus, Michigan)

== See also ==
- Missionary Church of the Disciples of Jesus Christ. evangelical non-profit religious organization based in West Covina, California, US
