= Alice Ames Winter =

American writer and women's club leader (1865–1944)

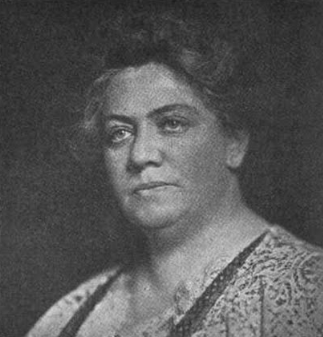
Alice Ames Winter, 1921

Alice Ames Winter (November 25, 1865 – April 5, 1944) was an American litterateur, author and clubwoman. She served as president of the General Federation of Women's Clubs (GFWC).

== Early years and education ==
Alice Vivian Ames was born in Albany, New York, November 25, 1865. Her parents were Rev. Charles Gordon and Fanny Baker Ames, philanthropist and women's rights activist. She had three siblings, including a sister, Edith Theodora Ames; a brother, Theodore, who died in infancy; and a half brother, Charles Wilberforce Ames. Her ancestors included Francis and John Cooke, and Richard Warren who arrived in the United States in 1620 on the Mayflower.

Winter was a student at the Pennsylvania Academy Fine Arts. She graduated from Wellesley College in 1886 with a B.A. degree, and in 1889 with an M.A. degree.

== Career ==
During the period of 1890 to 1892, Winter worked as a teacher, and in the 1890s, she served as president of the Minneapolis Kindergarten Association. She was one of the founders and was the first president (1907–15) of the Woman's Club of Minneapolis.

During World War I, she was chairman of the Council of National Defense Minnesota Woman's Committee and the Minnesota Commission of Public Safety Women's Auxiliary. She also served as director of the Minnesota Child Labor Commission, and of the Minneapolis chapter of the American Red Cross. Winters used the connections that she made on these committees to further the cause of woman suffrage.

After the war, she continued her organizational activities as vice-president (1918–20) and president (1920-24) of the GFWC. In 1920, she was affiliated with the establishment of the Women's Joint Congressional Committee. In 1928, she served as director of the Home Women's Bureau and the Republican National Committee. Winter was a member of Clio, the Minnesota Playground Association, League of American Pen Women, New Century, Shakespeare Club, and the Woman's Friday Morning Club.

Her works included Prize to the Hardy, Bobbs-Merrill, 1905; Jewell Weed, 1907; and Charles Ames, a Biography, Houghton. Mifflin, 1913.

== Personal life ==
On June 25, 1892, she married Thomas Gerald Winter, of Minneapolis, Minnesota. They had a son, Charles Gilbert, and a daughter, Edith Winter Ames. In religion, Winter was a Unitarian.

She died April 5, 1944. Her papers are held at the Hoover Institution.

== Selected works ==
- How shall we judge a motion picture?, 19??
- The Prize to the Hardy. With drawings by R.M. Crosby. (A novel), 1905
- Jewel Weed. With illustrations by Harrison Fisher, 1906
- Women's Clubs To-day, 1921
- To American women : a plea, 1922
- The business of being a club woman, 1925
- The little woman who made a great war, 1927
- The Heritage of Women, 1928
- What do we want of a president?., 1928
- Hopeful tides in American politics, 1928
- A woman's reason in politics, 1928
- Better pictures in your home town : suggestions to local better films committees, 1932
- Motion picture study program : in four numbers, 1936
