= Church of the Disciples (Boston) =

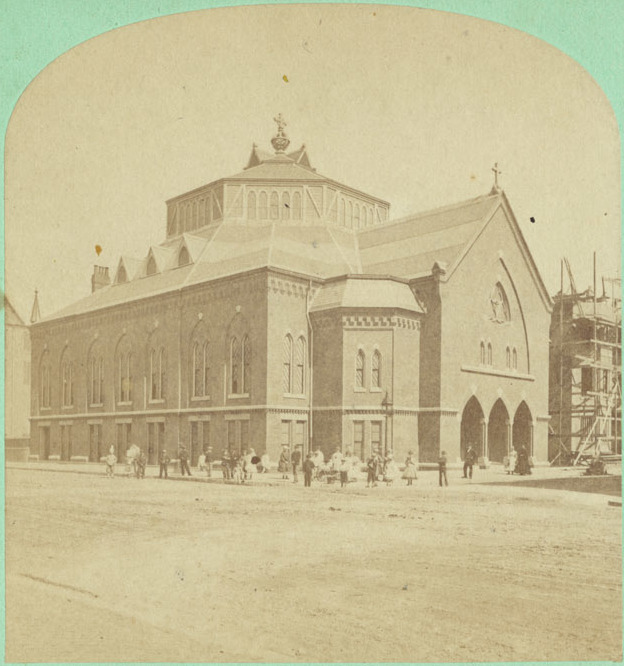
- Church of the Disciples, corner of West Brookline Street and Warren Avenue (ca. 1860-1870)
- Church of the Disciples
- 42.3436°N 71.0764°W
- Location: Boston, Massachusetts
- Country: U.S.
- Denomination: American Unitarian Association

History
- Status: united with Arlington Street Church, 1941
- Founded: 1841
- Founder: James Freeman Clarke

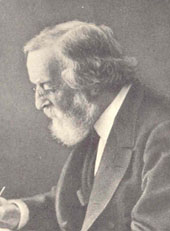
James Freeman Clarke

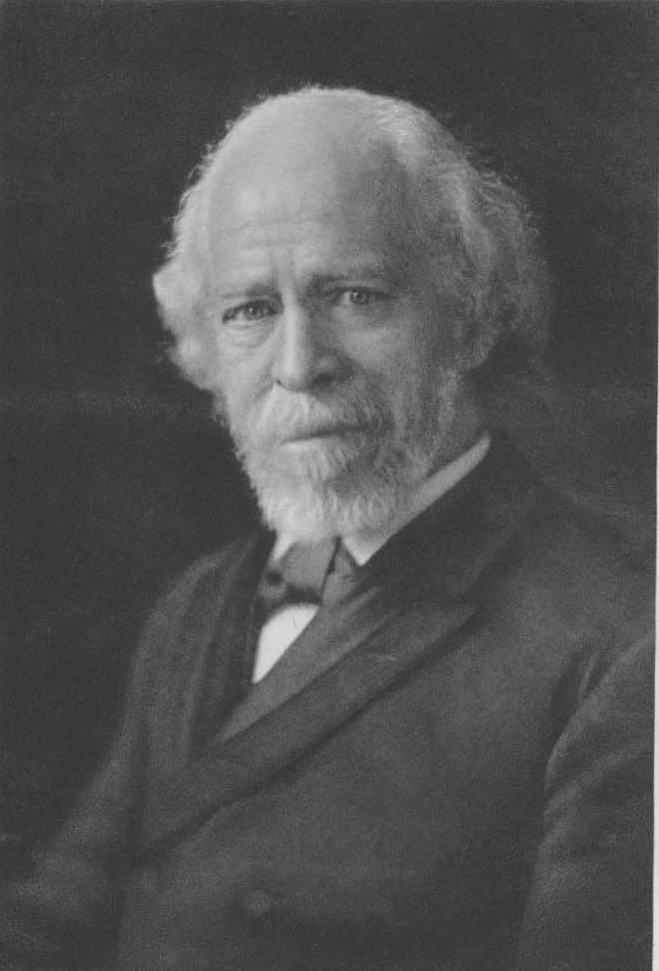
Charles Gordon Ames

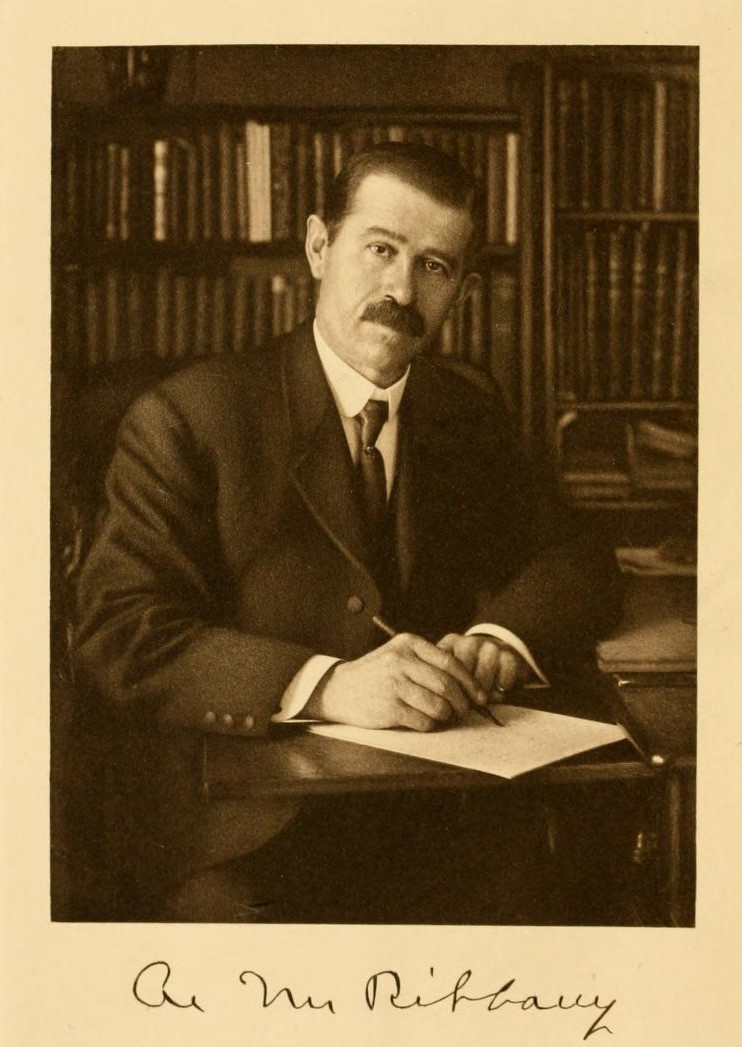
Abraham Mitrie Rihbany

Church of the Disciples was a Unitarian church located in Boston, Massachusetts. It was founded by James Freeman Clarke early in 1841. The first public step taken by Clarke was preaching three times in the Phillips Place Chapel, with the purpose of forming a new religious society. The first meeting subsequent to organization was in a part of Amory Hall. The congregation soon outgrew the room and for a while, they met at Ritchie Hall. When they were able to secure the whole of Amory Hall, they returned to it. When it became too small for their increasing numbers, they went to the Masonic Temple. Though an internal split occurred in 1845, the congregation was ready to build its own structure in 1847, the Freeman Place Chapel.

Clarke's health faded in 1849, and for the next five years, most of the congregants scattered, while a few remained together, meeting monthly. Clarke returned to his duties in 1854, and in the following year, the church came into possession of the Indiana-Place Chapel. The need of a larger place of worship brought a removal in 1868 to the church at the corner of West Brookline Street and Warren Avenue.

Clarke died in 1888, and in the following year, Charles Gordon Ames became the new minister. The congregation moved to the Jersey and Peterboro Streets Church in 1905. Ames was succeeded by his associate minister, Rev. Abraham Mitrie Rihbany, in 1910 who retired in 1938. In 1941, the Church of the Disciples sold its edifice and united with the Arlington Street Church.

== Background ==
The period immediately following the financial crisis of 1837, when the fortunes of very many in the community were swept away, was one of intense religious excitement, and revivals in the churches that claimed to be evangelical. The liberal denominations were alike awakened; but they were disappointed to find that, while there was increased religious interest as well as activity, they failed to bring into their churches any considerable number of earnest Christian worshippers.

There had for several years existed in Boston an association of Unitarian clergy and laymen, who met from time to time at one another's houses to consult upon the general interests of their denomination; and in the winter of 1840-41 these meetings were very fully attended. There was a general desire to bring into their congregations that numerous class who were unable to have pews of their own, and whose sense of independence or of pride kept them from occupying the free seats of which there was an abundance in some of the churches. These were generally empty, unless, occasionally, strangers might be seen in them. The pews were, for the most part, occupied by those who owned or hired them; and, however small might be their families, it was not customary to let other people sit in them.

Moreover, a strong desire existed at this time for a higher degree of spiritual culture than could be obtained from the customary religious services of their congregations. There seemed to be a need in the Unitarian community for a church of a different character and organization from those already existing. Various measures for meeting this want were discussed. It was agreed that the new church must be a free church, - that is, one supported by the voluntary contributions of its members; but the establishment of such a church seemed to many to be beset with too great obstacles to be successful. No one presented himself to take on the task, until James Freeman Clarke, at one of these meetings offered to undertake the work on his own responsibility.

Clarke had given this considerable advance thought. In March 1836, he wrote from Louisville, Kentucky:— "I sometimes think that, could I go to Boston and preach in some free church, or start a new society on rather different principles, speaking more to conscience than to intellect, more to intuitive reason than to speculative understanding, making morality and religion one, not two separate matters, I might find a number who would hear me gladly.” Again, in May 1840, he wrote from Louisville: "I have made up my mind to one thing conclusively; that is, not to commit myself hastily to any new situation or work. What I next undertake I wish to continue through life. ... " In October 1840, he wrote from New England: "There are many large parishes vacant where I might settle, and it would be pleasant enough to have leisure for study; but I think I could do more in a city, and am better suited for that life. ... What I should like best would be a church founded on elective affinities, not on the purse principle. I mean a society drawn together because they like me and my ideas."

== Formation ==
In making this announcement to undertake the work, Clarke acted with the encouragement of Dr. William Ellery Channing, and of one of the most experienced members of the Boston Association. He did not consult with the Association as a body, nor with many of them as individuals.

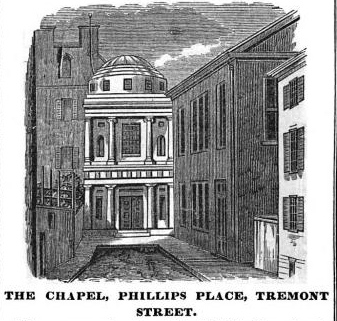
Phillips Place Chapel on Tremont Street

The first public step was taken by Clarke, by preaching three times in the Phillips Place Chapel, having advertised before in the Christian Register that these sermons would be preached with the purpose of forming a new religious society. He preached on the following subjects: "What shall I do to be saved?" (January 31, 1841), "Justification by Faith" (February 7, 1841), and "The Church; as it was, as it ought to be, as it may be." (February 13, 1841).

In consequence of a notice given in Phillips Place Chapel, a meeting of the friends of the movement was held at a private house, February 17, 1841. Clarke read a series of proposals:—

"I offer to go on and preach, every Lord's day, in the morning and evening, for three or six months, or until the society becomes strong enough to contribute to the support of a preacher, upon the following conditions.
First, that without any longer delay than may be necessary, a hall be provided in some convenient part of the city, with fire, lights, &c.
Second, that when the time shall arrive to organize a church, it shall be understood that the following three principles be embodied in it.
The Social Principle. There shall be regular social religious meetings, for conversation, worship, and benevolent action
The Voluntary Principle. While we worship in a hall, or whenever we shall remove to a church, the expenses shall be defrayed by a voluntary subscription, and pews shall not be sold, rented or taxed.
Congregational Worship. So far as may be practicable we will endeavor that the whole congregation shall join in the worship of God, by responses to the prayers, and by uniting in the hymns, chants and anthems."

These measures were adopted for forming a society, to bear the name of "The Church of the Disciples", intending thereby to signify that the group were simply a band of scholars or disciples. A hall was procured, and the first service held on February 28, 1841. The form of public worship first adopted by the Church was as follows: Singing, by the whole congregation; Reading from the Psalms of David; The Lord's Prayer; Reading selections from the Scriptures; Singing; The Sermon; A pause for silent prayer; An extempore prayer; Singing; and Benediction.

== Early history ==
The first social meeting was held on March 16, 1841, to consider and determine on the form of worship. At this meeting Channing, Samuel Joseph May and George Ripley were present, and joined in the conversation. On April 13, a declaration of faith was adopted. The church was organized at an adjourned meeting on April 27, by 48 persons signing this declaration of Faith, it having been unanimously adopted at a previous meeting.

At the time that this church was thus collected, there was a dissatisfaction existing among the various churches in the city, and a desire prevailed for something new. It was difficult to say what was wanted. The dissatisfied persons did not perhaps clearly see themselves what they needed, but the want was no less real on that account. As far as could be collected, the substance of the desire was as follows. Some said that there was not enough of religious life in the churches; that there was too much of mere routine and form; and they wanted more activity, more zeal, more church action. Some thought that a more orthodox tone of preaching and doctrine were needed. Some wanted more freedom of thought and of action. Some wished for more interesting modes of worship, and such as would allow the congregation to take part in them.

When the church was established, most of these malcontents came into it. It was predicted in consequence, that it would soon fall apart; it was said that the members were restless people, who would be always dissatisfied; that nothing could suit them long. It was said that the church should be made up of Abolitionists and Transcendentalists, and all kinds of Reformers, mixed with Rationalists and Spiritualists, and Orthodox. It was thought that such heterogeneous materials could not hold together long. Indeed, there seemed to be some danger, for as the founders constantly met for the discussion and investigation of Christian truth, they recognized a great variety of opinion, and opposing tendencies in their midst. They evidently had antagonist elements among themselves. Some were lovers of freedom, and liberal Christianity (so-called) was not liberal enough for them. Others were half orthodox in their belief, and quite orthodox in many of their most cherished convictions.

The first meeting was in a part of Amory Hall, which was then occupied as a small theatre during the week. The congregation soon outgrew the room they were occupying, and hired for a while Ritchie Hall in the same block, until they were able to secure the whole of Amory Hall. Afterward, they found this too small for their increasing numbers, and they went to the Masonic Temple, which would seat 750 persons.

== Separation (1845) ==
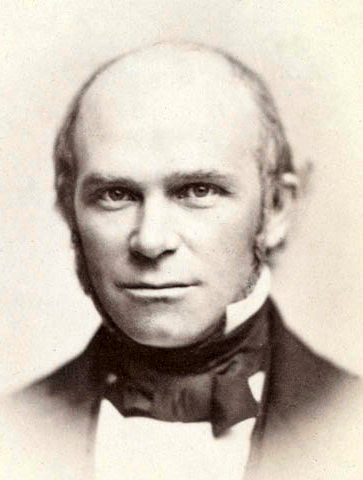
Theodore Parker

In February, 1845, between 15 and 20 members of the Church seceded from it, in consequence of an exchange between Clarke and Rev. Theodore Parker, then a member of the Boston Association. The seceders, with others, formed a new Church, under the name of the Church of the Saviour, between which and the Church of the Disciples cordial and friendly relations existed.

== Freeman Place Chapel construction (1847) ==
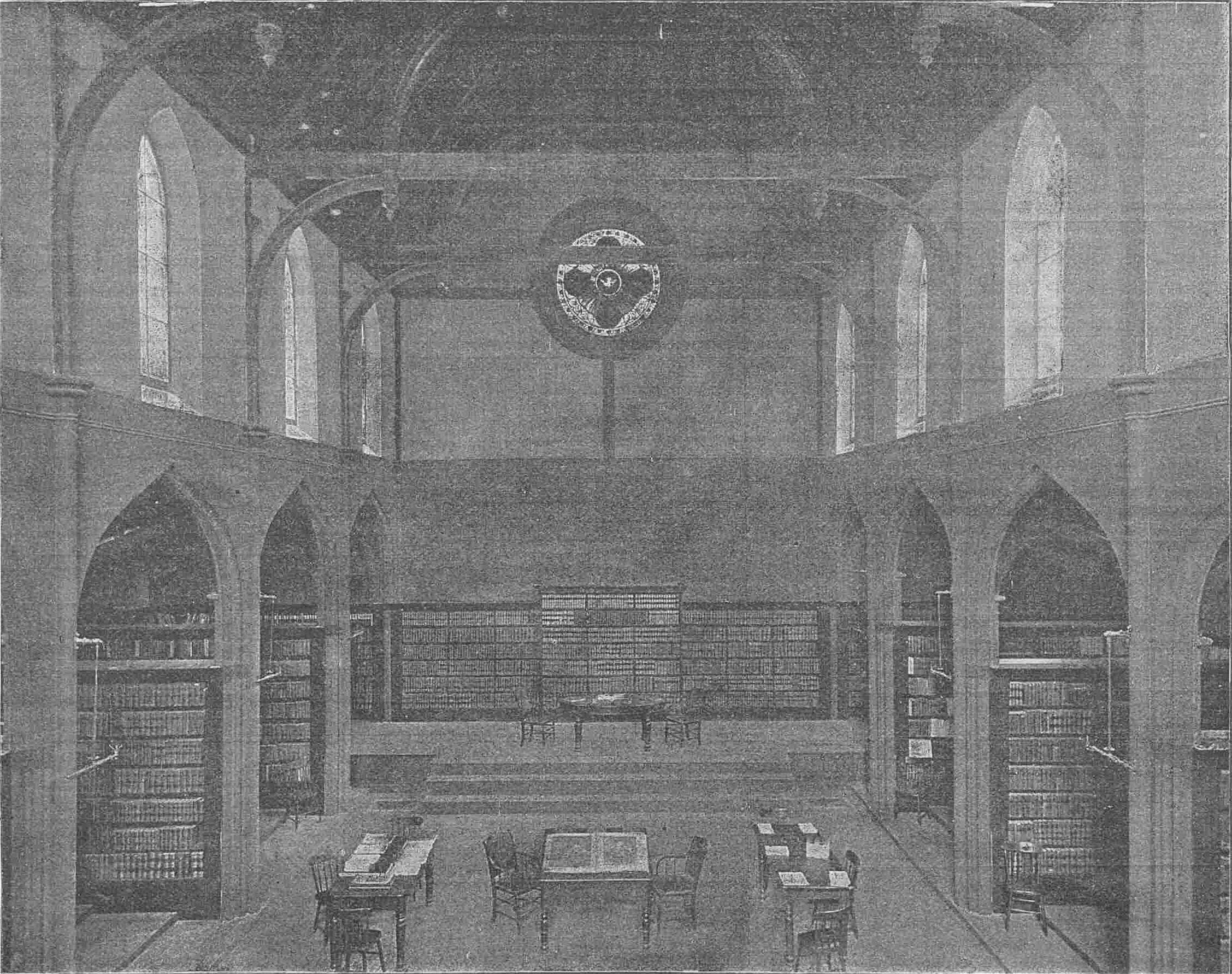
Freeman Place Chapel after it became Soule's bookshop (1887)

The time arrived when the congregation thought it was strong enough to have a building of its own. In 1847, a member of the Church offered to give US$5,000 toward the erection of a chapel. About US$6,000 more being subscribed by other members of the Church, a Building Committee was appointed, and the chapel was dedicated March 15, 1848. The architect was Edward Clarke Cabot. The chapel seated about 700 persons, without a gallery. It had a tasteful interior, with open roof, one large south window, and windows in the clerestory. The seats were partly circular, and those in the aisles were turned toward the nave. It was built at a cost of about US$30,000, nearly two-thirds of that amount having been contributed by members of the society and its friends, some of whom consented to furnish the remainder of the sum needed upon a mortgage of the estate.

== Scattering (1849-54) ==
But in 1849, Clarke notified the congregation that the state of his health was such that he would be forced to discontinue his pastoral services for at least a year. It was decided that it would be best to sell the Freeman Place Chapel and reorganize the church when Clarke's health was re-established. The sale was successful, and several years afterward, it enabled the church to secure the Indiana-Place Chapel building.

Clarke spent time in Europe beginning in July 1849, and again in 1852, returning in June 1853. During this interval, the society was scattered. Many united with other churches while a small band of the disciples kept together and met monthly in a hall, the use of which was given them by the Boston Young Men's Christian Union. A correspondence was interchanged between Clarke and his parishioners during his absence, so that when he was able, in January 1854, to resume his work, they soon gathered around this nucleus of an organization which had all the while been kept up; and the Church of the Disciples, which had never gone out of existence, assembled once more, first in the Christian Union hall for a short period and afterwards, in the Williams Hall, at the corner of Dover and Washington Streets.

== Clarke's later years (1855-88) ==
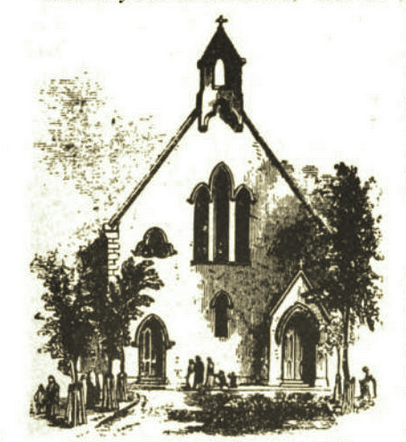
Indiana-Place Chapel (1855-68)

In 1855, the church came into possession of Indiana-Place Chapel, uniting with the society gathered there seven years before by the Rev. Thomas B. Fox. The 13 years in Indiana Place included the trying days of the civil war. Sermons were preached that called all to stand by one another. The congregants included Governor John Albion Andrew and Julia Ward Howe.

For many years, the Indiana Place Chapel held weekly evening meetings, in which the attendees discussed questions of religion and morality, church dogmas, Scripture texts, and the various reform movements in the community. It was not a debating society. It was a simple interchange of opinions in which the problems of life and duty were weighed and considered. Under Clarke's guidance and encouragement, the timid were drawn forth, and contributed their share in the conversation.

The Suffolk Conference of Unitarian and Other Christian Churches was formed in December 1866, in accordance with the recommendation of the National Conference of Unitarian and Other Christian Churches held in Syracuse, New York the preceding October. It included 19 churches -Church of the Disciples being one of them- which were represented in the Conference by their respective ministers and six lay delegates. Excellent people in the separate churches were brought together through the influence of the Conference, but the churches themselves resisted all attempts tried to mass and attach them.

== West Brookline Street Church (1868-1905) ==
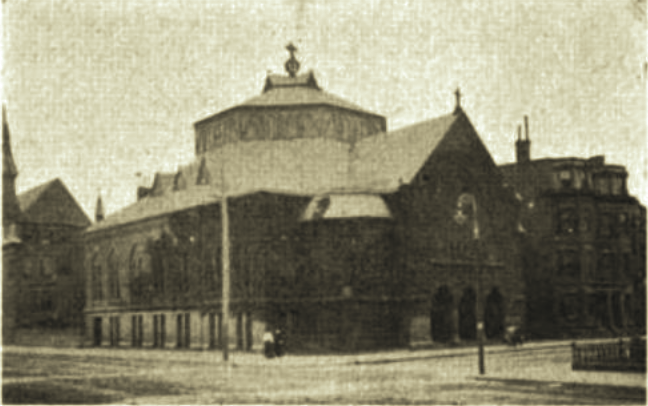
West Brookline Street Church (1868-1905)

The need of a larger house of worship brought a removal in 1868 to a new commodious church at the corner of West Brookline Street and Warren Avenue. It was a simple auditorium with no impressive architecture nor memorial windows. Clarke called this church the home of his soul. Here, he preached the remaining 19 years of his life, until his death in 1888.

In 1889, Charles Gordon Ames became the new minister. Ames ministered to the congregation for 23 years. Clara Bancroft Beatley undertook the charge of the church's Sunday school in September 1893, and continued in charge for 15 years.

== 20th-century ==
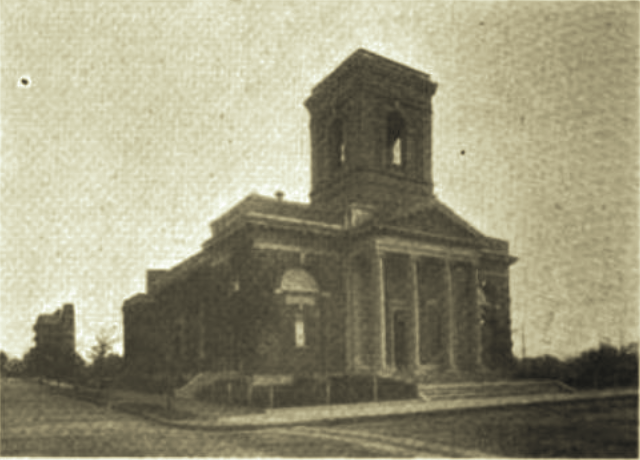
Jersey and Peterboro Streets Church (1905-41)

In 1905, Ames moved the church to a new house of worship at the corner of Jersey and Peterboro Streets, in the Back Bay. (Note: Fenway Park was built in 1912, about 850 feet (260 m) away from the church's Jersey and Peterboro Streets location.) Here he preached for five years. In 1910, Ames was succeeded by his associate minister, Rev. Abraham M. Rihbany. Under Rihbany, the church continued its social service. The Disciples Branch Alliance, that had for its early leaders, Abby W. May, Lucia M. Peabody, and Lilian Freeman Clarke, with Mrs. Ames (Fanny Baker Ames) as its president for 25 years, was a force of commanding leadership in the lives of its members. The Sunday school, that had inspired the leadership of John Albion Andrew and William Henry Baldwin Jr., took on new responsibilities in the field of religious education.

The church being free from debt for many years, it decided to secure a larger work by raising as a memorial to its second minister, "the Charles Gordon Ames Endowment Fund". The West Brookline church building was a memorial to the founder of the church, James Freeman Clarke. The organ was a memorial to Mrs. Clarke (Anna Huidekoper Clarke), a strong personality through the 50 years of her membership.

On April 21, 1912, the young people of the Disciples' Guild, and others made a pilgrimage to the places associated with the history of the church since its founding in 1841. First, they visited the old home of Lucia M. Peabody on Bowdoin Street, in whose parlor was held one of the initial meetings of the society. Freeman Place Chapel was found at the head of Freeman Place, and here the assembled group recited the covenant upon which the church was founded. The sites of Masonic and Amory Halls were found, and of Indiana Place Chapel. Then came the walk to the church on West Brookline Street. The final destination, the new church in Fenway, was reached by seven o'clock.

In the same year, Rihbany clarified the governing structure of the congregation in The Unitarian:—

"There is in the city of Boston at least one Unitarian Congregational church whose polity is strictly congregational. The Church of the Disciples, during the 72 years of its existence, has not deviated a hair's breadth from the true congregational principle on which it was founded by James Freeman Clarke and his first followers. In the first place, none of its pews have ever been sold or rented. They are all open and free to all those who seek to worship within its walls, whether they are members of years' standing or transient attendants. Its government is strictly congregational. Each adult member of its constituence is a 'proprietor' and a voter. At its annual business meeting, the privilege of speaking and voting is extended to 'all habitual attendants at its meetings of worship'. Its various activities are directed by committees which are elected by the congregation at the annual meetings, and which are responsible directly to the congregation. Its financial support is obtained from voluntary contributions, and no distinction is made between the person who contributes one dollar annually and the one who contributes five hundred dollars.

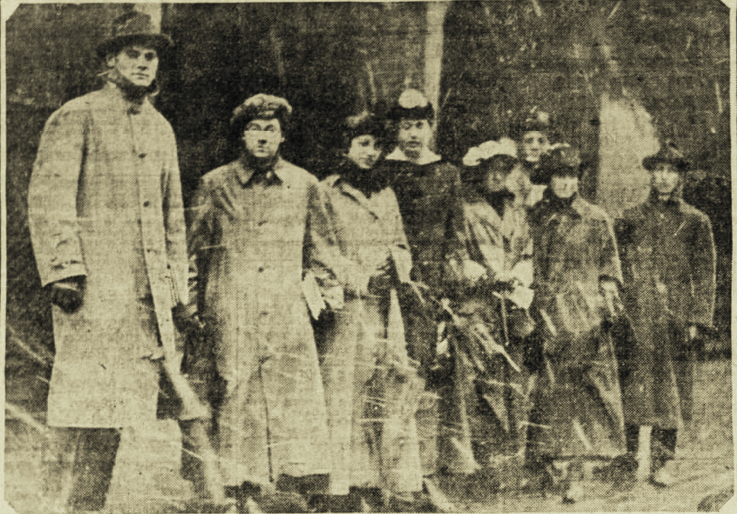
Pilgrimage walk by the Young People's Guild (1916)

On April 9, 1916, a five-day observance of the church's 75th anniversary began when the church's Young People's Guild made a pilgrimage of approximately 2 miles (3.2 km) on foot to visit the various earlier sites of their church. They visited: House 52 Bowdoin Street, home of Lucia M. Peabody; the Hub theatre, corner of Washington Street and Dover Street, which was known as Williams Hall when the society worshipped there; the north corner of Tremont Street and Temple Place, site of the earliest Boston Masonic Temple, in which was a public hall; the block on Washington Street, between Temple Place and West Street, the site of old Amory Hall, demolished about 15 years earlier; the site of the once popular Phillips Place chapel, off Tremont Street, opposite King's Chapel; Freeman Place Chapel, rear of Hotel Bellevue, the first edifice built for the Church of the Disciples, the edifice thereafter being utilized as a storehouse by a book concern; Morgan Memorial, corner of Shawmut Avenue and Indiana Place, site of Clarke's second regular church edifice; The Presbyterian Church, corner of West Brookline Street and Warren Avenue, built for the Church of the Disciples, and from which the society removed about ten years earlier to its location on Peterboro Street.

Rihbany retired in 1938, taking the title, minister emeritus. On April 20, 1941, a farewell service was held at the church, its edifice having been sold and the parish having united with the Arlington Street Church.

== Notable people ==
- Charles Gordon Ames, second minister
- Fanny Baker Ames, president, Disciples Branch Alliance
- Clara Bancroft Beatley, Sunday school superintendent
- Edward Clarke Cabot, architect, the church's Freeman Place Chapel
- James Freeman Clarke, founder; first minister
- Abraham Mitrie Rihbany, third minister
- Early members of the church:

- John Albion Andrew, early member
- William Henry Baldwin Jr., early member
- Sophia Hawthorne (Mary Peabody Mann's sister)
- Mary Tileston Hemenway , early member
- Julia Ward Howe, early member
- Mary Peabody Mann (Mrs. Horace Mann)
