= DJC =

DJC may refer to:

- Daily Journal of Commerce, a newspaper published in Portland, Oregon, United States
- Dutch Jewish council, a council that was active during the German occupation of the Netherlands in World War II
- Missionary Church of the Disciples of Jesus Christ, a mendicant evangelical sect based in California's Inland Empire
