= Abigail May =

Abigail May may refer to:

- Abigail (Abba) May Alcott (1800–1877), née May, suffragist and abolitionist, mother of Louisa May Alcott
- Abigail Williams May (1829–1888), political and social activist, first cousin of Louisa May Alcott
