= Abby May =

Abby May may refer to either of two nineteenth-century American feminists.

- Abigail (Abba) Alcott (née May) (1800–1877): suffragist and abolitionist, mother of Louisa May Alcott
- Abigail (Abby) Williams May (1829–1888): political and social activist, first cousin of Louisa May Alcott

== See also ==
- Abbe May (born 1983), Australian singer-songwriter, musician and human rights campaigner
- Abby-Mae Parkinson (born 1997), English racing cyclist
- Abby May Erceg (born 1989), New Zealand footballer
