= Fanny Baker Ames =

American philanthropist and women's-rights activist

- Born: June 14, 1840; Canandaigua, New York
- Died: August 21, 1931 (aged 91); Barnstable, Massachusetts
- Occupations: Philanthropist, Teacher, Factory Inspector

Fanny Baker Ames (14 June 1840 – 21 August 1931) was an American philanthropist and women's rights activist.

== Early life and education ==
Julia Frances Baker was born in Canandaigua, New York, 14 June 1840. Her parents were Increase Baker and Julia Canfield.

Ames attended Antioch College in 1857 for one term.

== Career ==
She taught school in Cincinnati until 1861, at which point she became a volunteer nurse in the Civil War. Ames married Reverend Charles Gordon Ames, the Unitarian activist, on June 25, 1863. Together, they attended the founding of the American Woman Suffrage Association in 1869, which influenced them to found the first suffrage society of California, their state of residence at the time. The two withdrew their support for the society when it aligned with the National Woman Suffrage Association, due to the rivalry between the National Women Suffrage Association and the American Woman Suffrage Association.

=== Work in Philadelphia ===
In 1872, the Ames Family moved to Philadelphia, where they would reside until 1877, and again from 1880 to 1888. In the wake of the Panic of 1873 she founded the Germantown Relief Society, an organization that responded to the financial crisis through charity work. Though the Ames Family moved to Boston, both Ames and her husband continued to spend much time in Philadelphia and continued much of their philanthropic and social work in the city.

She also helped found, and was head of, the New Century Club, one of the first women’s clubs and one of the most influential cultural and political clubs for feminists and reformers in the late 19th century. Ames would serve as the president of the New Century Club during 1887 and 1888.

In 1878, Ames founded the Philadelphia Society for Organizing Charity.

==== Children's Aid Society and Bureau of Information ====
In 1880, Ames founded the Children’s Aid Society and Bureau of Information, an organization that worked for the removal of children from almshouses and their relocation to homes, especially those in the country, which she believed could reduce poverty and juvenile delinquency rates. In 1883 Ames headed the first board of directors of the organization. In 1891, Ames presented a speech to the National Council of Women in Washington, D.C. titled “Care of Dependent Children” in which she called attention to women’s contributions to the improvement of the system by which orphaned children were looked after and moved to encourage women to continue their work in removing children from almshouses. She stated in the speech;

As the women of each household must chiefly care for the children of the household, so must the women of America care for the children of America; the women of each local community care for the children of that community; and especially for such children as who otherwise be unmothered and thrown upon that human agency which is least motherly, least considerate for such a function – the civil law or the public authority.

— Fanny Baker Ames, Care of Dependent Children

Though Ames did not live in Philadelphia for the majority of the time that she participated in the organization, she was able to contribute due to her constant travels to the city.

=== Work in Boston ===
In 1877, Charles Ames became the editor of the Christian Register, and the Ames family moved to Boston, where they resided until 1880, and then again permanently beginning in 1888.

Ames became the founder of the Women’s Auxiliary Conference of the Unitarian Church in 1880 and served as Vice President of the organization. Ames was a supporter of temperance and believed in the practice of teaching temperance principles in churches and schools.

The Ames Family moved permanently to Boston in 1888 when Charles G. Ames became the head of the Church of Disciples.

On May 9, 1891 Governor Russell of Massachusetts appointed Fanny Baker Ames and Mary Ellen Halley as state police inspectors for the Massachusetts District Police. They would become the first state policewomen to serve in Massachusetts and the United States. Her role was to oversee the status of women and children within factories. As an inspector she focused largely on the morality of the women, being very conservative in her approaches. One of her largest points of advocacy was to separate the spaces where the men and women worked because “any mixing of the sexes would lead to immorality” and she wanted to "guard them from immodest contact with men". She spoke with much emotion about this subject, begging the factory owners to imagine themselves as the father of the women in the factory. However, there was much criticizing from the lower class workers in the communities. People claimed that she was conservative to an extreme- too stuck in her ways. While she was praised for trying to protect white factory women, people raged that she showed no concern for the safety of the “half-savage”, or immigrant, female mill hands, as she referred to them. She retained this position until 1897.

== Later life ==
In 1899, she was selected to be one of the original members of the board of trustees of Simmons College. By the 1890s she was a prominent member of the Anti-Imperialist League.

In 1895, Ames was a member of the Committee on Divorce Reform of the National Council of Women and appeared before the National Divorce Reform League and presented a successful reform to allow women to appear on the board of the National Divorce Reform League.

She and her husband, along with many other individuals, were known to have spoken at a petitions and hearings for Municipal suffrage for female taxpayers at the State House of the Massachusetts Legislature between 1900 and 1910. Ames co-founded the Boston Equal Suffrage Association for Good Government in 1901 and she was the chairman of the Executive Committee. Ames presided over a meeting held by the Boston Equal Suffrage Association on March 23, 1907, to appreciate professional women as leaders of the Women’s suffrage movement. This meeting included representatives from every Massachusetts women’s college.

Ames died in Barnstable, Massachusetts, 21 August 1931, of a heart ailment and nephritis. She was survived by her two daughters, Edith Theodora Ames and Alice Vivian Ames Winter, the later went on to become a writer and the president of the General Federation of Women's Clubs. Ames is buried in Lakewood Cemetery, Minneapolis, Minnesota.
