= Abraham Mitrie Rihbany =

American historian

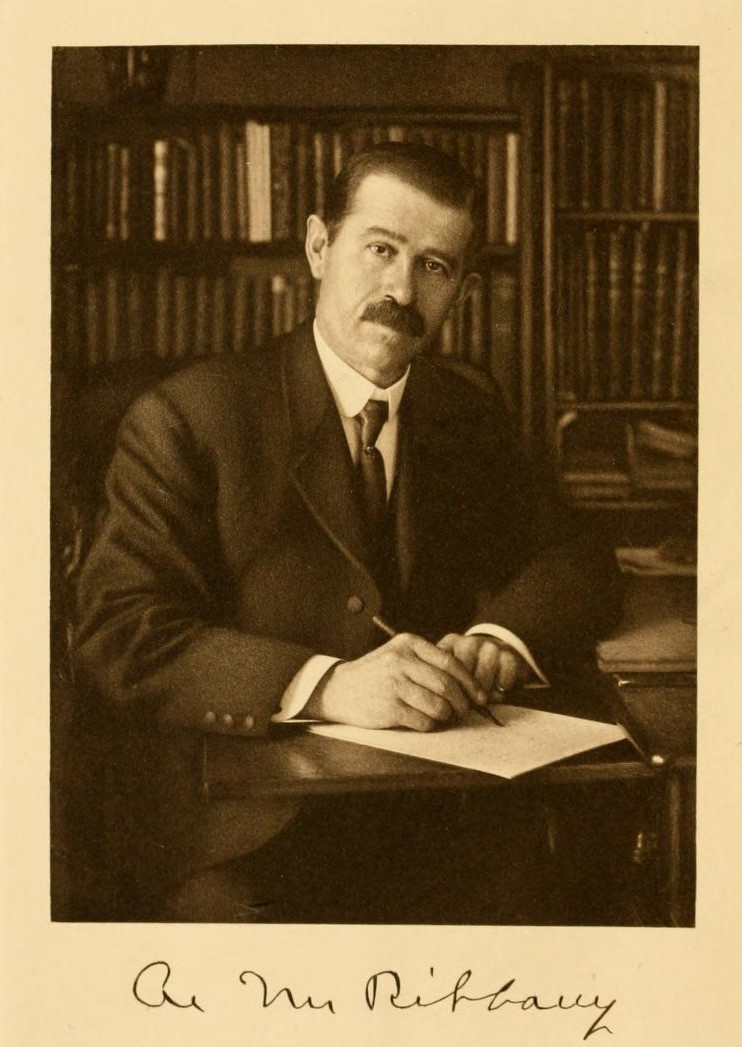
- Abraham Mitrie Rihbany in 1914
- Born: August 27, 1869; Shweir, Mount Lebanon Mutasarrifate
- Died: July 5, 1944 (aged 74); Stamford, Connecticut
- Occupation: preacher
- Writing career
- Notable work: The Syrian Christ
- Movement: Mahjar

Abraham Dimitri Rihbany known as Abraham Mitrie Rihbany (Arabic: أبراهام متري الرحباني; sometimes spelled Rahbany; August 27, 1869 – July 5, 1944) was an American theologian, philologist and historian of Lebanese descent.

"In debt and nearly penniless on his arrival in New York, he went on to become a respected clergyman and nationally recognized community leader." His best-known book, The Syrian Christ (1916), was highly influential in its time in explaining the cultural background to some situations and modes of expression to be found in the Gospels. It is still cited in both Biblical Studies and Sociolinguistics.

== Life and Works ==
Rihbany was born in Shweir, in the Mount Lebanon Mutasarrifate to a Greek Orthodox family. At 9 years old he was apprenticed to a stone-cutter, but at the age of 17 he managed to attend the American Presbyterian School in Souk El Gharb, catching up on his secondary education in two years of study and briefly becoming a teacher himself. It was here that he became a Presbyterian, in spite of his family's long adherence to the Greek Orthodox Church of Antioch.

In 1891 Rihbany emigrated to the United States, in the first instance to New York City, where he briefly edited Kawkab Amirka (The Star of America), North America's first Arabic-language newspaper. He left New York in 1893 and travelled through the Mid-West, funding short stints of study at Manchester University (Indiana) (1894) and Ohio Wesleyan University (1895–96) by giving lecture tours to churches on the culture of the Holy Land as a key to the Scriptures. He indefinitely postponed his studies after being offered a position as a resident Congregationalist minister in Morenci, Michigan. Thereafter he served as minister for two years in Mount Pleasant, Michigan, and for nine in Toledo, Ohio, ending up at the Church of the Disciples, a Unitarian church in Boston, Massachusetts.

His first book, A Far Journey (1913), was an account of his life in Syria and America. His publisher promoted it as a "bridging of the thousands of years that separate Turkey and the United States".

His ideas about the importance of Levantine culture to an understanding of the Gospels were developed in a series of articles for The Atlantic Monthly, and in 1916 published in book form as The Syrian Christ. This went through numerous American and British editions up to 1937, was translated into German, and has more recently been translated into Arabic and reissued in English.

During the First World War, Rihbany began writing on political issues. His Militant America and Jesus Christ (1917) made a case for American involvement in liberating the homeland of Jesus from Ottoman rule and argued against Christian pacifism. The following year he brought out America Save the Near East, which sold out three editions in twelve months. In it he advocated American trusteeship over an independent Greater Syrian federal republic. Rihbany believed that America stood alone in lacking imperial ambitious in the region and that the United States was uniquely equipped to reshape the region in a progressive fashion. It was due to this publication that he came to attend the Paris Peace Conference, 1919, where he became attached to the entourage of Emir Faisal, the leader of the Arab delegation, as a translator. A Greater Syrian state (the Kingdom of Syria) did briefly come into existence under Faisal before the French Mandate of Syria was imposed in 1920. Rihbany's account of the peace conference, Wise Men from the East and Wise Men from the West, was in part published in Harper's Magazine (Dec. 1921) before being issued as a book.

While promoting Arab nationalist and Anti-Zionist ideas, Rihbany did not stop writing religious pamphlets for the American Unitarian Association, as well as more substantial works of spiritual reflection. One British reviewer of his Seven Days with God commented on his "keen spiritual insight and considerable vigour of thought".

Rihbany died in Stamford, Connecticut, in 1944.

== List of his books ==
- A Far Journey. London: Constable; Boston and New York: Houghton Mifflin, 1914.
- The Syrian Christ. Boston: Houghton Mifflin, 1916.
- Militant America and Jesus Christ. Boston and New York: Houghton Mifflin, 1917.
- America Save the Near East. Boston: Beacon Press, 1918.
- The Hidden Treasure of Rasmola. Boston and New York: Houghton Mifflin, 1920.
- Wise Men from the East and from the West. Boston and New York: Houghton Mifflin, 1922.
- The Christ Story for Boys and Girls, illustrated by Gustaf Tenggren. Boston and New York: Houghton Mifflin, 1923.
- Seven Days With God. Boston and New York: Houghton Mifflin, 1926.
- The Five Interpretations of Jesus. Boston: Houghton Mifflin, 1940.

== See also ==
- List of Arab American writers
