= Woman's Club of Minneapolis =

Historic women's club in Minneapolis

- Symbol: Norway Pine Trees; Slogan: Age and Youth in Action; Motto: Etoile du Nord (the North Star)

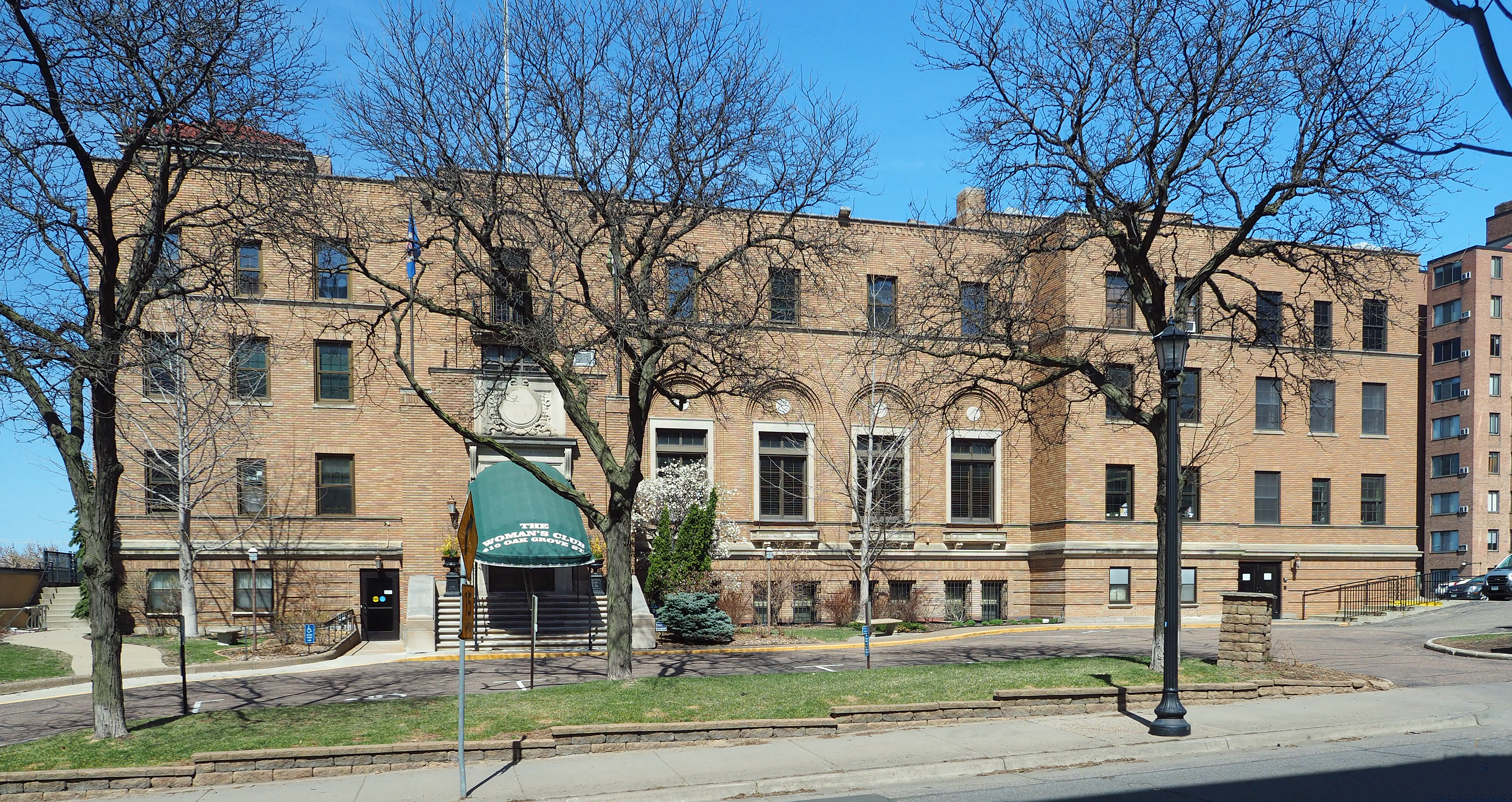
- The front facade of the clubhouse

- Location within Minnesota Location within the United States
- Abbreviation: WCOM
- Formation: 1907
- Founders: Gratia Countryman, Ruth Keyes, & Jean Sherwood Rankin
- Type: Women's club
- Coordinates: 44°58′04″N 93°17′05″W
- Region served: Minneapolis–Saint Paul
- Members: 280 (2025)
- President: Lois Carlson
- Website: www.womansclub.org
- The Woman's Club of Minneapolis
- U.S. National Register of Historic Places
- Minneapolis Landmark
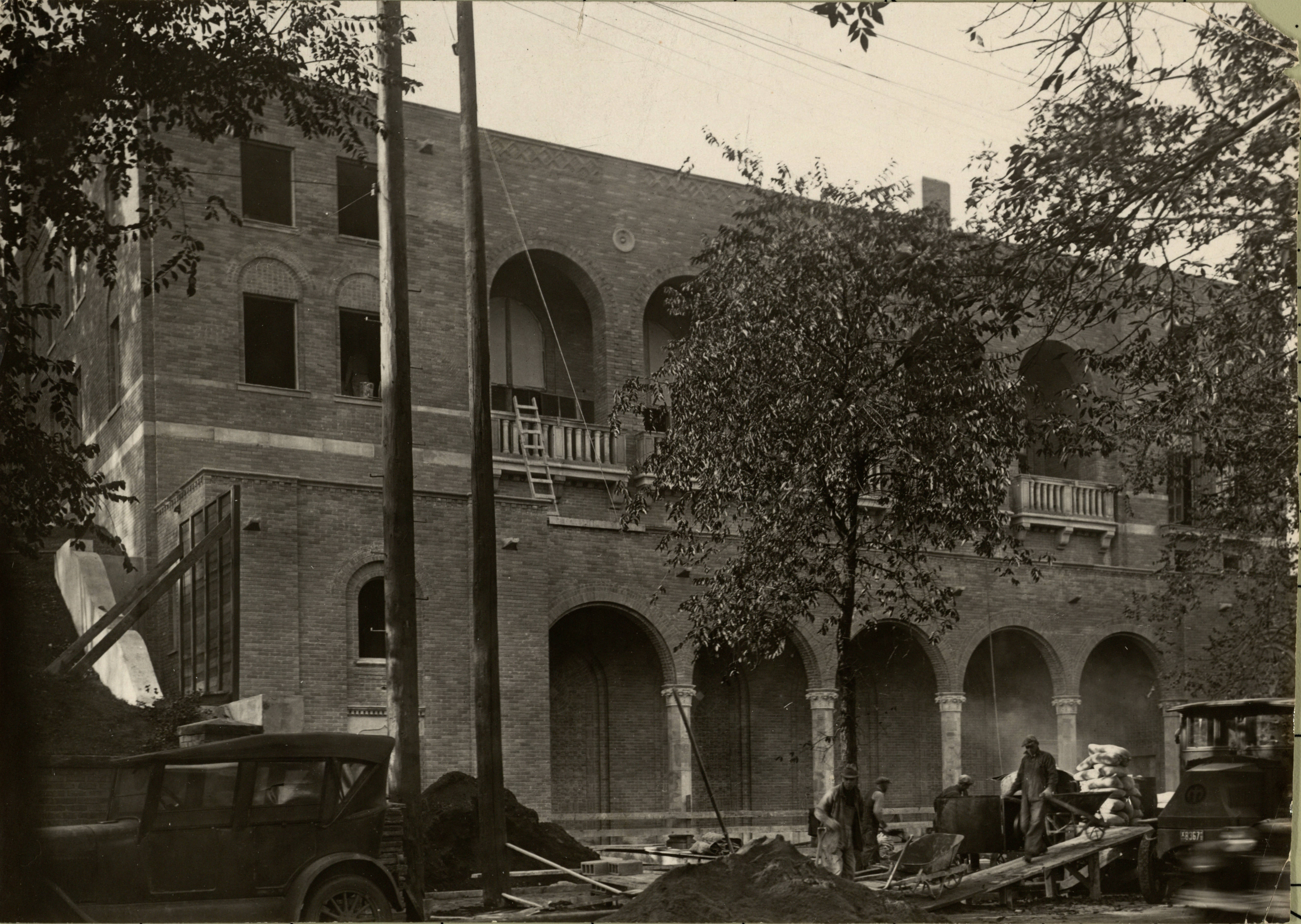
- The back of the building during construction
- Location: 410 Oak Grove Street; Minneapolis, Minnesota 55403
- Area: Loring Park
- Built: 1928
- Built by: Madson Construction Co.
- Architect: Léon Eugène Arnal with Magney & Tusler
- Architectural style: Italian Renaissance Revival
- NRHP reference No.: 04000955

Significant dates
- Added to NRHP: January 11, 2022
- Designated MPLSL: 1998

The Woman's Club of Minneapolis is a women's club in Minneapolis, Minnesota established in 1907. From 1928 to 2025, the group occupied a clubhouse now listed on the National Register of Historic Places.

== History ==
The organization began in 1907 when Ruth Keyes and Jean Sherwood Rankin proposed the idea to Gratia Countryman, the Chief Librarian of the Minneapolis Public Library. Prominent early members included community activist Clara Ueland, suffragist Maud Conkey Stockwell, and politician Mabeth Hurd Paige. The women elected author Alice Ames Winter as their first president.

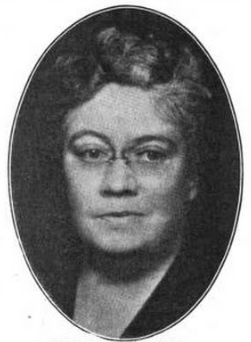
Alice Ames Winter, the club's first president

The WCOM grew quickly, exceeding 1,000 members by 1921. In 1928, the group opened a dedicated clubhouse in the Loring Park neighborhood.

The club engaged in regular charitable work. It set up a free eye clinic, sewed masks during World War II, provided scholarship, and built playgrounds. The group also tackled social issues of the day including working to prevent spoiled milk, serving school lunches below cost, teaching English language classes to immigrants, and providing fresh meals for unhoused people in Minneapolis.

The club also hosted a variety of events including educational lectures by Helen Keller, Winona LaDuke, Eve Ensler, Louise Erdrich, Olivia de Havilland, Alex Haley, Hubert Humphrey, Nelson Rockefeller, Phyllis Schlafly, Maria von Trapp, and Frank Lloyd Wright. Musical performances included Bright Eyes, Low, Magnetic Fields, Lissie, and Trampled by Turtles. In 1996, ukelele player and falsetto singer Tiny Tim died off stage during a charity fundraiser.

In 1990, membership became open to men for the first time. In 2006, the WCOM celebrated their centennial.

As women gained increasing access to the workplace and professional organizations competed for their time, fewer new members joined the club: membership peaked at 1,850 in the 1950s, declined to 700 by 2006, and dwindled to just 280 in 2025. By that point the group could no longer afford to operate their clubhouse so the members voted to sell it, but planned to continue meeting elsewhere.

== Building ==
Architect Léon Eugène Arnal designed the 1928 clubhouse which cost $300,000 (equivalent to $5,625,000 in 2025). The Italian Renaissance Revival building is set into a hill with the front facing Oak Grove Street while the back faces the Loring Park Pond. The exterior of the building uses multiple shades of tan brick with stone belt courses and windowsills.

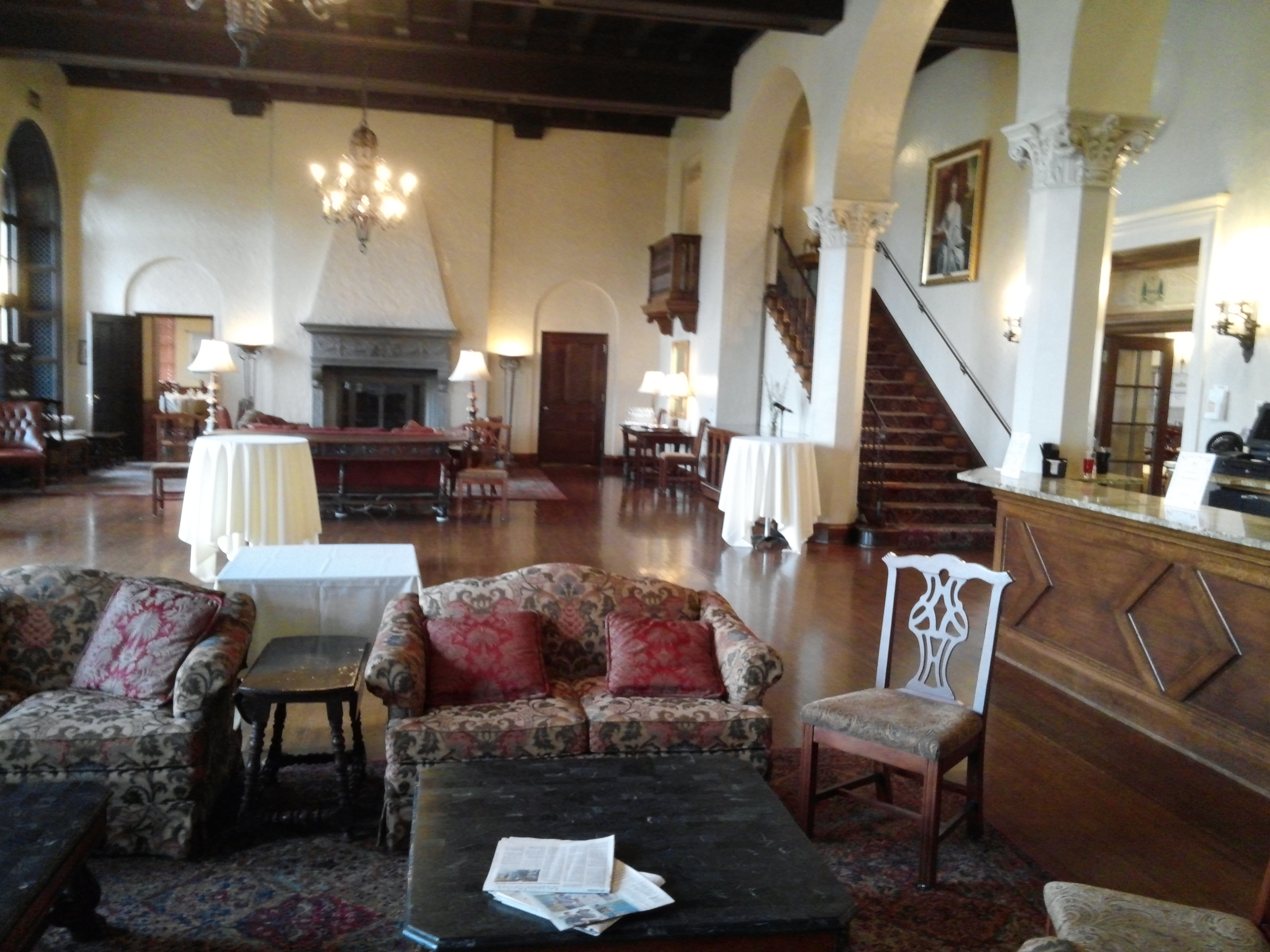
Main lounge with stone fireplace and open stairs

On the front facade, the main entrance consists of limestone stairs with a balustrade below a stone medallion with the club's name. Corbelled arches emphasize the four largest windows. The back of the building has a ground-level arcaded loggia with stone columns below brick loggia with balconies.

The interior includes a 650-seat auditorium, ballroom, dining room, sitting rooms, bathrooms, and library. The fourth floor serves as the formal piano nobile include a two-story lounge with a wood-beam ceiling, a stone fireplace, and open stairs behind arched columns. The upper floors originally provided bedrooms with shared baths, but the club later converted these into offices and meeting rooms.

Minneapolis designed the building as a local landmark in 1998 and the National Register of Historic Places listed it in 2022. As club membership declined, the building increasingly became a wedding venue In 2024, the building needed $30 million in repairs and the WCOM unsuccessfully requested state funding. The building closed in 2025.

== See also ==
- List of women's clubs
- List of City of Minneapolis designated landmarks
- National Register of Historic Places listings in Hennepin County, Minnesota
