= Ellen Battelle Dietrick =

American suffragist and author(1847–1895)

- Born: Ellen B. Battelle; 1847; Virginia
- Died: November 25, 1895 (aged 47–48); Boston, Massachusetts
- Other name: Ellen B. Dietrick
- Spouse: William A. Dietrick

Ellen Battelle Dietrick (1847–1895) was an American suffragist and author who was active in the movement's organizations in Kentucky and Massachusetts. She was a core member of the group that published The Woman's Bible in the 1890s.

== Biography ==
Ellen Virginia Batelle Dietrick was born in Virginia, one of several daughters of the Rev. Gordon Battelle and Maria (Tucker) Battelle. Her father had been a member of the convention that framed Virginia's constitution.

She married William A. Dietrick of Baltimore and they moved to Covington, Kentucky. There Dietrick established various organizations to aid women: a Women's Educational and Industrial Union, a day nursery, a cooperative bakery and cooking school, and a home for elderly women. She campaigned for civic reform in such areas as jail conditions and city government, and it was said of her that she "ran the town". In 1888, she was the founding vice-president of the Kentucky Equal Rights Association (KERA). The following year, Dietrick, KERA founder Laura Clay, and three other women established the Kentucky Lecture Bureau to provide free speakers on suffrage-related topics to clubs and civic organizations around the state.

She served in other official capacities in the national suffrage movement. After moving to Boston, she served as state organizer and general agent for the Massachusetts Woman Suffrage Association (1892) and secretary of the New England Woman Suffrage Association (ca. 1895). In the 1890s, she also served as the chair of press work for the National American Woman Suffrage Association (NAWSA). She later served as president of the Boston Suffrage League (founded in 1903 by William Monroe Trotter).

Dietrick lectured on equal rights and wrote for various publications, including the Woman's Journal. Her main topic was equal rights, but her 1889 book The Families of John and Jake is a treatise on the relations between labor and capital, following two families, one prosperous, and the other poor. Her last book, Women in the Early Christian Ministry, a refutation of Christian teachings that relegated women to second-class status in the world, was published posthumously in 1897. While it covered a broad ground, it included arguments aimed specifically at New York Bishop William Croswell Doane, who had spoken out strongly against universal suffrage.

Dietrick was a member of the Revising Committee for The Woman's Bible, a version with extended commentary challenging the orthodox Christian view of women's subservience to men. She lived to see only Part I published, in 1895, the year she died. Part II, published in 1898, included five commentaries signed by Dietrick and was dedicated to her memory as "the ablest member of our revising committee". One recent biblical scholar credits Dietrick as the first person to publish (in Part I of The Woman's Bible) the theory that "most of Hebrew Scripture, including the Books of Kings, was composed in the Hasmonean era", now a common view of revisionist biblical historians. This same scholar also notes that Dietrich has not been given due credit for being the progenitor of this thesis.

Dietrick died in Boston on November 25, 1895, at the age of 48 and was remembered at the following year's NAWSA convention as an exceptional advocate and writer for the suffragist cause. She is buried at Forest Hills Cemetery in Jamaica Plain, Massachusetts.

== Publications ==
- Women in the Early Christian Ministry: A Reply to Bishop Doane, and Others (Philadelphia: Alfred J. Ferris, 1897)
- The Families of John and Jake at Google Books (Cincinnati: Robert Clarke, 1889)
- The Circassian Slave in Turkish Harems at Google Books, Popular Science, vol. 44, no. 33, 1894, p. 481ff.
