= Grace A. Johnson =

American suffragist (1871–1952)

Grace Allen Johnson
- Born: Grace Allen Fitch; September 9, 1871; Maples, Indiana, U.S.
- Died: January 17, 1952 (aged 80); Cambridge, Massachusetts, U.S.
- Other name: Mrs. Lewis J. Johnson
- Occupations: Suffragist, educator, peace activist
- Spouse: Lewis Jerome Johnson

Grace Allen Johnson (commonly referred to as Grace A. Johnson; née Fitch; September 9, 1871 – January 17, 1952) was an American suffragist, educator, and peace activist known for her leadership in the women's suffrage movement in Massachusetts. Initially holding traditional views on women's roles, she became actively involved in suffrage after attending a meeting in Cambridge, England, in 1907. Johnson was the founder and president of the Cambridge Political Equality Association (CPEA), rallying public support for women's suffrage. She later focused on international peace activism and played a key role in introducing proportional representation in Cambridge in 1940.

== Biography ==
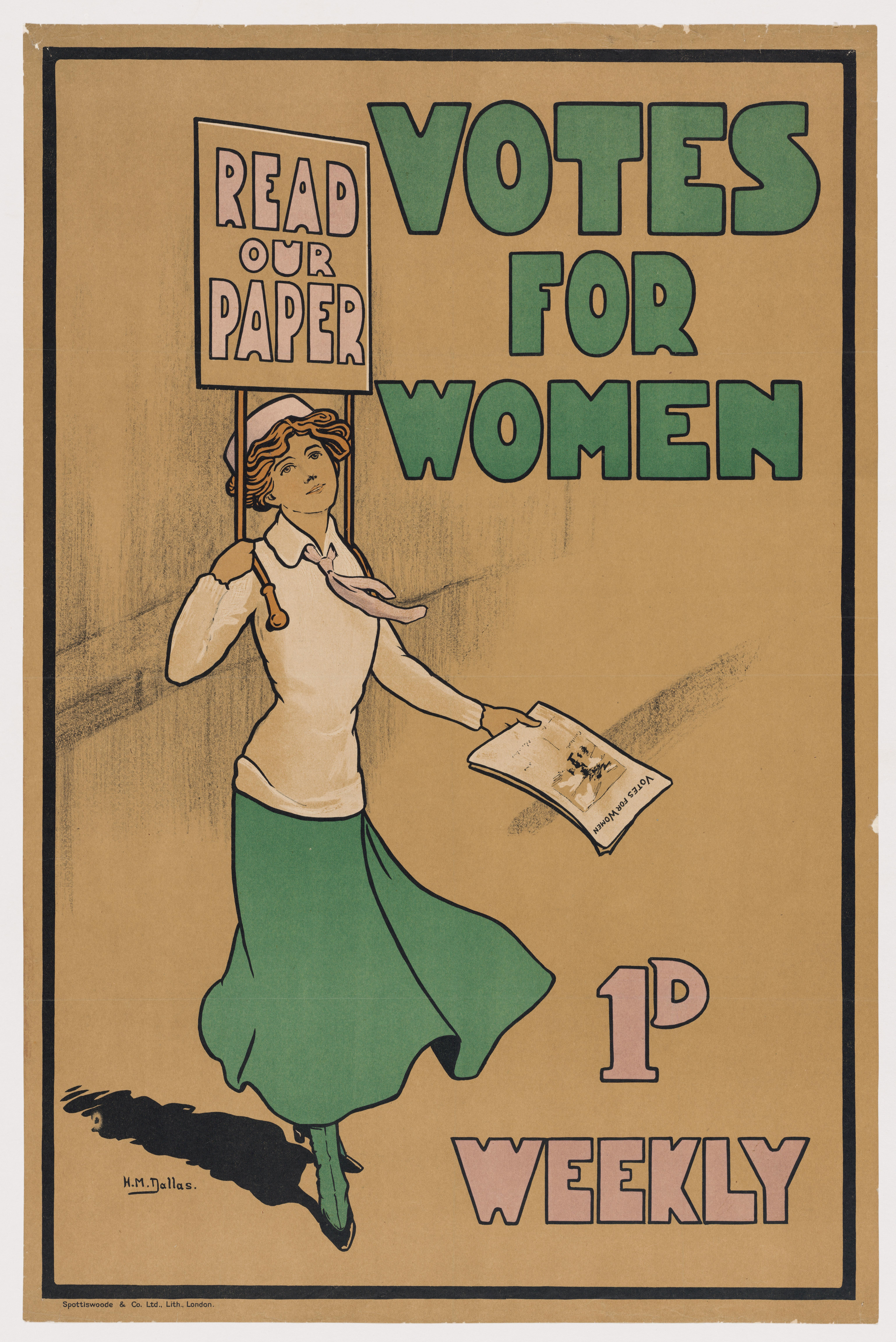
A suffragist poster from 1920 in Cambridge, MA.

=== Early life ===
Grace Allen Fitch was born on September 9, 1871, in Maples, Indiana, to Appleton Howe Fitch and Elizabeth Harriet Bennett. She spent her childhood in Kalamazoo, Michigan, before her family relocated to Hopkinton, Massachusetts. Johnson graduated from Hopkinton High School in 1890 and went on to attend the Pratt Institute Library School in Brooklyn, New York, graduating in 1891.

In 1893, Grace Allen Johnson married Lewis Jerome Johnson, a civil engineer. The couple settled in Cambridge, Massachusetts, where Lewis became a professor at Harvard University. They had two sons, Jerome and Chandler.

=== Suffrage movement ===
Until adulthood, Grace A. Johnson held the traditional view that women belonged at home, despite her husband's support for suffrage. However, this perspective shifted after she attended a pro-suffrage meeting in Cambridge, England in 1907. Upon her return to Massachusetts, she became actively involved in the suffrage movement, becoming the president of the Cambridge Political Equality Association (CPEA) of MA in 1910, which she founded in 1896.

Johnson served as president of the CPEA for six years, during which she focused her efforts on rallying public support for women's suffrage in Massachusetts. She advocated for the adoption of a state constitutional amendment to enfranchise women and played a key role in organizing suffrage rallies, canvassing voters, and writing pro-suffrage articles.

In addition to her suffrage work, Johnson was politically active in other areas. She supported the Progressive Party and favored the "single tax" on land value popularized by Henry George. In 1912, she served as a delegate and organizer to the Progressive Party National Convention in Chicago.

=== World War I and post-war activism ===
During World War I, Johnson initially opposed American entry into the conflict, but eventually supported the war effort after the United States declared war in 1917. She contributed to the war by advocating for women's suffrage and promoting other progressive causes. Following the war, Johnson continued her activism by working towards international peace.

Johnson supported the League of Nations and served as executive secretary of the Massachusetts Woodrow Wilson Foundation. She traveled to Geneva in 1926 to observe the League of Nations in action and dedicated herself to educating the public about international affairs and peace initiatives. In addition to her activism, Johnson had a distinguished career in education, teaching International Affairs and Parliamentary Procedures at the Garland School for Homemaking in Boston.

In her later years, Johnson remained committed to activism and education. She continued her advocacy for international peace and taught subjects such as International Affairs and Parliamentary Procedures until 1940. Johnson also played a role in local governance, advocating for proportional representation in Cambridge. She died on January 17, 1952, in Cambridge, Massachusetts.

== Sources ==
=== Books ===
- Berenson, Barbara F. (August 27, 2020). "Johnson, Grace Allen". American National Biography. New York: Oxford University Press. doi:10.1093/anb/9780198606697.013.369350. (subscription required)

=== Journals ===
- Gustafson, Melanie (1997). "Partisan Women in the Progressive Era: The Struggle for Inclusion in American Political Parties". Journal of Women's History. 9 (2): 8–30. doi:10.1353/jowh.2010.0559.
- Danker, Anita (2021). "in a Good Cause": Framingham and the Fight for Women's Suffrage". Historical Journal of Massachusetts. 49 (1): 42–81, X. ProQuest 2509360464.
