= Mary Hutcheson Page =

American Suffragist

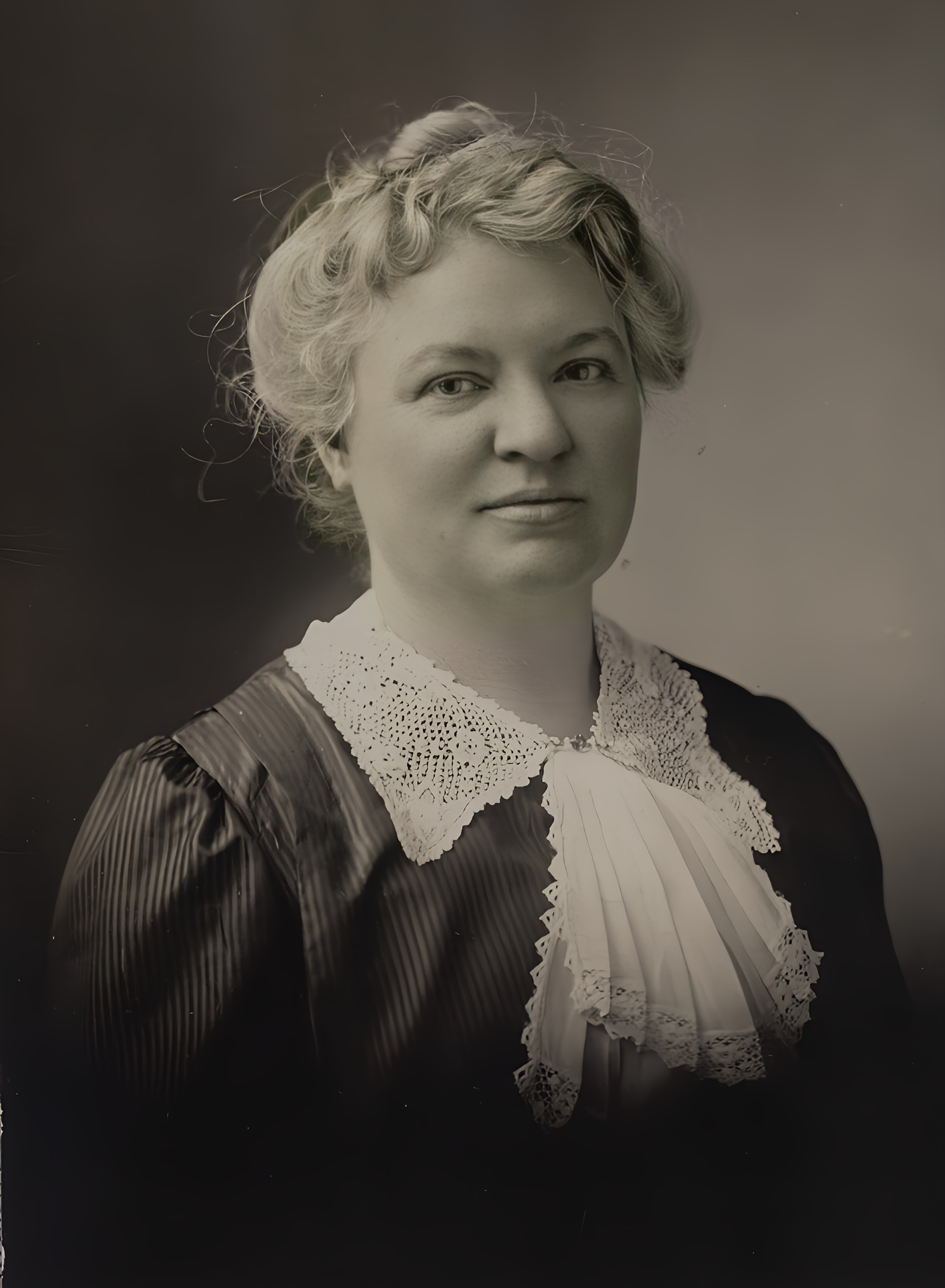
- Born: March 16, 1860; Columbus, Ohio, U.S.
- Died: 1940 (aged 79–80); Massachusetts, U.S.
- Education: Massachusetts Institute of Technology
- Known for: Women's suffrage
- Spouse: George Hyde Page

Mary Hutcheson Page (March 16, 1860 – 1940) was an American Suffragist from Brookline, Massachusetts. She was a member and leader of suffrage organizations at both the state and national levels, wrote on the subject of suffrage for a variety of publications. She worked with other American suffragists Carrie Chapman Catt and Susan B. Anthony.

== Early life ==
Mary Hutcheson Page was born March 16, 1860, in Columbus, Ohio. Her parents were Lucretia Deshler Hutcheson and Joseph Hutcheson, a banker. From ages nine to fourteen, Page lived in Europe with her parents until her father died. Her mother died a few years later, at which point Page moved to Boston.

== Adulthood ==
When Page moved to Boston, she became one of the earliest women students at the Massachusetts Institute of Technology. She was a special student there, and studied biology and chemistry.

In 1890, at the age of thirty, she married George Hyde Page. George wrote suffrage plays, poetry, and prayer, including the plays "A Choice of Evils" and "On Equal Terms," which were described by the National American Woman Suffrage Association as "being far from 'preachy,'" and as being well received in Brookline, Massachusetts where they were initially put on. They lived together in Brookline, Massachusetts, until 1918, and owned a summer home in Chocorua, New Hampshire. They went on to have four children.

== Suffrage work ==
Page was an active member and leader in many women's suffrage organizations at the state and national levels from the 1890s until her retirement (and eventual move to California) in 1918. She founded the Discussion Club of Brookline, which went on to become the Brookline Equal Suffrage Association. She was chairman, President, and member of the BESA. In the late 1890s, Page founded the Committee for Work to raise funds for the Colorado suffrage campaign, which would eventually lead to the founding of the Boston Equal Suffrage Association for Good Government in 1901. In 1893, Page served on the Literature Committee of the National American Woman Suffrage Association under Chairman Carrie Chapman Catt, but eventually gave up her position due to her extended trip to Europe planned for later that year. At the annual convention of the National American Woman Suffrage Association in 1893, Page presided over a discussion entitled "What Legislative Work Shall State and National Suffrage Associations Seek To Do; and How Shall it Be Accomplished?" In 1899, Susan B. Anthony wrote to Page to thank her for her work with Carrie Chapman Catt on the suffrage campaigns of Oklahoma and Arizona, and to ask her thoughts on acquiring equal voting rights in Hawaii.

Page was also a Chair of the Massachusetts Woman Suffrage Association, member of the National Executive Committee of the Congressional Union for Women Suffrage, and eventually became President of the National Woman Suffrage Association in 1910. She organized the Massachusetts delegation to the 1904 National Woman Suffrage Association convention, and organized the 1912 Ohio state suffrage campaign. During her time as chairman of the Industrial Committee of the Massachusetts Equal Suffrage Association, she acquired Massachusetts labor unions' endorsement for woman suffrage. Her interest in suffrage was not limited to women in the United States; Page also made several trips to Europe and corresponded with such English suffragist Emmeline Pankhurst hosting her during her 1909 trip to Massachusetts.

Page was known for her fund-raising skills and personal communication with individual women, convincing them to join the suffrage movement, but she was not an eager public speaker. She used her network of individual contacts to raise money and garner assistance, and was also a writer for both suffrage periodicals and other publications. Some titles include The Subjection of Sex and The Position of Women, and she wrote a letter in 1909 to the editor of the Boston Herald that stressed the importance of work being done by English suffragists.

Towards the end of her career, Page worked with MSWA and BESAGG to open a storefront in Boston as she began to transition her focus from scheduled, formal events to informal public action. She led the Votes for Women Committee, which was a joint project between MSWA and BESAGG, and organized a travel circuit among American towns wherein suffragists gave speeches to residents in order to gain support.

== Retirement, death, and legacy ==
In 1918, Page retired from her suffrage work and moved with her family to California. Her husband George died in 1923, at which time Page returned to Massachusetts and lived there until her death in 1940. Her daughters went on to be active suffragists. Her papers are currently held by the Schlesinger Library on the History of Women in America.
