= Clara Bancroft Beatley =

American educator, lecturer and author

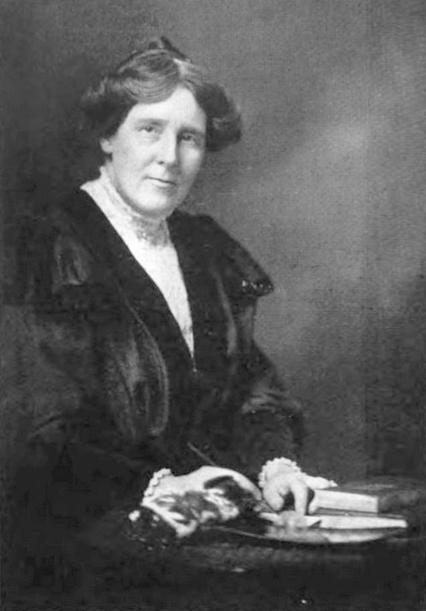
- Born: Clara Bancroft; January 12, 1858; Shirley, Massachusetts, U.S.
- Died: October 20, 1923 (aged 65); Cambridge, Massachusetts, U.S.
- Education: Bridgewater Normal School
- Occupations: Educator; lecturer; author
- Spouse: James Augustus Beatley
- Children: 4
- Parents: Edmund Dana Bancroft; Mary Park Morse Bancroft
- Writing career
- Language: English

Clara Bancroft Beatley (née Bancroft; January 12, 1858 – October 20, 1923) was an American educator, lecturer, and author, as well as a clubwoman and suffragist. As a descendant of staunch Unitarians, for many years, she served as the principal of the Church of the Disciples school in Boston, Massachusetts.

== Early life and education ==
Clara Bancroft was born in Shirley, Massachusetts, January 12, 1858. Her father, Edmund Dana Bancroft, a native of Pepperell, Massachusetts, and in early life a teacher, was the son of Luther and Anna Bancroft, who were members of the Unitarian Church in Pepperell. Upon removal to Shirley, Mr. Bancroft became the organist and choir leader of the First Congregational (Unitarian) Church, rendering that service for 45 years. He was president of the North Middlesex Conference. Beatley's mother, Mary Park Morse, was a native of Shirley and the descendant of Unitarian parents and grandparents. She died at the age of 32 years. Phoebe Bridge Barrett of Shirley, the mother who brought up the family of four children, was also a descendant of staunch Unitarians. Her siblings included sisters, Kate and Mary.

After a high school education, she became a student at the Bridgewater Normal School (now Bridgewater State University) where she completed an advanced course. The Unitarian influence of the home was so strong that it was considered an act of disloyalty to attend the services of other churches. When Beatley was a student at the Bridgewater Normal School and asked for permission at home to attend the services of the Orthodox Congregational Church (the service generally attended by the student body), a decisive "no" was meant to teach her the lesson of loyalty to the family's church.

== Career ==
After leaving the Bridgewater Normal School, she taught in the grammar and high schools of Cambridge, Massachusetts, and Boston. while teaching in Cambridge, at the age of 25, she went for the first time to the Church of the Disciples on West Brookline Street, Boston, to hear the preacher, Rev. James Freeman Clarke, and after hearing Clarke a second time, continued in attendance of that church.

Beatley undertook the charge of the Disciples Church's Sunday school in September 1893 and continued in charge for 15 years. During the time, with much timidity, Beatley assumed the title of "Principal of the Disciples School" in preference to Superintendent of the Sunday School, believing it dignified the work.

Beatley was a familiar presence to many churches and branch alliances through New England and the Middle States, for she was in great demand as a speaker. As a school lecturer, topics included "Great Sons and Daughters" and "Morals through Reverence". She gave many addresses before Alliance Branches and Clubs, selections from which were printed in Joys beyond Joy (James H. West Company, Boston, 1902). The booklet contained half a dozen poems and four brief chapters on "The Mood of Power", "Reverence", "The Things we need", and "The Joys of Responsibility".

She compiled Apples of Gold, a book of selected verses, in 1903. It contained verse gathered from many well-known sources, the poets Lowell, Emerson, Longfellow, Tennyson, Bryant, Whittier, Shakespeare, Wordsworth, and the Brownings being liberally drawn upon. There was also much material from a wider range, including writers of the era. Beatley's aim was to gather under convenient topical heads, such as "Progress", "Nature", "Duty", "Truth and Freedom", "Self-control", twenty in all. The further purpose of bringing together poems and parts of poems suitable for memorizing was also a guiding motive.

Forget Me Not was compiled in 1906, in association with Anna Stearns. Beatley also compiled several services for Sunday schools.

== Affiliations ==
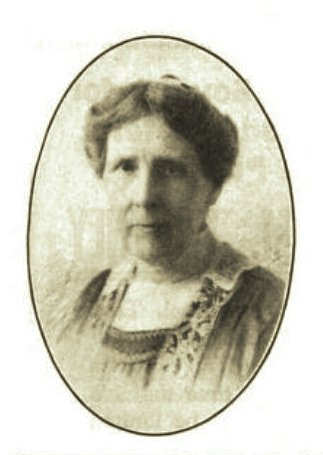
Clara Bancroft Beatley (1922)

Beatley was a director of the Children's Mission for several years. She served as chair of the Moral Education Department of the Boston Equal Suffrage Association, as well as chair of the Conference Committee for Moral Education, a committee made up of delegates from many women's clubs and other organizations interested in promoting Moral Education. In 1909, members of nineteen of Boston's best known and most exclusive women's clubs came together to develop "Virtue advertisements" which would be posted on Boston's street cars in support of moral reform; Beatley served as the committee chair.

She served two terms of three years each as director of the Unitarian Sunday School Society, and since the formation of the Unitarian Hospitality Committee in 1900, she served as its secretary, assuming the executive work. She was a member of the Board of Managers of the Tuckerman School, and of the Daughters of the American Revolution. In 1897–98, she served as Treasurer of the Boston Browning Society.

== Personal life ==
In the Church of the Disciples, she married James Augustus Beatley. They had four children, two daughters and two sons.

Mr. Beatley was also a Unitarian, being prominent for several years as Superintendent of the Sunday school in Chelsea, Massachusetts. He was for many years a Master in The English High School of Boston. The Beatleys were interested in the call extended to the Rev. Charles Gordon Ames as successor to James Freeman Clarke, and participated actively in the church work of that leader.

Clara Bancroft Beatley died on October 20, 1923, at Cambridge, Massachusetts.

== Selected works ==
Apples of gold

- Reverence : its cultivation and perversions, 1892
- Apples of gold; a book of selected verse, 1901 (Text)
- Joys beyond joy, 1902
- Treasures new and old; a memorial to James Freeman Clarke, celebrating the one hundredth anniversary of his birth, 1910
- A Christmas service and songs around the Christmas tree, 1911
- Forget-me-not; a year of happy days, 1912 (Text)
- Disciples services, 1912
- Social service for young people in the church school, plan of the Disciples school, Church of the Disciples, Boston, Mass (n.d.)
- How to organize a Sunday School. (n.d.)
