= Cambridge Political Equality Association =

Suffragist organization

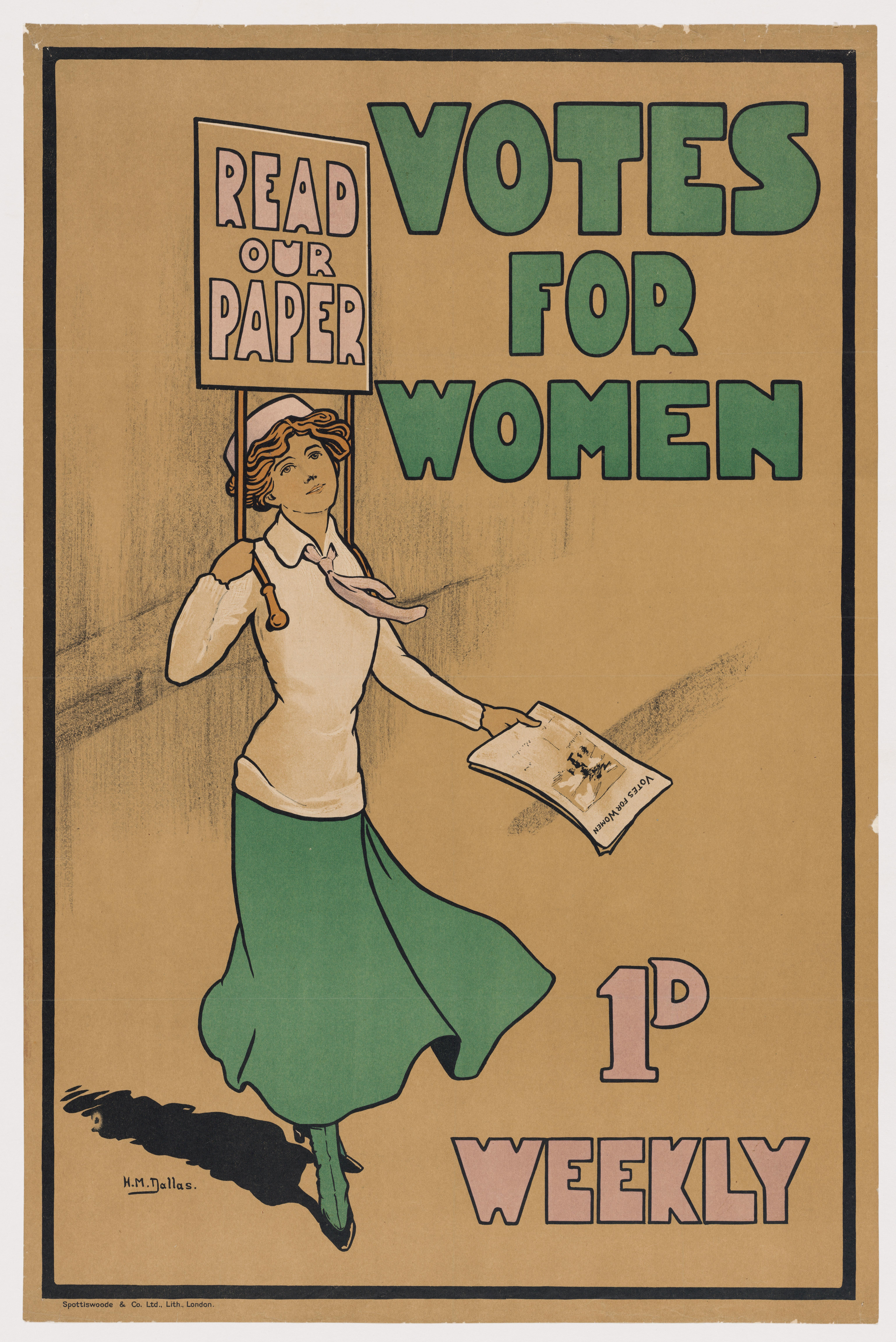
- Founded: 1896
- Founder: Grace A. Johnson
- Purpose: Women's rights, feminism, women's suffrage, suffrage
- Location: Cambridge, Massachusetts

The Cambridge Political Equality Association (CPEA) was an American women's suffrage organization founded in 1896 which was dissolved in 1920.

== Background ==
The CPEA was founded by Grace A. Johnson, otherwise known as Mrs. Lewis J. Johnson, in order "to extend study and discussion with a view to securing political equality for American citizens". The organization was centered on suffrage for women and worked toward its goal with meetings and lectures around the city of Cambridge, Massachusetts. After 1900, CPEA also organized parades and rallies in addition to raising money through rummage sales and bazaars for women's suffrage. Although the group's main goal was women's suffrage, CPEA also worked on issues of suffrage for African American women and proportional representation of all American citizens.

The organization held annual business meetings in order to present reports about the CPEA and also to elect new officers or to re-elect current officers. The meetings often took place at the home of one of the members and would end with dinner or a skit. The organization also held conferences reporting on the work of Cambridge suffragists done over the preceding months or past season. These meetings also were a platform to recognize elected officials who supported women's suffrage, such as Massachusetts Governor David I. Walsh in 1914, and to memorialize the number of suffragists enrolled in the city, 1758 in 1914.

The CPEA became associated with the Massachusetts Woman Suffrage Association, which was a state chapter of the National Woman Suffrage Association (later to become the National American Woman Suffrage Association, as it merged with the American Woman Suffrage Association), and also worked with the Cambridge Woman Suffrage Party. Grace A. Johnson, who served as the president of CPEA until 1916, was also an officer in the Cambridge Public School Association, which played a significant role in CPEA's campaign to encourage women to register and vote in school committee elections.

The CPEA was the forerunner of the Cambridge League of Women Voters, which formed in 1920 after the Nineteenth Amendment was passed, and was a local offshoot of the national organization, the League of Women Voters.

== Members ==
The following women have been part of the Cambridge Political Equality Association:

President:

1. Grace A. Johnson (1899–1916)

First Vice President:

1. Mrs. Ellen F. Adams (1912–1913)

Honorary Vice President:

1. Mrs. John Graham Brooks (1912)
2. Mrs. Lionel S. Marks (1912)
3. Dr. Charles Fleischer (1912)
4. Rev. George Hodges, D.D. (1912)
5. Mrs. Ada Eliot Sheffield (1912)
6. Dr. Walter Wesselhoeft (1912–1913)

Directors:

1. Mrs. George W. Blackwell (1912)
2. Mrs. F. Lowell Kennedy (1912)
3. Mrs. Emma Blanchard (1912)
4. Miss Elizabeth B. Piper (1912)
5. Mrs. Arthur N. Holcombe (1912)
6. Mrs. Henry W. Savage (1912)

Treasurer:

1. Mrs. G.H. Parker (1912)
2. Mrs. F. Lowell Kennedy (1913)

Recording Secretary:

1. Miss Miriam Gage (1912)

Corresponding Secretary:

1. Mrs. Edward C. Jeffrey (1912)
2. Mrs. Margarette B. Krebs (1913)

== See also ==
- Feminism
- National American Woman Suffrage Association
- League of Women Voters
- Women's suffrage in the United States
