= Elizabeth Porter Gould =

American poet (1848–1906)

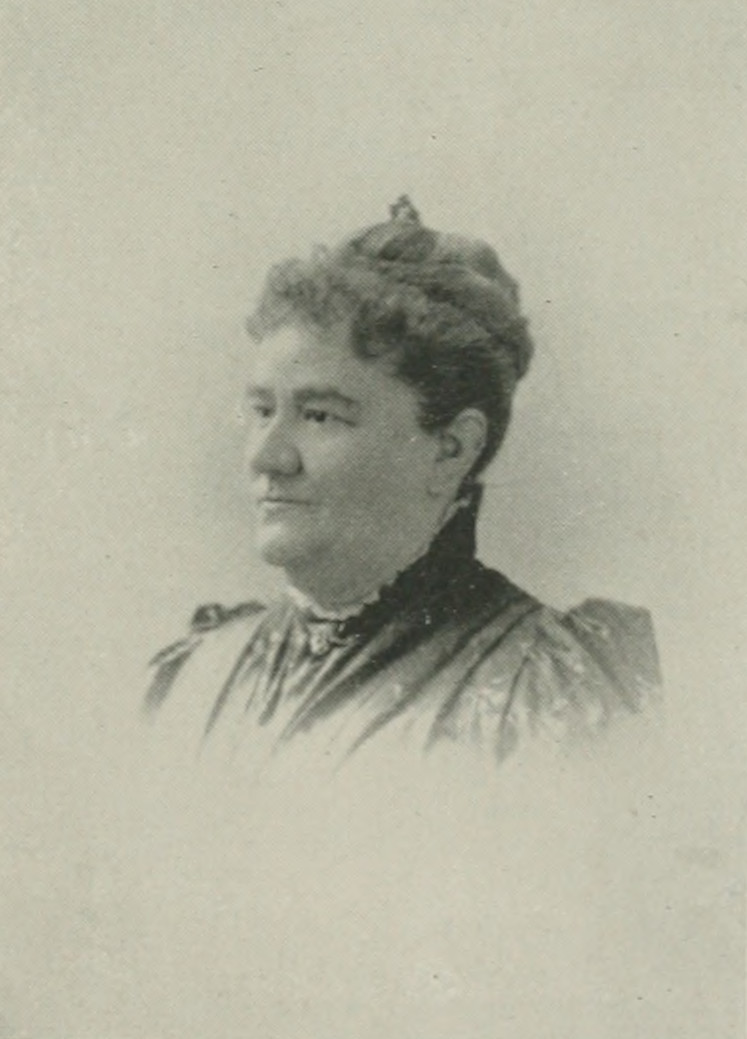
- Born: June 8, 1848 Manchester-by-the-Sea, Massachusetts, US
- Died: July 28, 1906 (aged 58) Boston, Massachusetts, US
- Genre: poetry and essays

Elizabeth Porter Gould (June 8, 1848 – 1906) was an American poet, essayist, and suffragist who edited an early anthology of selections from Walt Whitman's work and wrote extensively on subjects related to education.

== Early years and family ==
Elizabeth Porter Gould was born in Manchester-by-the-Sea, Massachusetts, the daughter of John Averell Gould and Elizabeth Cheever (Leach) Gould. Among her New England ancestors were the schoolmaster Ezekiel Cheever, Massachusetts Bay Colony Governor Thomas Dudley, and colonist Zaccheus Gould. The family moved to Chelsea when she was a girl.

== Literary career ==
Gould published several collections of her own verse, including Stray Pebbles from the Shores of Thought (1892) and One's Self I Sing, and Other Poems (1904). She wrote lyrics for a number of songs, including "Columbia—America", which became the anthem of the Massachusetts chapter of the Daughters of the American Revolution.

Gould greatly admired the poetry of Walt Whitman, and in 1889, she published a collection of extracts from his poetry, Gems from Walt Whitman. It also included a poem she wrote in honor of Whitman and an essay, "Walt Whitman Among the Soldiers". It was the first time that Whitman had allowed anyone but his editor William Rossetti to publish such selections and he regretted it afterwards (as he had previously with Rossetti), feeling that his poetry did not lend itself to fragmentary extracts. The novelist William Dean Howells, however, wrote that Gould's book "shows [Whitman] in his supreme moments" with passages likely to offend contemporary middle-class taste "wisely left out". Several critics felt that Gould's edition was useful for its potential to draw new readers to Whitman — which was indeed one of Gould's primary reasons for issuing the collection. An unusual feature of the book was that it was wider than it was tall (7 x 5.5. inches) in order to accommodate Whitman's long poetic lines without breaking them.

In 1900, Gould published a study of Anne Gilchrist, Whitman's friend and fellow writer. Anne Gilchrist and Walt Whitman presents an idealized view of Gilchrist and her relationship with Whitman, but it was carefully researched and one of the first books to provide a substantive account of Gilchrist's critical abilities and her importance in Whitman's life.

Gould published frequently on education. She wrote on a wide range of subjects, including schooling in China, education for the deaf, the Turkish high school Robert College, the German educator Friedrich Fröbel, the Indian education reformer Pundita Ramabai, the American schoolmaster Ezekiel Cheever, and the early teaching experiences of John Adams and Daniel Webster. Publications for which she wrote included the New York Critic, New England Magazine, and Century Magazine. She also lectured extensively on women's education, women's suffrage, and other subjects, including the lives of Abigail Adams, Mary Somerville, and Caroline Herschel.

Gould was active in civic and reformist organizations, including the Massachusetts Woman Suffrage Association, the Massachusetts Society of Good Citizenship, the Massachusetts Society for the University Education of Women, and the Woman's Board of Foreign Missions.

A small collection of her papers, including correspondence and a scrapbook, is held by the Peabody Essex Museum.

== Books and pamphlets ==
- Ezekiel Cheever, Schoolmaster, 1872
- Gems from Walt Whitman, 1889
- Stray Pebbles from the Shores of Thought, 1892
- How I Became a Woman Suffragist, ca. 1893
- Anne Gilchrist and Walt Whitman, 1900
- One's Self I Sing, and Other Poems, 1904
- A Pioneer Doctor: A Story of the Seventies, 1904
- John Adams and Daniel Webster as Schoolmasters, 1904
- The Brownings and America, 1904
