= Charles Gordon Ames =

American clergyman (1828–1912)

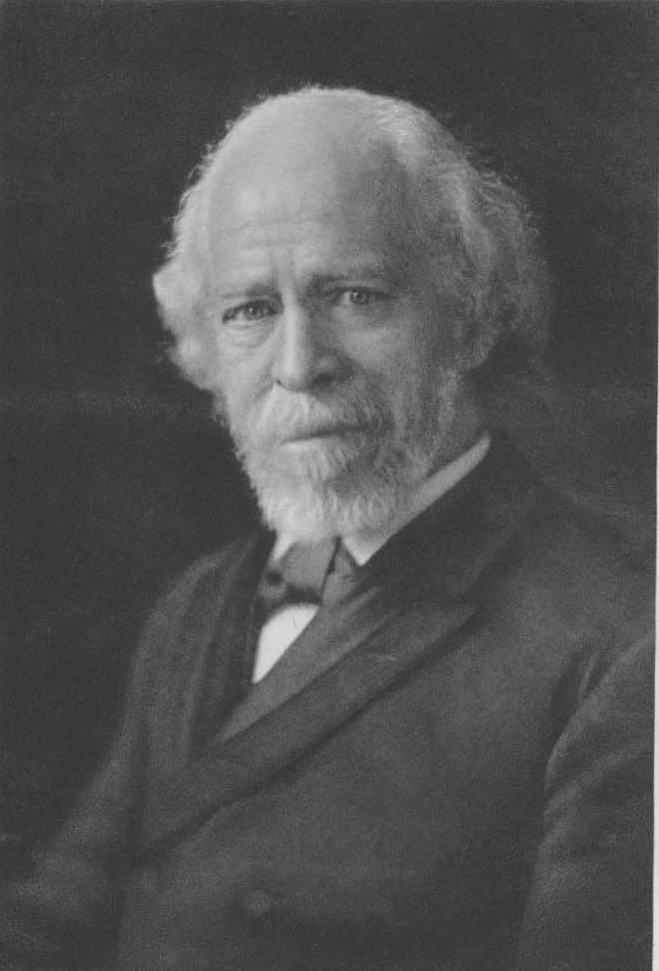
- Born: October 3, 1828; Dorchester, Boston, Massachusetts, U.S.
- Died: April 15, 1912 (aged 83); Boston, Massachusetts, U.S.
- Education: Geauga Seminary
- Occupations: Clergyman; editor; lecturer
- Spouse(s): Sarah Jane Daniels (m. 1850; died 1861) Fanny Baker Ames (m. 1863)
- Children: 3

Charles Gordon Ames (October 3, 1828 – April 15, 1912) was an American Unitarian clergyman, editor and lecturer.

== Early life and education ==
Charles Gordon Ames was born on October 3, 1828, in Dorchester, Boston. He was a foundling, adopted by the Lucy (née Foster) and Thomas Ames of Canterbury, New Hampshire, when he was three years old. Ames spent his early years on a farm and at the age of 14, he entered the printing office of the Morning Star, a religious paper of the Free Will Baptists in Dover, New Hampshire. At the age of 18, he became a boy preacher, became licensed, and peached in northern Ohio. He graduated from the Geauga Seminary of Ohio, and was ordained in November 1849 as a Free Will Baptist.

== Career ==
Ames returned to New England and preached in Tamworth, New Hampshire. He became the founding minister for a Free Will Baptist church in Minneapolis (then St. Anthony) in 1851. He was secretary of the founding meeting of the Minnesota branch of the Republican Party in 1854, and from 1855 to 1857 edited the Minnesota Republican, the first Republican paper in the Northwest. He found his congregation wanting in the faith and attitude he expected, and after five years he left the Minneapolis church, and, for a time, the ministry in 1856. He was elected register of deeds and served from 1857 to 1858.

Ames organized a society in Bloomington, Illinois, in 1859 and presided with them until 1862. He was a pastor in Cincinnati, Ohio, for a time. He was a pastor in Albany, New York, from 1863 to 1865. In 1865, he was sent to California by the American Unitarian Association and did some educational work in San Francisco with the group. He remained there until 1872. He was pastor of the Unitarian Church in Germantown, Philadelphia, from 1872 to 1877. He edited the Christian Register of Boston from 1877 to 1880. In 1880, he formed the Spring Garden Unitarian Society in Philadelphia and presided over it for eight years. In 1881, he was elected as a member to the American Philosophical Society. On January 1, 1889, Ames succeeded reverend James Freeman Clarke as pastor of the Church of the Disciples in Boston.

== Personal life ==
Ames married Sarah Jane Daniels, daughter of John Daniels, on March 28, 1850. His wife died in 1861. He later married activist Fanny Baker Ames, daughter of Increase Baker, of Cincinnati on June 25, 1863. He had one son and two daughters, Charles Wilberforce, Alice Vivian and Edith Theodora.

Ames died on April 15, 1912, at his home on Chestnut Street in Boston.

== Publications ==
- Baynes, T. S.; Smith, W. R., eds. (1885). "Pennsylvania" . Encyclopædia Britannica. Vol. 18 (9th ed.). New York: Charles Scribner's Sons. (with J. Peter Lesley)
- George Eliot's Two Marriages (1886)
- As Natural as Life (1894)
- Hidden Life, a collection of poems
- Poems (1898)
- Sermons of Sunrise (1901)
- Five Points of Faith (1903)
- Living Largely (1904)
- Peter and Susan Lesley
- A Book of Prayers

== Awards ==
In 1896, he received the degree of D.D. from Bates College.
