= Sarah E. Wall =

Sarah Elizabeth Wall (February 19, 1825 – June 13, 1907) was a prominent leader in the woman's suffrage movement in the United States. She lived in Worcester, Massachusetts, where she led a successful anti-tax protest that defended a woman's right not to pay taxation without representation.

== Advocacy for women's suffrage ==
A member of the Massachusetts Woman Suffrage Association, Wall, a Republican, was an active proponent of a woman's right to vote for over three decades in the late 19th century. Wall is perhaps most widely recognized for initiating an anti-tax protest in which she encouraged women not to pay taxes until they were granted the right to vote. Soon after she began this movement, the Worcester city tax collector sued Wall for refusing to pay taxes, and the case reached the Massachusetts Supreme Court in 1863. In "Wheeler v. Wall," the court ruled against Wall and held that despite not having the right to vote, women are still obligated to meet their tax burden. Even still, Wall refused to cooperate with the collector, and as a result, officers seized and sold her property in order to raise the money necessary to meet her tax obligation. After several years, Wall's inexorability eventually prevailed, as the collector began to ignore Wall and allow her to abstain from paying taxes. In 1884, Susan B. Anthony cited Wall's audacity and willingness to stand up for women's suffrage, stating, "for the last twenty-five years, [she] has resisted the tax gatherer when he came around. I want you to look at her. She looks very harmless, but she will not pay a dollar of tax. She says when the Commonwealth of Massachusetts will give her the right of representation she will pay her taxes."

Wall zealously argued that women were as capable as men of making appropriate voting choices. She cited the feats of renowned women in history such as Zenobia, ruler of Egypt, and Joan of Arc, submitting that these women's accomplishments are no less impressive because of their gender. Intriguingly, Wall thus argued that the "political nonentity of women was of modern origin," holding that women of the past used to be judged based on their rank, not solely on their gender.

== Bibliography ==
- Orange Grove (1866), originally published anonymously but later credited to Wall
