= Massachusetts Woman Suffrage Association =

The Massachusetts Woman Suffrage Association (MWSA) was an American organization devoted to women's suffrage in Massachusetts. It was active from 1870 to 1919.

== History ==
The MWSA was founded in 1870 by suffrage activists Julia Ward Howe, Lucy Stone, Henry Browne Blackwell, and others. It was affiliated initially with the national American Woman Suffrage Association, which had been founded the previous year, and later became a chapter of the National American Woman Suffrage Association (NAWSA). One of its own affiliates was the Cambridge Political Equality Association.

The MWSA lobbied for women to get the vote and the right to be officials of civic organizations such as school boards, educated people about women's rights, organized public demonstrations such as rallies and parades, and coordinated with suffrage associations in other states. Among the people active in the MWSA were physician Martha Ripley, social activist Angelina Grimké, reformer Ednah Dow Littlehale Cheney, and suffragist Susan Walker Fitzgerald.

In 1892, the recent merger of several national suffrage associations and other factors prompted Alice Stone Blackwell and Ellen Battelle Dietrick to write a new constitution for the MWSA that would expand its capacities and funding base (e.g. by making it possible for the MWSA to receive bequests). The new MWSA was incorporated in December of that year. A decade later, in 1901, it merged with a smaller Massachusetts suffrage organization, the National Suffrage Association of Massachusetts. By 1915, the MWSA had over 58,000 members. Others involved with the organization included Margaret Foley, Sarah E. Wall, and Jennie Maria Arms Sheldon. During her senior year at Radcliffe College, Maud Wood Park was invited to speak at their annual dinner.

Between 1904 and 1915, the MWSA was headquartered at 6 Marlborough Street in Boston's Back Bay, afterwards the headquarters of the Women's Municipal League of Boston and then the home of physician Louis Agassiz Shaw, Jr.

In 1920, after the passage of the 19th Amendment to the Constitution gave women the vote, the MWSA became the Massachusetts League of Women Voters.

Records pertaining to the history of the MWSA are held by Radcliffe College's Schlesinger Library.

== Notable people ==
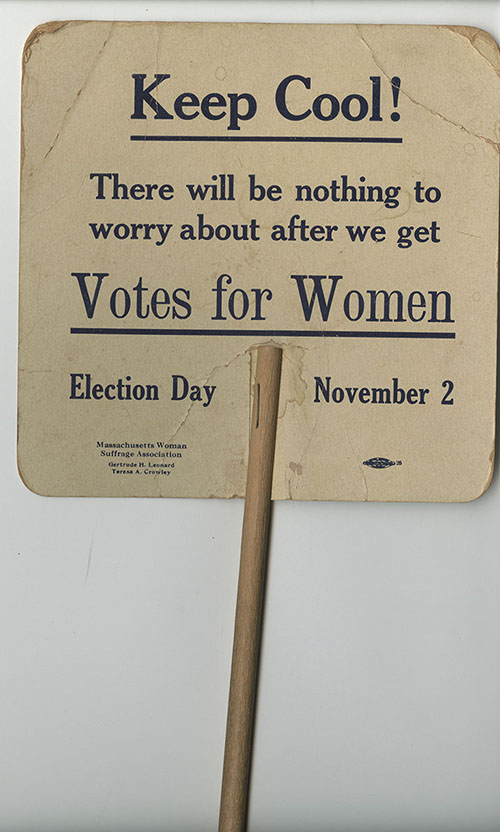
Women's suffrage fan from the MWSA

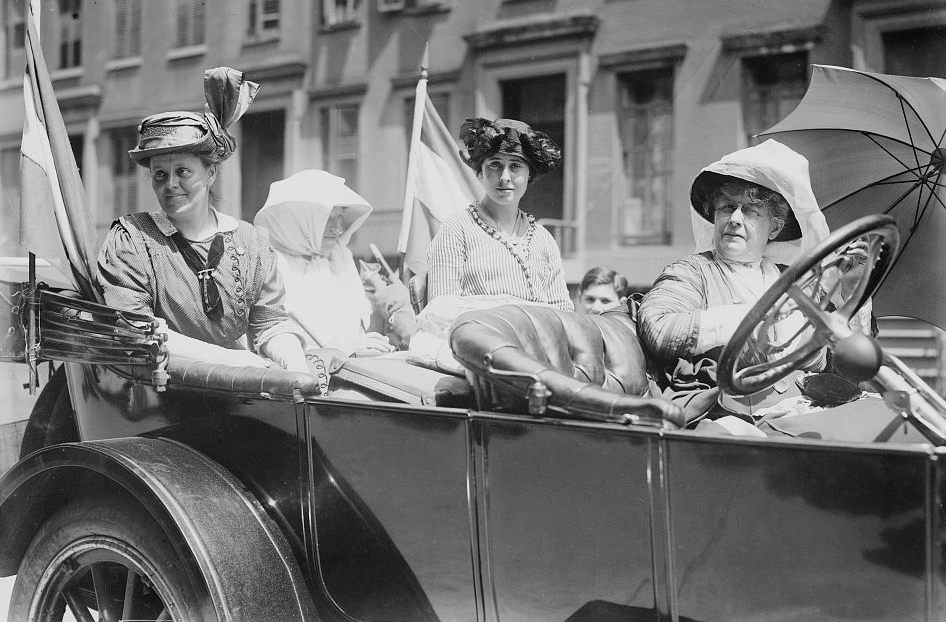
Massachusetts suffragist Susan Walker Fitzgerald with Harriot Eaton Stanton Blatch, Maggie Murphy, and Emma Bugbee circa 1910

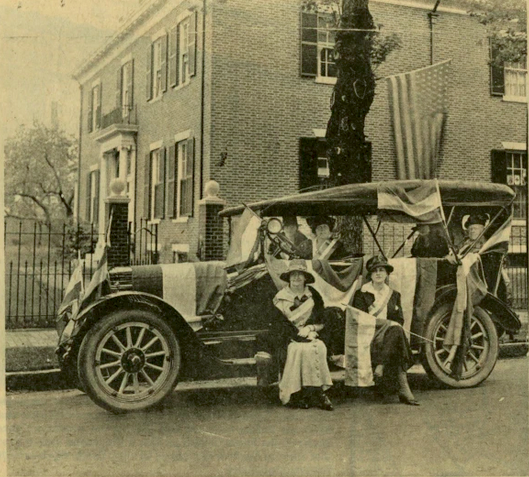
Suffragists in Cambridge

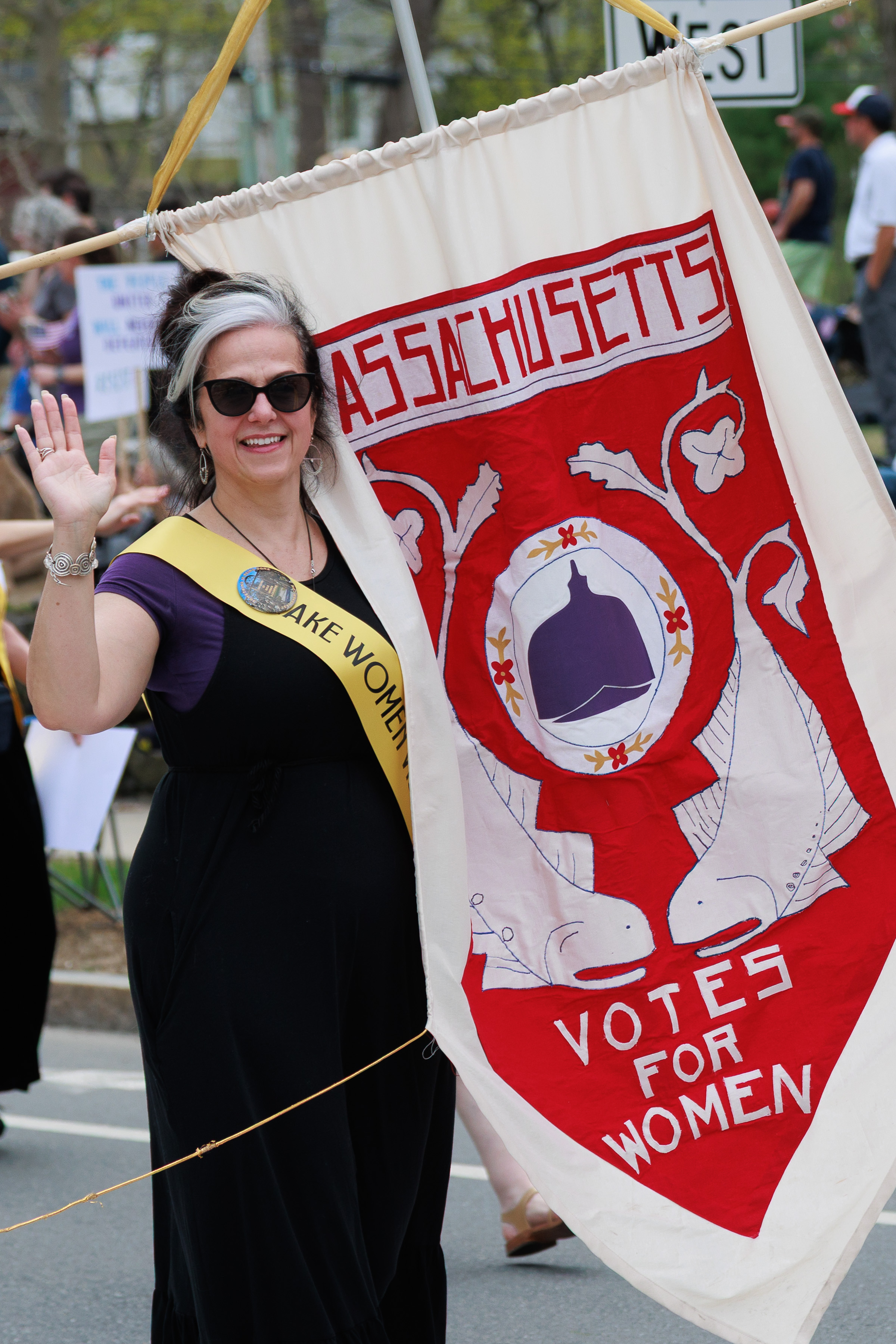
A 21st century suffragist pays tribute

- Mary Chandler Atherton
- Margaret W. Campbell
- Eva Channing
- Ednah Dow Littlehale Cheney
- Martha E. Sewall Curtis
- Mary Dennett
- Ellen Battelle Dietrick
- Susan Walker Fitzgerald
- Margaret Foley
- Elizabeth Porter Gould
- Angelina Grimké
- Julia Ward Howe
- Martha Seavey Hoyt
- Mary Livermore
- Abigail Williams May
- Maud Wood Park
- Almira Hollander Pitman
- Martha Ripley
- Harriette R. Shattuck
- Jennie Maria Arms Sheldon
- Sarah E. Wall

== See also ==
- Boston Equal Suffrage Association for Good Government
