= Boston Equal Suffrage Association for Good Government =

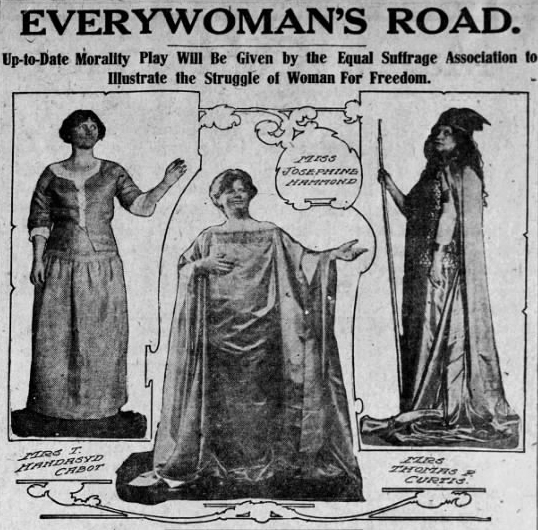
Women of BESAGG in costume for a play performed in Jordan Hall in 1913 to raise funds for the Woman's Journal.

The Boston Equal Suffrage Association for Good Government (BESAGG) was an American organization devoted to women's suffrage in Massachusetts. It was active from 1901 to 1920. Like the College Equal Suffrage League, it attracted younger, less risk-averse members than some of the more established organizations (such as the Massachusetts Woman Suffrage Association). BESAGG played an important role in the ratification of the 19th amendment in Massachusetts. After 1920, it became the Boston League of Women Voters.

== History ==
The Boston Equal Suffrage Association for Good Government (BESAGG) was founded in 1901 by Maud Wood Park, Pauline Agassiz Shaw, and Mary Hutcheson Page, among others, "...to promote a better civic life, the true development of the home and the welfare of the family, through the exercise of suffrage on the part of the women citizens of Boston." Shaw, a wealthy philanthropist and social reformer, was its first president.

Originally BESAGG sought to address a range of issues, such as poverty and prison reform, as well as suffrage. By 1910 it was focusing almost exclusively on suffrage. Winning the vote was challenging enough in Massachusetts, which was notorious for its anti-suffrage movement. Even efforts to win municipal voting rights for women were unsuccessful. In 1915 a state constitutional amendment that would have given women the vote was defeated in a popular referendum.

BESAGG was the smallest and most important of the three main suffrage organizations active in Massachusetts after 1900. The older, more established, Massachusetts Woman Suffrage Association (MWSA) was allied with the Woman's Christian Temperance Union and the virulently anti-Catholic Loyal Women of America. The College Equal Suffrage League (CESL), also founded by Maud Wood Park, was specifically designed to attract college students and alumnae to the suffrage movement.

When BESAGG was founded, the suffrage movement in Massachusetts was flagging. Its members were drawn from the middle and upper classes and its campaign methods were conventional and restrained. Looking to British suffragists such as the Pankhursts for inspiration, BESAGG began experimenting with more aggressive tactics. Members such as Susan Walker Fitzgerald and Florence Luscomb campaigned door to door in immigrant neighborhoods, handing out Yiddish and Italian leaflets. They held spontaneous outdoor meetings on crowded street corners, attracting the attention of the press. In 1909, they made headlines by selling suffrage newspapers on the street with the newsboys. They campaigned against anti-suffrage candidates, leading to the defeat of two state senators: Roger Woolcott in 1912 and Levi Greenwood in 1913. They took trolley tours of Massachusetts, making speeches at every stop along the way. Margaret Foley, an Irish-American factory worker, went to factories at noon and spoke to the workers. BESAGG also educated women about the functions of government so they would be well-informed voters when the time came. Clara Bancroft Beatley served as chair of the Moral Education Department.

By 1914, women's suffrage had the support of the Democrats, the Progressives, the Socialists, the State Federation of Labor, and Massachusetts governor David Walsh. When the 19th amendment passed in 1919, Massachusetts was the eighth state to ratify it. Afterwards, BESAGG became the Boston League of Women Voters.

== See also ==
- Women's suffrage organizations
- List of suffragists and suffragettes
- Timeline of women's suffrage

== Sources ==
- Scott, Anne Firor; Scott, Andrew MacKay (1982). One Half the People: The Fight for Woman Suffrage. University of Illinois Press. p. 29. ISBN 9780252010057.
- Strom, Sharon H. (September 1975). "Leadership and Tactics in the American Woman Suffrage Movement: A New Perspective from Massachusetts". The Journal of American History. 62 (2): 296–315. doi:10.2307/1903256. JSTOR 1903256.
- "Boston Equal Suffrage Association for Good Government. Records in the Woman's Rights Collection, 1916-1920: A Finding Aid". Harvard University Library. Archived from the original on 2015-11-27.
- "Everywoman's Road. Up-to-Date Morality Play Will Be Given by the Equal Suffrage Association to Illustrate the Struggle of Woman for Freedom". The Boston Globe. March 16, 1913 – via Newspapers.com.
