= Missionary Church of the Disciples of Jesus Christ =

Evangelical non-profit religious organization based in West Covina, CA

- Classification: Evangelical
- Theology: Trinitarianism
- Governance: Apostolic Order
- Structure: Hierarchical
- Director: Ceasar Rivera Lewis
- Region: North America and Latin America
- Headquarters: Covina, California, U.S.
- Founder: Ernest William Sellers
- Separations: Iglesia Evangelica Internacional Soldados de la Cruz de Cristo: https://en.soldadosdelacruz.org/
- Members: 2,000–3,000
- Official website: https://www.disciplesofjesuschrist.org

The Missionary Church of the Disciples of Jesus Christ is an evangelical non-profit religious organization based in West Covina, CA. The group consists of 2,000 to 3,000 members throughout North America and Latin America. Members, referred to as missionaries, who come from a variety of different socio-economic backgrounds, dedicate their time to spreading the word of God. Training before becoming missionaries include reading and studying the Bible daily, praying and communal events. Using the Bible as their source of doctrine, adepts carry out various activities such as spiritual counseling, disaster relief teams, seasonal programs that consist in the distribution of food and toys for the community, missionary training programs, and charity works through the collection of donations.

The group believes in the tenets of the New Testament and uses the Ten Commandments as their moral and spiritual guide. The missionaries are best known for their distinct uniforms which include white garments decorated with burgundy stripes. They also observe the Sabbath, the biblical Laws of Health, Divine Healing and adhere to the Discipleship as a way of life.

== Beliefs and creed ==
Their creed in a nutshell may be found in the What We Believe section of their website. It is a Christian-Judeo denomination distinguished by the observance of the Sabbath and emphasis in the Second Coming of Christ. Its theology corresponds to the Christian teachings of biblical infallibility and the Trinity. Although similar in beliefs to the Seventh-Day Adventist Church, it differs in the belief of a more rigid system of keeping the Sabbath and the keeping of the Commandment by avoiding images of all sorts in their homes and on themselves.

=== Baptism ===
The doctrine embraces Trinitarianism, immortality of the soul, and immersion baptism as the first step towards salvation as cited in Matthew 28:19 on their official website. According to the Bible those ages 12 and up may be baptized.

=== Keeping the Sabbath ===
Every Saturday, members gather to commemorate the commandment which declares that the seventh day be kept holy. Any daily activities are paused on this day and instead are replaced with worship from Friday sunset to Saturday sunset.

== Practices ==
=== Discipleship ===
Those who wish to become full members of the organization, can become disciples. This position designates members to become learners of the Bible with combined worship.

=== Evangelism ===
This organization is also known for their door to door preaching approach. Members can be seen spreading their literature in the form of pamphlets and offering bible studies.

=== Faith healing ===
Through a strict prayer routine and a spiritual mindset, those who are granted the discipleship, carry out activities that involve praying for any one who is in need of being healed of a spiritual or physical illness. This activity may be carried out either in public or in private.

=== Dietary guidelines ===
Members ascribe to the dietary laws described in Leviticus and requires members to eat accordingly. Eating unclean animals such as pork is forbidden.

== History ==
=== Background (1922–1929) ===
Ernest William Sellers (better known as Daddy John) was born on August 30, 1869, in Portage County, Wisconsin. His family were members of the Methodist Church. In 1924, George Smith, a Christian missionary, was said to have revealed the doctrine of Christ to Ernest. In the years 1922 to 1924, Sellers started preaching in Cuba in his own place of business where he sold toys and sorts. Sellers would later turn this same business establishment into a worship center called "Misión Gedeon" (Gideons’s Mission). In 1928, Sellers was greeted at his place of living by two spiritual beings who revealed to him that images of all sorts could not be present in any form. After this meeting, Sellers declared September 30 to be the "Day of the Holocaust" in which all images of all types would be brought by the parishioners to burn at a bonfire in commemoration of the Second Commandment. Sellers started to preach the revealed doctrine, visiting eight countries in the Americas before returning to Cuba in 1930.

=== The church under Sellers (1930–1953) ===
On March 25, 1930, Sellers officially established the church in Cuba as Iglesia Bando Evangélico Gedeón or Gideon Evangelical Band Church. His first church activities included a large scale preaching campaign and divine healing which yielded successful results. From June 13, 1928, up until his death in 1953, together with his wife Muriel C. Sellers oversaw the work in Cuba from his central headquarters in Playa Baracoa. In 1939, Sellers created a monthly newspaper called, El Mensajero de Los Postreros Días (The Last Days Messenger). In it, Sellers wrote world news and religious exhortations and literature. The Messenger was distributed free as a result of donations that were collected from people, which it would then go into the production of the newspaper. The donations would also go to the construction of new churches and to support other church activities.

As head of the church, throughout the years, Sellers reorganized and changed the internal disciplines of the church. Sellers created a strict hierarchy within the church. Sellers appointed Mayordomos de Provincia (Provincial Church Administrator) and Mayordomos de Distritos (District Church Administrator) to head the regional sections of the church. They in turn had to report to the Mayordomo General (General Church Administrator), Sellers, and their monthly activities; some of these were published in The Messenger. Sellers took on the title of Bishop around 1939. All members of the church had to report their whereabouts and activities in writing to the church administrator who in turn would deliver them to the main headquarters. Other ranks included: Member, Good Samaritan, Watchtower, Member of the Light Brigade, Disciple, Lieutenant, Captain, Teacher, Preacher, and Evangelist.

While Sellers built churches, he also preached and baptized people. Records indicate that in the late 1940s the church had well over a total of 20,000 members. The largest baptismal record made was seventy-one people in one day. Sellers, now with the title of Apostle, which was given in 1946, died on February 25, 1953, in Playa Baracoa at the age of 83.

=== Succession of Apostles (1953–1987) ===
Sellers declared that the Bishop of Great Echelon, Ángel María Hernández, would succeed him in the office of Apostle. As an Apostle, Hernández oversaw the expansion of the church into international lands such as Jamaica, Guatemala, Costa Rica, Nicaragua, El Salvador, Honduras, Chile and Haiti. He died on December 27, 1961, at the age of 61.

A year before his death Hernández announced that the new successor would be Arturo Rangel Sosa. Having been recalled from Panama by the presiding bishops, he replaced Angel María as Apostle in 1962. Rangel added Internacional (International) to the church’s name in 1964. In 1966, Rangel disappeared while on his way to Matanzas along with his brother José Rangel Sosa and an Evangelist named Heliodoro Castillo. That same year, two bishops of the church took command and established a Junta de Obispos (Board of Bishops).

Due to the escalating tensions between the Castro regime and the churches, these bishops left the country on February 27, 1968. They set up the church in Tampa, Florida but then changed the headquarters to Miami, Florida. Both bishops were assigned the ranks of Archbishop in 1971. In 1974, the church’s name was changed once again. In 1986, both Archbishops were ordained as the new Apostles. On October 14, 1987, Samuel Mendiondo, one of the two archbishops, died.

=== Reorganization (1990–1993) ===
A Bishop by the name of Rolando Gonzalez Washington, head of the church in California and the western part of the United States, disagreed with what he saw as transgressions within the church. He believed that certain changes and other things that were not permitted under the Sellers administration were now beginning to make an entrance into the church and were not part of the original doctrine proclaimed by Sellers. In early 1990, Rolando Gonzalez openly split the western section of the church from the eastern section of the church. He placed his headquarters in Bell Gardens, California and renamed the organization Church of the Soldiers of the Cross of Christ of the State of California.

=== Legitimacy (1990–1993) ===
During these years, there were a series of legal battles. In these years both factions, the California and the Florida main headquarters, found themselves embroiled in federal courts over matters of legitimacy and sovereignty. As a result, the California church had to change the appearance of its uniforms, insignias, and logos. The church renamed itself one last time, changing its name to Missionary Church of the Disciples of Jesus Christ. Reasons given for the separation were that the Miami church had deviated from the original doctrine preached by Daddy John (Ernest William Sellers) and therefore was no longer guided by the same Holy Spirit.

=== The New Church (1990–present) ===
Now officially a separate legal entity from the Miami church, the California-based Missionary Church proceeded to build more churches and missions through the work of its missionaries. Its missionaries were taught the Bible through the Estudios Biblicos program. They also went out in front of stores and supermarkets to ask for voluntary donations with plastic bags, which then evolved into the recognizable white cans that they carry today. New churches were established in different parts of the world, most notably in the Americas.

During the late 1980s and 1990s, the Missionary Church had its own radio space called Con La Biblia En La Mano (With The Bible In Hand), which transmitted every Sunday on Radio KALY. On August 26, 1993, Rolando Gonzalez was ordained as Apostle-Director. In May of that same year, he relocated the main headquarters from Bell Gardens, California to Covina, California. Gonzalez died on December 10, 2004, and was succeeded by the Bishops Caesar Rivera Lewis, Joel Gonzalez and David Higuera Rolón, marking the beginning of the Board of Bishops which ended in 2007, when Caesar Rivera was proclaimed the new Apostle-Director.

== Organization and structure ==
=== Ranks ===
The Missionary Church divides its members into ranks which carry unique responsibilities.

1. Apostle
2. Bishop
3. Major Superintendent
4. Superintendent
5. Major Supervisor
6. Supervisor
7. Super Deaconess
8. Deaconess
9. Deacon
10. Super Evangelist
11. Evangelist
12. Pastor Evangelist
13. Preacher
14. Anointed
15. Disciple
16. Member

=== Apostolic Succession ===
According to the Missionary Church, the Apostles are direct successors and continuation of the original ministry headed by the Apostle Peter. The Directorate recognizes Ernest William Sellers, Ángel María Hernández, Arturo Rangel, Samuel Mendiondo, and Rolando G. Washington as successors to the twelve apostles, hence creating the apostolic line of succession, which they call the Apostolic Family. Its duties include overseeing the entire welfare of the church and head what they refer to as The Apostolic Board of Council Officers.

=== Apostolic Board of Council Officers ===
The Apostolic Board of Council Officers is composed of the Bishops, Major Superintendents, Superintendents, Major Supervisors, and Supervisors. The officers are also in charge of safe-guarding the doctrine in their respective churches.

=== Charity through donations ===
The Missionary Church of the Disciples of Jesus Christ is best known for their white uniforms and the white donation bins. They can be seen outside stores and streetlights asking for donations that are used for charity through missionary training programs, My Father’s House (which are properties used to offer free housing, meals and clothing to people seeking spiritual guidance and as such have undergone physical or emotional hardship), Disaster Relief programs, church missions and seasonal programs for the community to receive free toys and meals.

== Culture ==
=== Annual conferences ===
Each year, the Missionary Church organizes what they call the International Annual Conferences. These conferences usually take place in the United States around March . This event sets the tone for the year and includes prayers, biblical reenacting, and the proclamation and welcoming of new members. More than 1,000 people attend this event.

=== Special programs ===
The church offers prison visitations, hospital visitations, as well as a Food and Disaster Relief program. They also offer a Youth and Preparatory School program which aims at spreading its beliefs and a Family Orientation program which aims to help families in need of moral guidance. Furthermore, The House of my Father program is a rehabilitation program which aims at providing help (free housing, food and clothing) to those in need of rehabilitation (drug, alcohol and spiritual). It has been reported that people ranging from single mothers to entire families have been a part of this program.

=== Evangelical campaigns ===
Evangelical Campaigns consist of different sections of the country which are then subdivided into their respective cities (for example, the Campaign of Southern California consists of the Campaign of Covina, etc.). This also includes other countries as well. Their main objectives are to evangelize and to work in collecting donations outside stores and streetlights for the use of Disaster Relief programs, The House of my Father program and church missions.

== Demographics ==
=== North America ===
There are several missions across the U.S. including establishments in California, Florida, Georgia, Illinois, New Jersey, Texas, Florida, Colorado, Georgia, Arizona, Nevada, and Washington.

=== Latin America ===
With several missions across Latin America, the Missionary Church has established missions in Mexico in Baja California, Chihuahua, Jalisco, Puebla, Chiapas, Campeche, and Quintana Roo.

In Central America, they have missions in Guatemala, Honduras and Costa Rica. In South America, missions have been established in Colombia and Brazil. Lastly, the Caribbean Islands currently features a mission in the Dominic Republic and Puerto Rico.

=== Europe ===
During the years 1993 to 2013, the presence of two pastors were leading a mission in Barcelona, Spain. It is reported that there were members from Russia, Czech Republic, Armenia, Brazil and Mexico at the Barcelona mission.

== External criticism ==
External critics have questioned certain practices of this organization, including the governance system and disciplines on issues such as clothing, personal adornment, banning the use of vehicles on Saturdays, and banning television. For example, an external group called the “Center for Religious Research” has classified such practices in the Missionary Church as “legalists”, arguing that such disciplines are too rigid and too unsubstantiated by the Bible.

== See also ==
- Soldiers Of The Cross Church
