= Abigail Williams May =

American social reformer (1829–1888)

- Born: April 21, 1829; Boston, Massachusetts, U.S.
- Died: November 30, 1888 (aged 59); Boston, Massachusetts, U.S.
- Occupations: Social reformer, suffragist, education advocate

Abigail Williams May (1829–1888) was an American social reformer, suffragist, and advocate for education who made contributions to the advancement of women's rights and educational policy in Massachusetts during the 19th century. She was the first cousin of the author Louisa May Alcott.

== Early life and family ==
Born on April 21, 1829, in Boston, Massachusetts, May was the daughter of Deacon Samuel J. May and Mary (Goddard) May. Her parents were supporters of the abolitionist movement and were members of congregations led by the Rev. John Pierpont and Theodore Parker. In her younger years, May traveled to Europe and later dedicated her time to raising a niece who had lost her mother.

== Career ==
May devoted her life to numerous philanthropic initiatives and social reform efforts. A staunch suffragist, she actively advocated for dress reform for women, with a focus on improving women's undergarments. May held various leadership roles, including President of the Horticultural School for Women, vice-president of the New England Women's Club, President of the Massachusetts School Suffrage Association, and vice-president of the Association for the Advancement of Women.

During the Civil War, May played an instrumental role in the organization of the Sanitary Commission. She led a group of patriotic women in Boston and Massachusetts in providing support and assistance to soldiers on the battlefield. From 1882 to 1888, she served as a trustee for the Tuskegee Institute, contributing to the growth and success of this historically black college in Alabama.

In her later years, May focused primarily on education. After being elected to and subsequently denied a seat on the Boston School Committee in 1873, she successfully campaigned for legislation that allowed women to serve on the committee. She then served two terms on the committee from 1874 to 1878. In 1879, May was appointed to the Massachusetts State Board of Education, where she supervised normal schools and provided guidance and support to both teachers and students.

== Death and legacy ==
In honor of her contributions to social reform and education, May Hall was constructed in 1889 at the Framingham Normal School, now known as Framingham State University. The building was named in tribute to May as the first woman appointed as an "official visitor" to the school by the Massachusetts Board of Education. The Abby W. May Elementary School in Roxbury is also named after her.

May died on November 30, 1888, in Boston, Massachusetts, at the age of 59. She is buried at the Forest Hills Cemetery.
