= UU World =

Unitarian quarterly magazine (Boston, 1821–1957)

- Categories: Religion
- Frequency: Weekly
- Founded: 1821
- Company: American Unitarian Association
- Country: United States
- Based in: Boston, Massachusetts
- Language: English

UU World is a quarterly magazine published by the Unitarian Universalist Association. From 1821 to 1957, it was known as The Christian Register, the leading American Unitarian weekly, published by the American Unitarian Association, Boston. In 1957 when it was "becoming less and less focused on Christianity" the title was changed to The Unitarian Register. In 1961, the journal merged with The Universalist Leader.

In its heyday it included contributions from William Ellery Channing, Henry Ware Jr., Andrews Norton, George Bancroft, Jared Sparks, and Edward Everett. In addition to articles on religion it contained comment on Massachusetts politics.
