= Sanitary Fair =

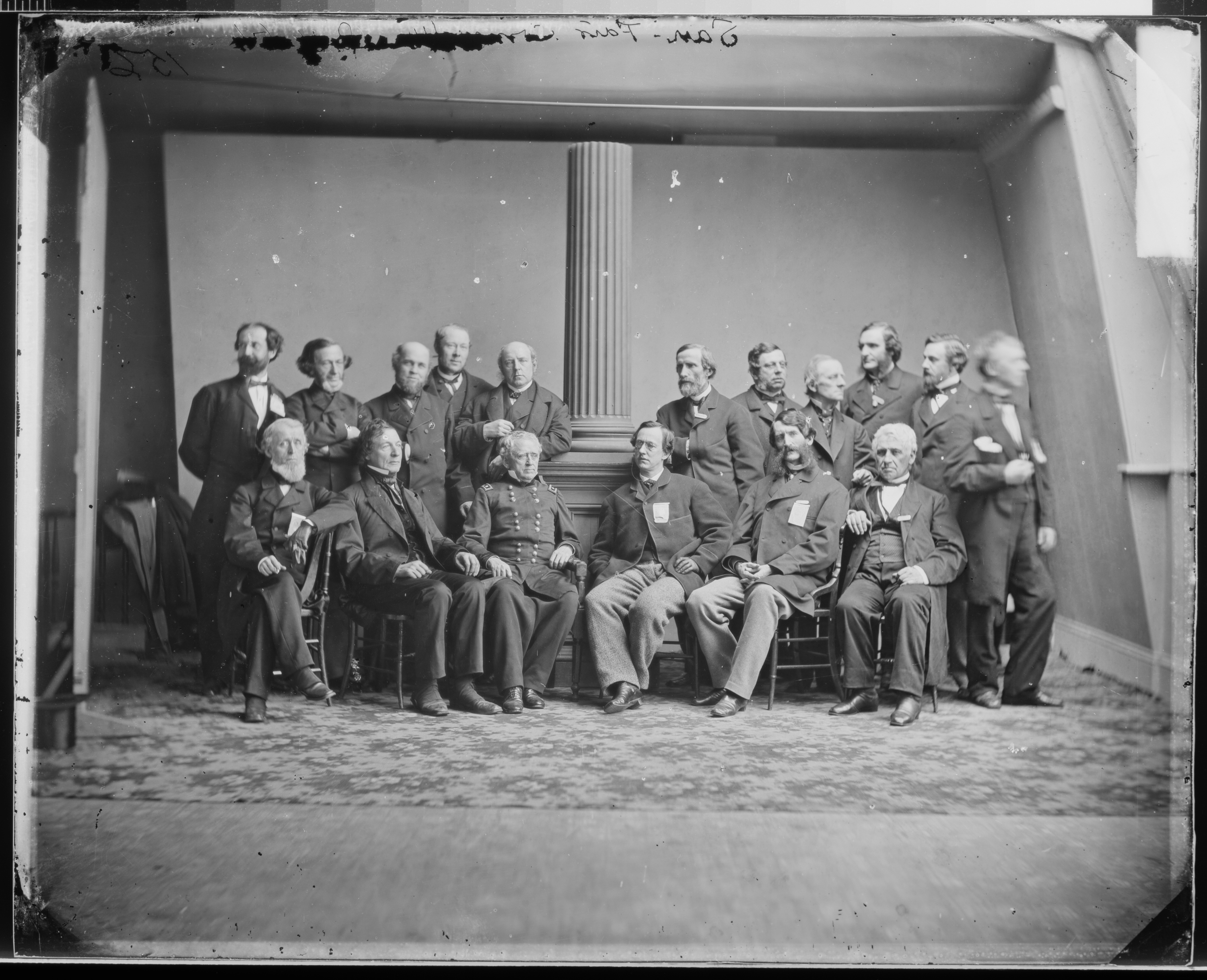
Sanitary Fair Commissary group, 1864

Sanitary fairs were fund-raising events held in various cities on behalf of the United States Sanitary Commission to raise funds and supplies for the Union Army during the American Civil War. Established in 1863, the last major event was held in 1865 in Chicago. From the outset of the USSC, many local groups sponsored fundraising events to benefit the Commission. As the civil war progressed, these became larger and more elaborate. Organizing these fairs offered ways for local communities to participate directly in supporting the war effort of the nation.

The USSC leadership sometimes did not approve of the excitement and lavishness of the fairs. They wanted to encourage sacrifice as a component of membership in a nation. Although the fairs were one way to create a national identity which might motivate citizens to perform their duties, the commission leadership did not want the fairs to become the focus of USSC work. The name "Sanitary Fair" was coined after the success of the big bazaars that took place in Chicago and shortly after in Boston during the winter of 1863–1864.

== Lowell, Massachusetts, 1863 ==
In February 1863, the women of Lowell, Massachusetts, organized a two-day "Mammoth Fair" occupying two exhibition halls and netting over four thousand dollars for the cause. Groups in other cities soon adopted this plan.

== Chicago, 1863 ==
The largest Sanitary Fair during the war was held in Chicago from October 27 to November 7, 1863. Called the Northwestern Soldiers' Fair, it raised almost $100,000 for the war effort. It included a six-mile-long parade of militiamen, bands, political leaders, delegations from various local organizations, and a contingent of farmers, who presented carts full of their crops. Chicago's Northwestern Soldiers' Fair included a "Curiosity Shop" of war souvenirs and Americana. Its organizers intended its displays of weapons, slavery artifacts and other items to illustrate for Union visitors the contrast between the "barbaric" Southern enemy and the "civilized" North. The fairs generally involved large-scale exhibitions, including displays of art, mechanical technology, and period rooms. These sorts of displays called upon ideas of the American past, a history that local communities held in common. Often, different communities competed with each other over their donations to the national cause. People in various cities and towns across the North contributed to the same war effort because they identified as having shared fortunes in their common nation.

== New York City, 1864 ==
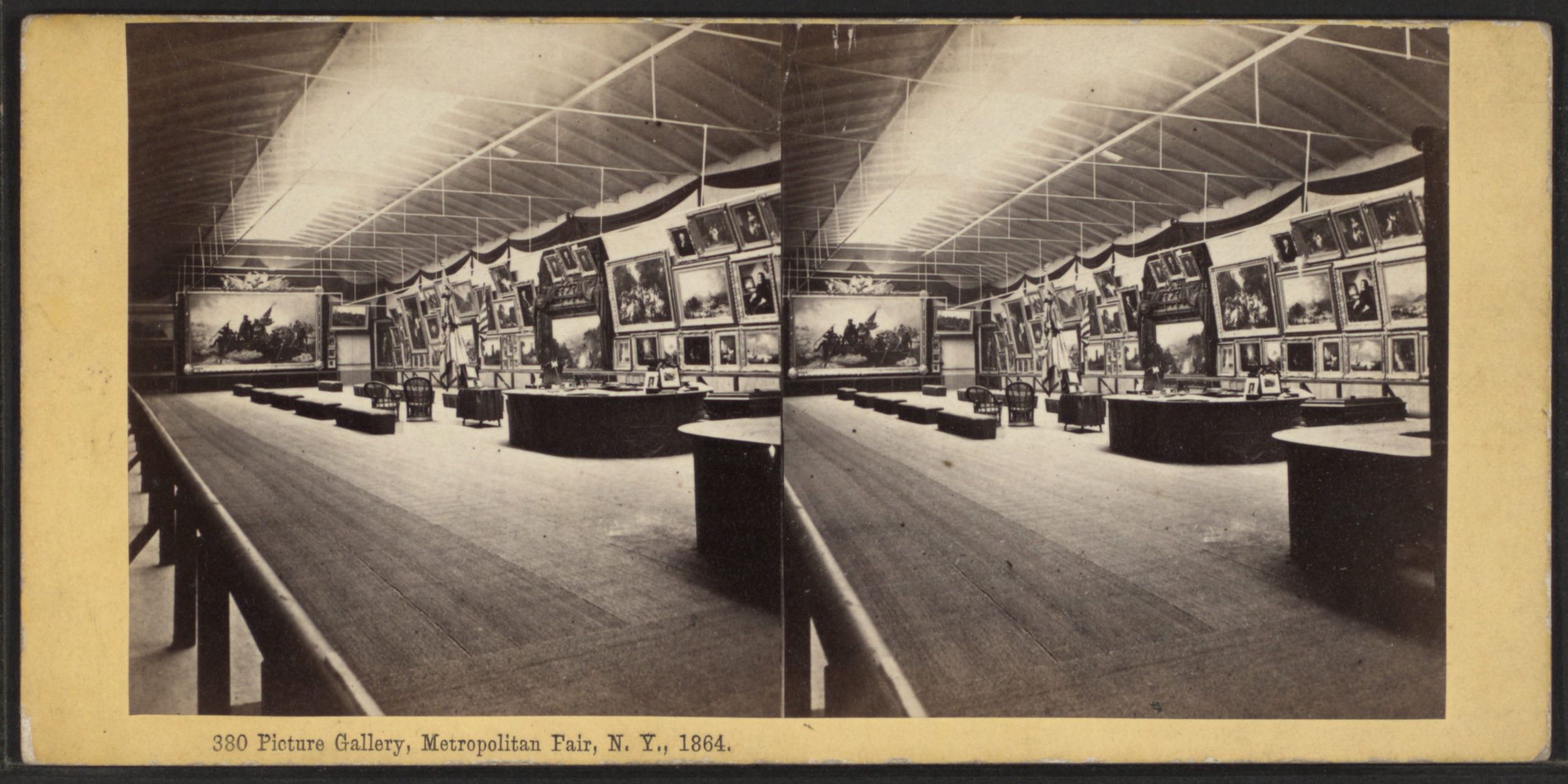
Metropolitan Fair, New York City, 1864

The Metropolitan Fair was held in New York City in April 1864. It raised over a million dollars for the Union cause. The Brooklyn and Long Island Fair in February and March had raised $400,000.

== Philadelphia, 1864 ==
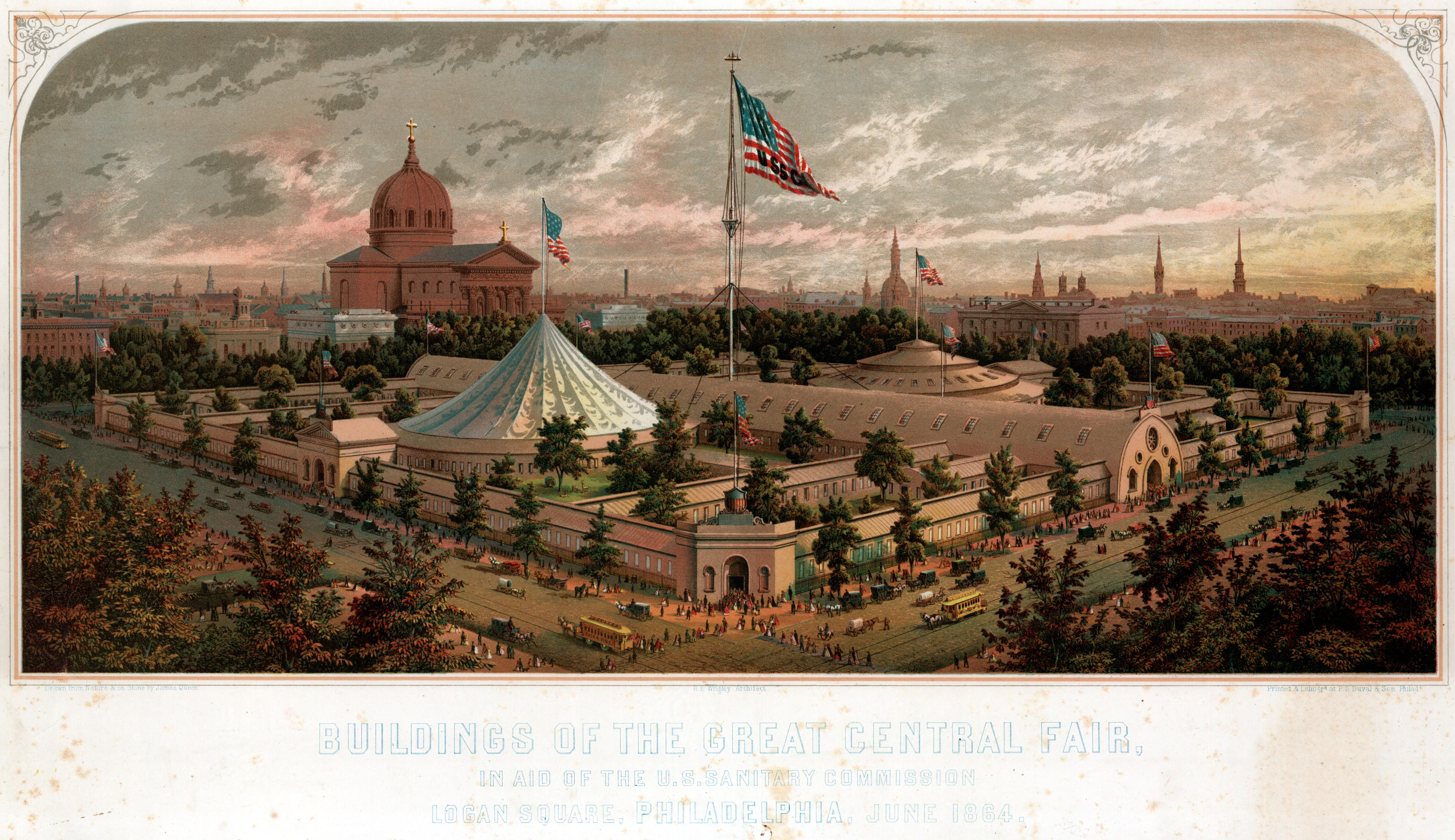
Great Central Fair, Philadelphia, 1864

The Great Central Fair occurred in June 1864 in Philadelphia, Pennsylvania. It raised over $1 million. Visitors included Abraham Lincoln and his family.

== Indianapolis, 1864 ==
A "Sanitary Bazaar" was held in Indianapolis as part of the Indiana State Fair in October 1864. Upon the announcement of the fair, Lucinda Burbank Morton (wife of Indiana's Republican Governor, Oliver P. Morton) published an appeal, calling for "patriotic" women in Indiana to contribute money and items to the fair. The Bazaar was held in a large building where items such as captured Confederate flags and items that once belonged to George Washington (such as clothing and a sword) were displayed. The building also featured an auditorium where local entertainers played, including a theater troupe that put on a well-received production of Edward Bulwer-Lytton's Money. A circus also played for the benefit of the fair. Vanderburgh County and Union County were awarded banners for their notably large contributions to the fair.

== Chicago, 1865 ==
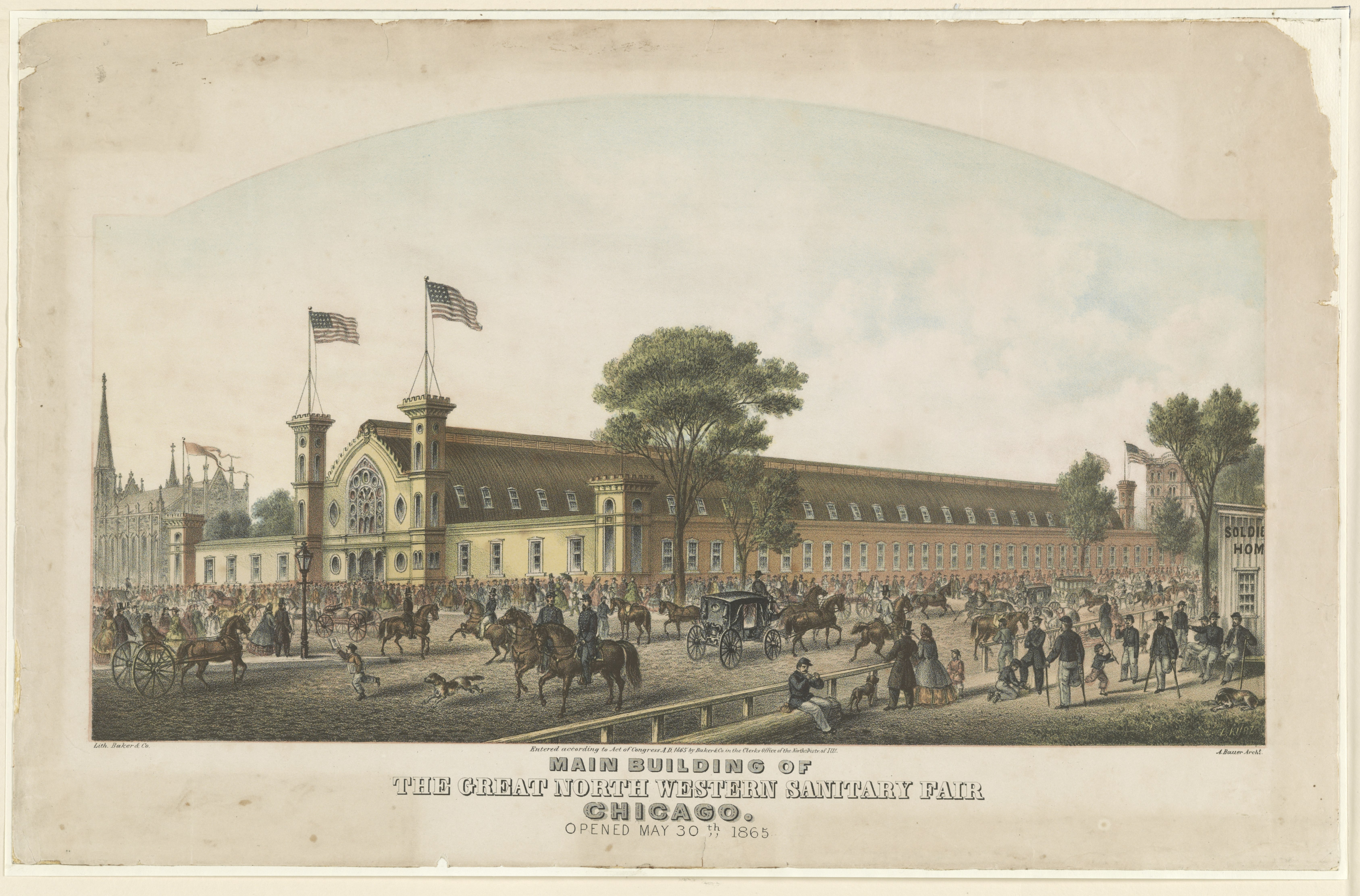
North Western Sanitary Fair, Chicago, 1865

Chicago held a second sanitary fair, the Great Northwestern Sanitary Fair, from April 27, 1865 to June 21, 1865. The women organizers published a newspaper entitled Voice of the Fair that was distributed at the event. Martia L. Davis Berry raised supplies for the Northwestern Sanitary Fair (Chicago, 1865), receiving medal No. 15 for her services The last of the great Sanitary Fairs was held in Chicago in June 1865 and John Carbutt was there to photograph the interior and exterior of the second Northwestern Soldiers Fair. The Illinois soldiers' homes at Chicago and Cairo, Illinois required continued funding, and the fair helped cover other continuing expenses of the Northwestern Sanitary Commission.

== Notable people ==
- Austin Adams, Sanitary Fair, Dubuque, Iowa, 1864
- George Bancroft, Soldiers' and Sailors' Sanitary Fair, Baltimore
- William Tilden Blodgett, Metropolitan Fair, New York City 1864
- Sarah Broadhead, Sanitary Fairs in the Pennsylvania area
- Thomas Barbour Bryan, Northwestern Sanitary Fair, Chicago, 1865
- Simon G. Elliott, Sanitary Fair, Philadelphia, 1864
- Rebecca Naylor Hazard, Great Western Sanitary Fair, St. Louis, 1864
- Martha J. Lamb, Sanitary Fair, Chicago, 1863
- Edward A. Lambert, Metropolitan Fair, New York City 1864
- Sara Jane Lippincott, Metropolitan Fair, New York City 1864
- Mary Livermore, North Western Sanitary Fair, 1863
- Fitz Hugh Ludlow, Metropolitan Fair, New York City 1864
- Frederick Law Olmsted, Metropolitan Fair, New York City, 1864
- William Rosecrans, Cincinnati Sanitary Fair, 1863
- J. T. Wamelink, composer, Sanitary Fair Grand March, 1864
- John Welsh, Sanitary Fair, Philadelphia, 1864

== Gallery ==
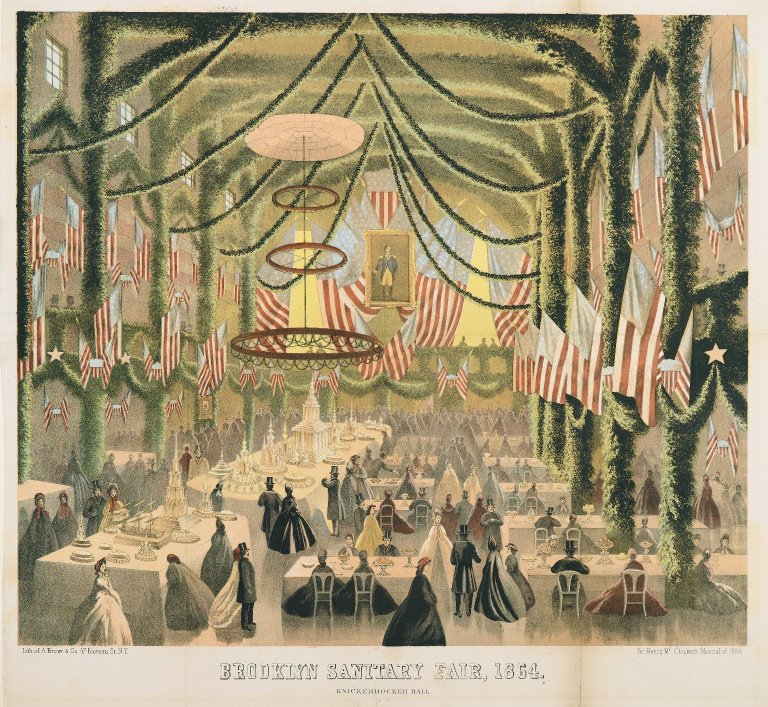
Brooklyn Sanitary Fair, 1864

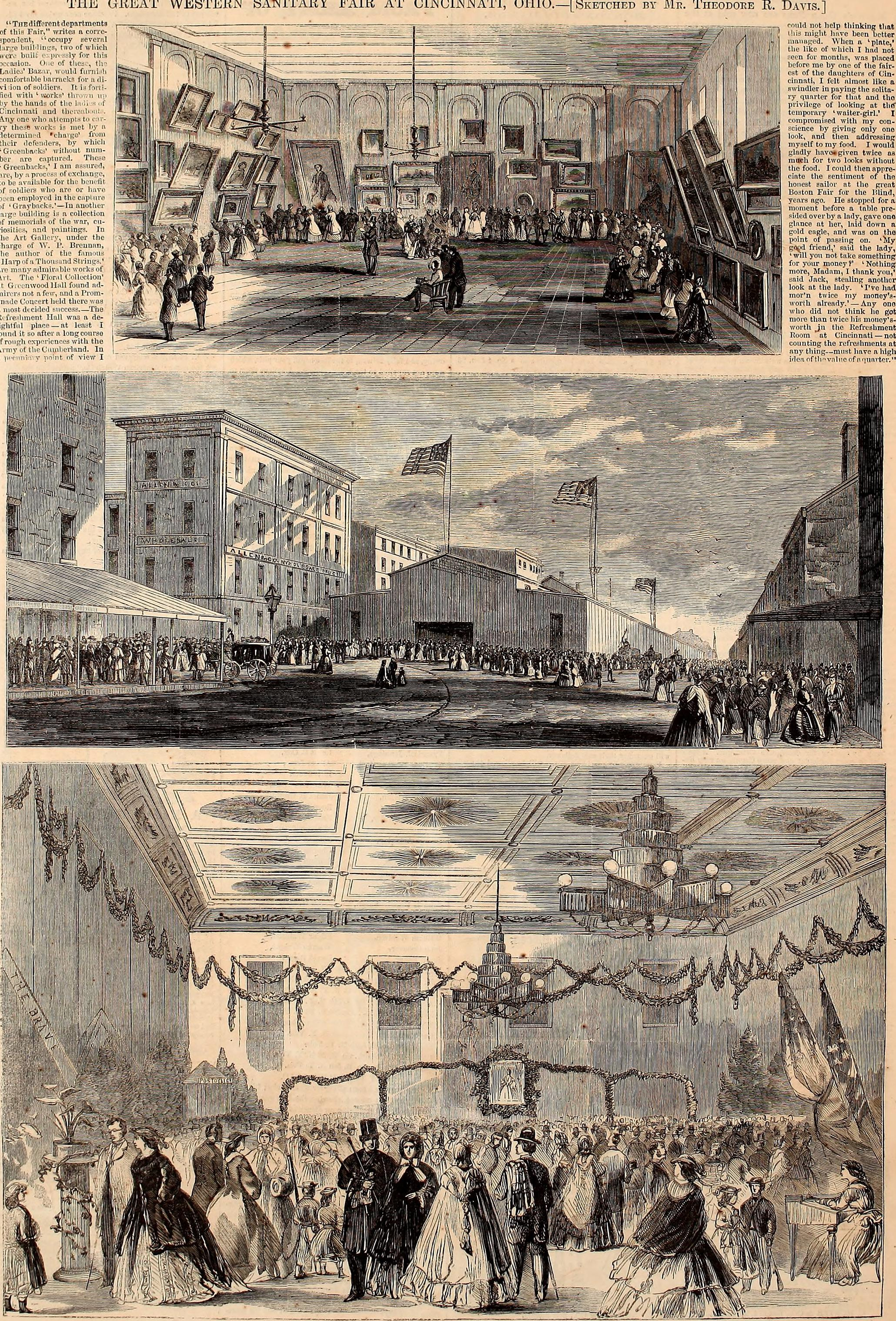
Great Western Sanitary Fair, Cincinnati, Ohio, 1864

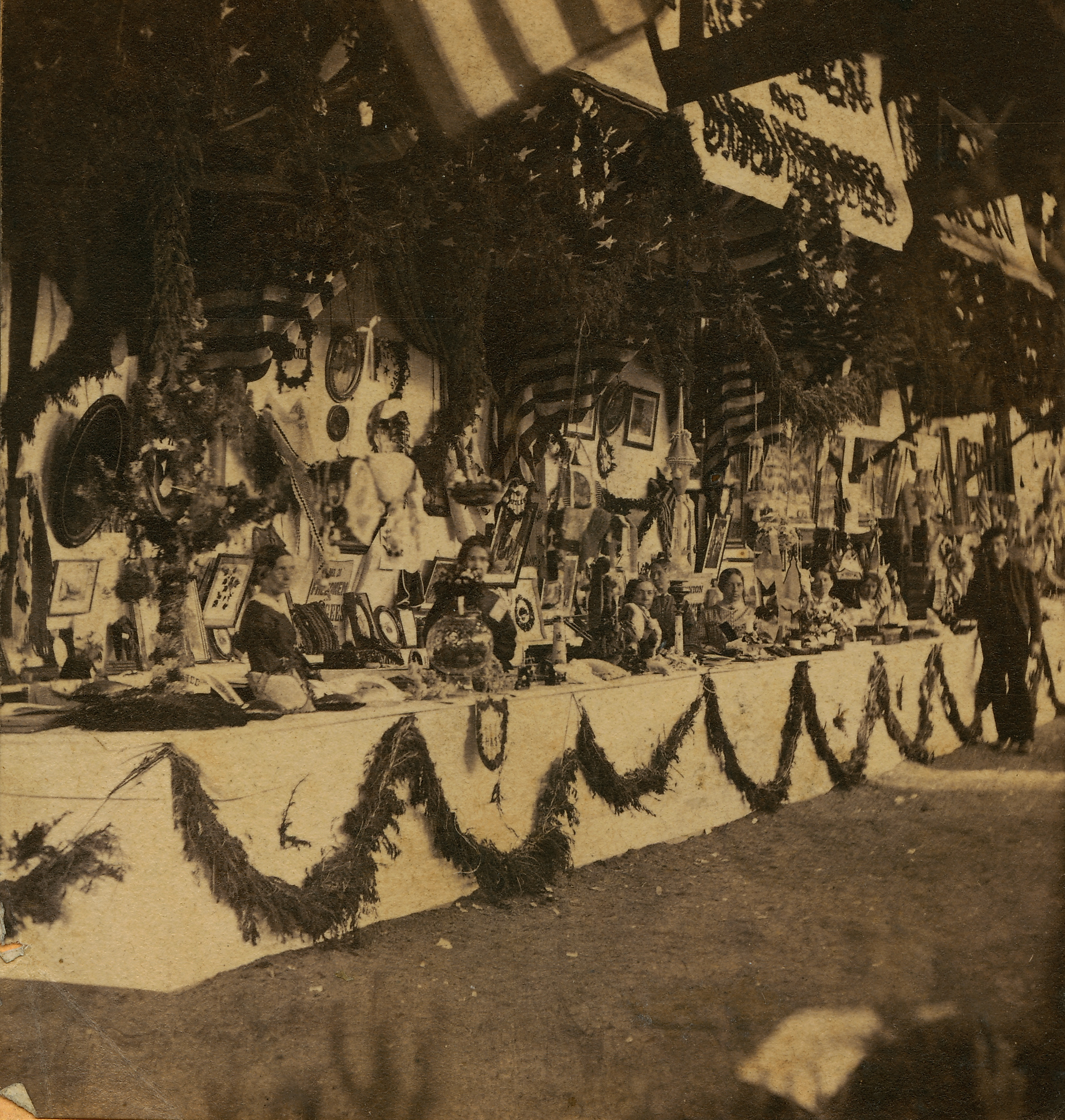
Mississippi Valley Sanitary Fair, St. Louis, Missouri, 1864

Poughkeepsie Sanitary Fair, 1864

Northern Ohio Sanitary Fair, Cleveland, 1864
