= Metropolitan Fair =

American Civil War fundraising event

The Metropolitan Fair
- Date: April 4–23, 1864
- Venue: Twenty Second Regiment Armory
- Location: 643 Park Ave, New York, NY, USA; 40.7675°N 73.9661°W
- Type: Fair
- Cause: Civil War
- Motive: Raise funds and supplies for the Union Army
- Target: American Citizens
- Organised by: United States Sanitary Commission
- Outcome: $1,340,050.37

The Metropolitan Fair was a public event organized in the Metropolitan City of New York by the United States Sanitary Commission to raise funds and supplies for the Union Army during the American Civil War (from 1861 to 1865). The first Metropolitan Fair was announced by The New York Times on January 1, 1864, to be held on March 28 of that year. However, the event was postponed until April 4, and it resulted in the largest Sanitary Fair ever which raised over a million dollars for the Union cause.

== Sanitary Fair's history ==
Henry Whitney Bellows-President of Sanitary Commission

In November 1863 the president of the United States Sanitary Commission, Dr. Henry Whitney Bellows, wrote on a paper called "Rough Hints" the main principles that needed to be applied to hold a fair in New York. It stated:

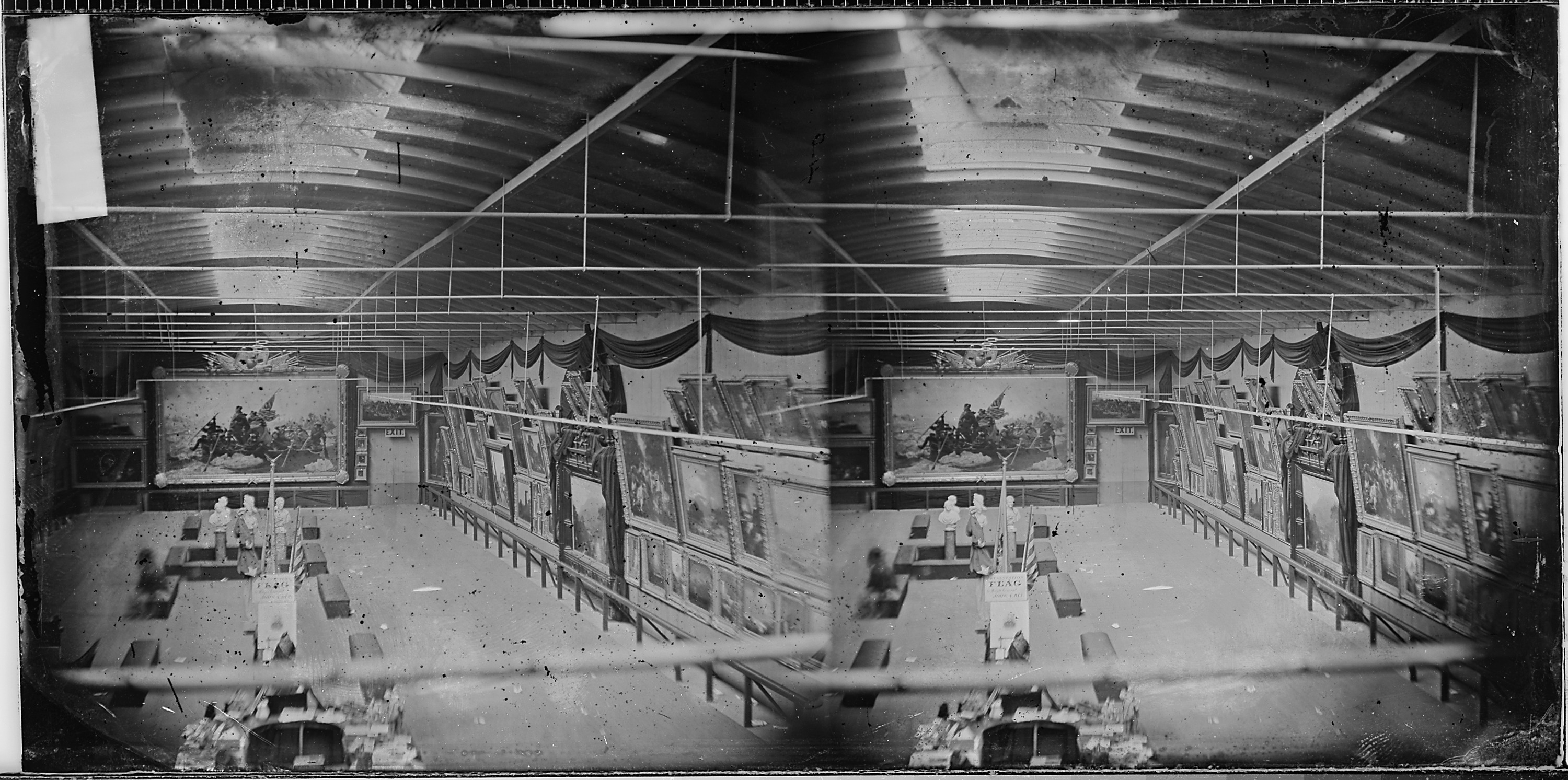
View in Santary Fair, N.Y.C. Metropolitan Fair Building - NARA - 526151

To be Metropolitan, the Fair must be:

1. On a National scale — its magnitude and results worthy of the occasion, the place, and the necessity.
2. It must be universal. Enlisting all sympathies from the highest to the lowest; democratic, without being vulgar; elegant, without being exclusive; fashionable, without being frivolous; popular, without being mediocre. In short, it must be inspired from the higher classes but animate, include, and win the sympathies and interest of all classes.

To accomplish this, it must be diversified, various, many-sided: everybody must can do and buy something. It is important to gratify the sober and to please the gay, to meet the views and approbation of the serious and utilitarian, while catching the eyes, the tastes, and the proclivities of the young, the light-hearted, the thoughtless, and the frivolous. It must have the support of our good people, our rich people, our fashionable people, our politicians, our civic fathers, our clergy, Chamber of Commerce, police, fire department, trades-unions, and all the great industrial establishments.

These suggestions were accepted during a meeting between approximately fifty or sixty ladies, held at the Union League Club House, on November 21, 1863. They started to work on the project and elected an Executive Board consisting of twenty-five ladies, who acted in connection with an Advisory Committee of twenty-five gentlemen, appointed by the Sanitary Committee on December 11. A prospectus was made and different committees were appointed to represent, to invite through advertisements and letters, and to collect contributions from trade and business interests in New York. The Twenty Second Regiment Armory, a square building of two hundred feet, was chosen to be the site of the Fair, but because of the great amplitude of the growing Fair, other buildings were put up in front of the Armory, on Fourteenth and Fifteenth Street, in the Union Square and on Broadway Avenue and Fourth Avenue thanks to the Building Committee and the faith and hard work of some Ladies.

The Mayor of the city, Charles Godfrey Gunther, on April 2, in view of the important occasion arisen from the humanitarian labor of love of charity associations, had issued a proclamation recommending that the opening day of the Fair had to be considered as holiday. Major-General John Adams Dix had organized the largest military display of New York, with all the regular troops of the city, under command of General Stannard, and the militia under General Sandford.

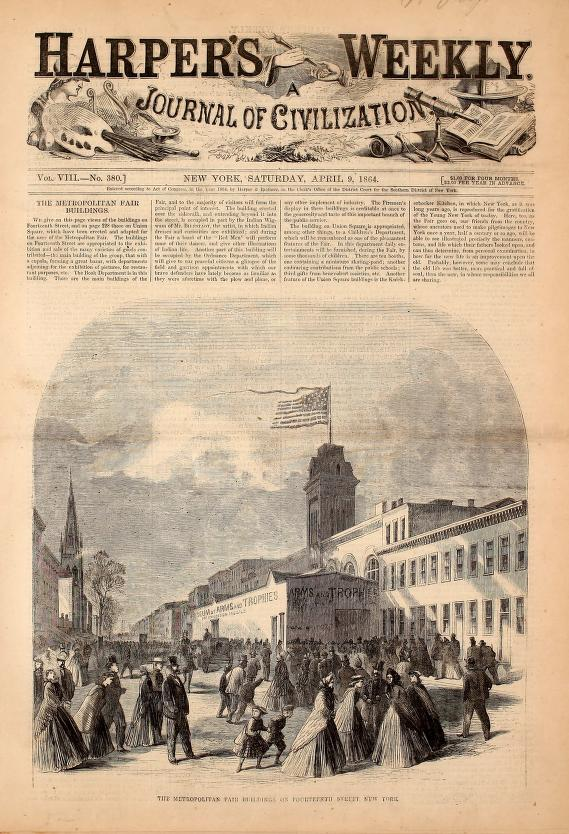
The Metropolitan Fair Building on Fourteenth-Street New York

Monday, April 4, 1864, the Metropolitan Fair was officially declared open. There were flags everywhere and the streets, starting from twelve o'clock, were filled by half million of gazing people. At three o'clock, one hour late than the original plan, eight thousand men, accompanied by the melodies of bands, started to march from Fourteenth Street, passing down Second Avenue, through Stuyvesant Place and Astor Place, to Broadway. Then the two mile procession stopped at the City Hall and the ceremony went on with two interesting speeches.

In the evening, in the gallery over the entrance of the Fair's building on Fourteenth street, the ceremonies were opened by a choir and a military band that played "Star Spangled Banner" and then the solemn Holmes' "Army Hymn" to express the spirit that carried out Americans during the war and gave a prompt to the organization of the Fair. After that General Dix spoke in behalf of the Gentlemen's Executive Committee and ended his speech by thanking the Ladies with the following words:

"To your hands, ladies, we commit these contributions from both hemispheres, to be disposed of under your auspices. And you may rest assured that the sources of consolation and comfort which you are opening for others, will be poured out in kindred currents of gratitude to you, to bless you with the highest and purest of all gratifications, — that of alleviating the condition of those who are suffering for a cause involving in its issue every element of civilization and of social order."

To this it followed a long applause and Handel's "Hallelujah Chorus" and then the last speech was given by Mr. Joseph Hodges Choate in behalf of the Ladies' Committee. Finally, after singing "Old Hundred" the crowd melted itself through the Picture Gallery, the Arms and Trophies Room, the Indian Department, the Curiosity Shop and the Restaurant. So that day the Fair was inaugurated and lasted eighteen days, until Saturday the 23rd of April.

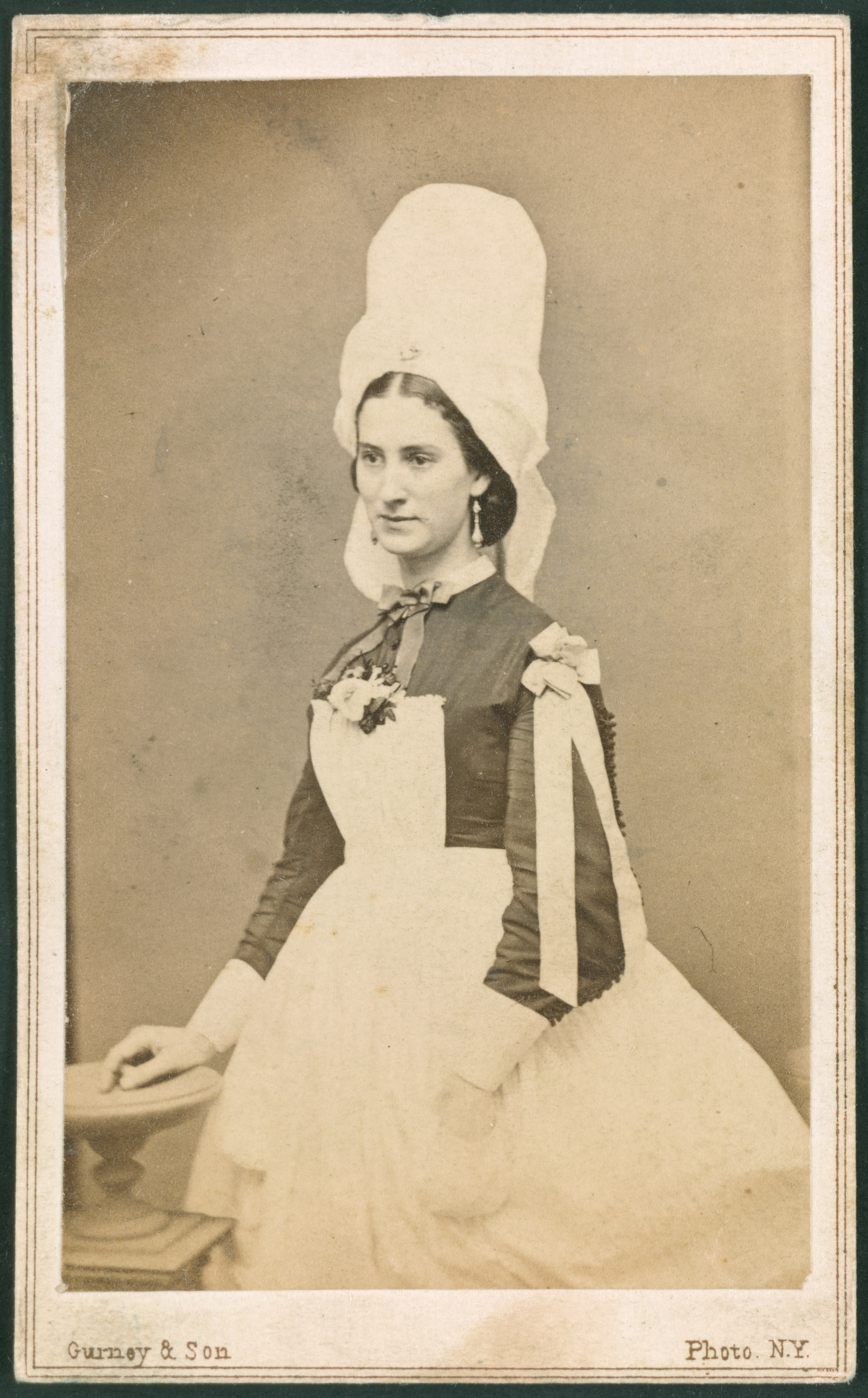
Costume of ladies' at the Normandy stand, Metropolitan Fair, April 1864

== Fair's buildings ==
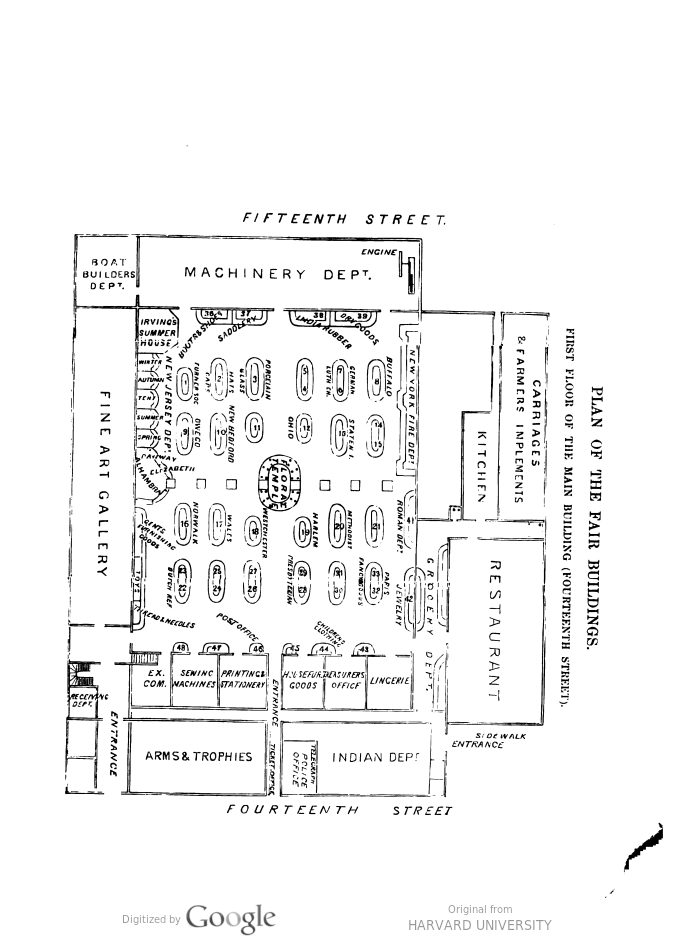
Metropolitan Fair's buildings in Fourteenth Street (first floor)

The first possible location for the Metropolitan Fair was to hire the Academy of Music and Iring Hall but these buildings didn't have enough rooms. In a second moment, there was the idea of using the building then unfinished, bounded by Broadway, Sixth Avenue, and Thirty-Fifth and Thirty-Sixth Streets, in conjunction with the State Arsenal, Seventh Avenue and Thirty-Fifth Street, some vacant lots in Thirty-Fourth Street, and the house at the corner of Fifth Avenue and Thirty-Fourth Street, last used by the Spingler Institute. The offer of the use of the Twenty Second Regiment Armory was accepted.

On April 9, 1864, Harper's Weekly published views of buildings on 14th Street and at Union Square. They were built and adapted for use of the Metropolitan Fair. The Fourteenth Street building consisted of the brick Armory buildings near Sixth Avenue, with wooden structures added thereto, affording a front of more than two hundred feet, and not only extending through from Fourteenth to Fifteenth streets, but including the north sidewalk on the lower street, and on the upper leaving room for the passage of only a single carriage. At fourteenth Street there were the main buildings of the Fair - with a dome, forming a large bazaar, with adjacent sections used for exhibition of paintings and similar adoptions. Previously described main buildings were the main focus because of The Book Department inside.

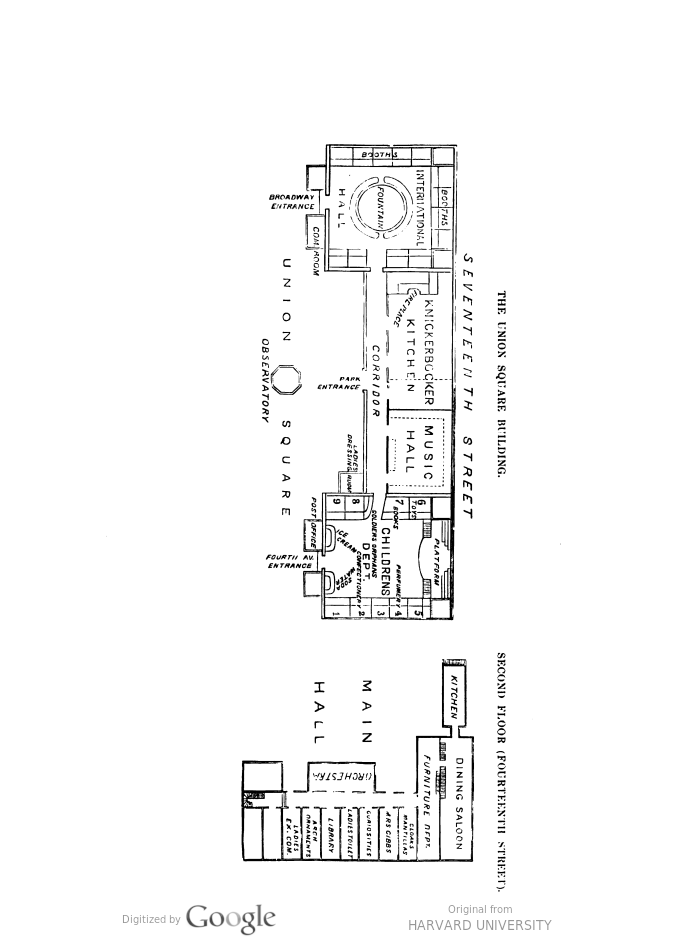
Metropolitan Fair's buildings in Union Square and second floor of the building in Fourteenth Street

In front of the Armory, the building was raised above the pavement and extended to the street. It was occupied by the Indian Wigwam, which displayed Indian costumes and depicted Indian life. "Red People" performed some of their traditional dances inside. During the Fair, there were many similar performances that were supposed to make time pleasant. The lower part of the building housed the Department of Ordnance, referring to the public service and the Museum of Arms and Trophies. The street front of the Fair was extended by incorporating a building occupied by the livery stable, and a building of three divisions designated for the Fair Restaurant. The Department of Machinery, a house, a shop with three other full parts were placed at Fifteenth Street.

Temporary buildings on the fourteenth and fifteenth street cost more than sixty thousand dollars, although it was needed more space. The Sanitary Commission, in line with the idea to allow children to have an active role in the fair, agreed to be responsible for the additional buildings, and the organizers gained permission to use part of Union Square.

The building in Union Square, though divided into four departments, was two hundred and eighty-five feet long, and consisted of two main buildings, each sixty by ninety feet, connected by a narrower one of one hundred and sixty-five feet in length and fifty-five feet wide. There was located the Children's Department. It was divided into ten booths which contained among other things, a miniature pond for skating and the embracing contribution from public schools. Union Square cost $17,000, was symmetrical, consisted of two main buildings, one on Broadway and one on Fourth Avenue. It housed also three other departmental fairs - International Department, Knickerbocker's Kitchen and Music Hall. At the construction of the building, bricklayers and fitters took part and due to the role of the building, performed their work at half the standard price of services. The entire construction lasted a little over two weeks.

== Financial statement ==
The financial statement of the Metropolitan Fair reported that the whole amount received by the Treasury of the Fair up to 1 August 1864, date of the report of the treasurer, was One Million Three Hundred and Forty Thousand Fifty Dollars and Thirty Seven Cents ($1,340,050.37). Moreover, the Financial Statement reports that the amount paid out for expenses was One Hundred Sixty Three Thousands Three Hundred and Seventy Eight Dollars and Forty Seven Cents ($163,378.47), leaving as the net profit of the Fair the sum of One Million One Hundred and Seventy Six Thousands Six Hundred and Seventy One Dollars and Ninety Cent ($1,176,671.90). As economic contributions continued to be donated and as further goods deliveries were expected and as many items remained unsold, the accounts of the Treasurer couldn't be closed on that day (1 August 1864), and a final statement showed the sum added to the sum they had already received. Of that sum, one million dollars was paid to the Treasurer of the United States Sanitary Commission, on the 17th May, 1864, by order of the Executive Committee. The role of chairman of the Financial Committee was superintended by John Hamilton Gourlie, whereas Hamilton Wills and George Tuthill held the role of assistants of the Chairman. All the remaining goods at the end of the Fair were either sold at auction, or sent as gifts to other fairs in St. Louis and Philadelphia.

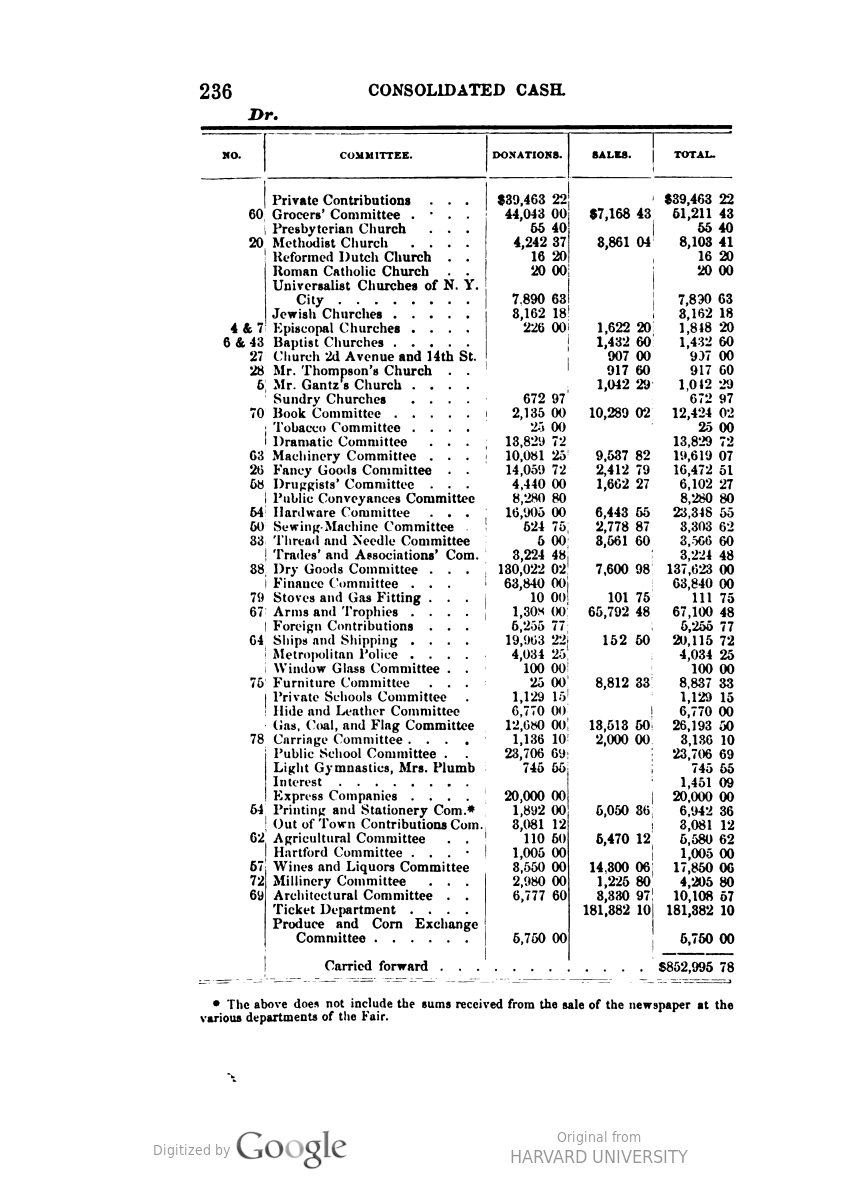
Financial Summary of Metropolitan Fair

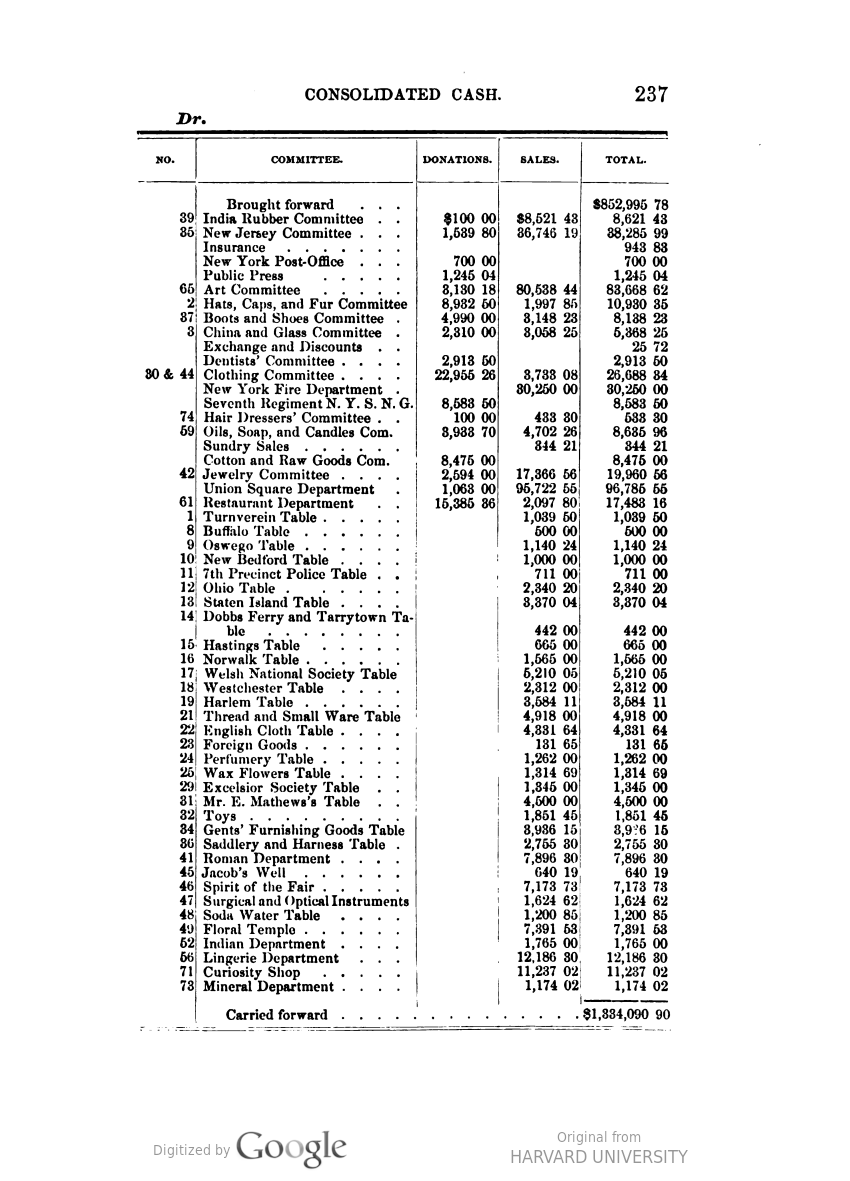
Financial Summary of Metropolitan Fair

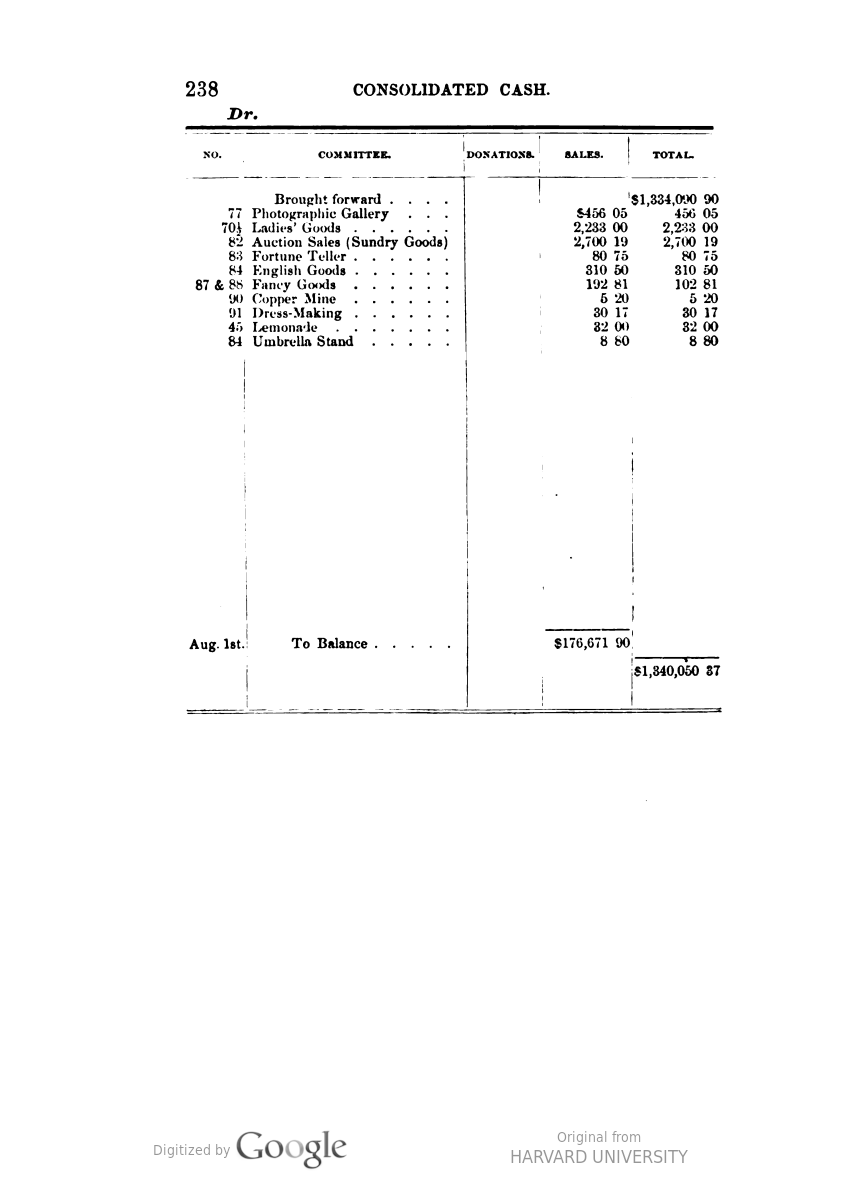
Financial Summary of Metropolitan Fair

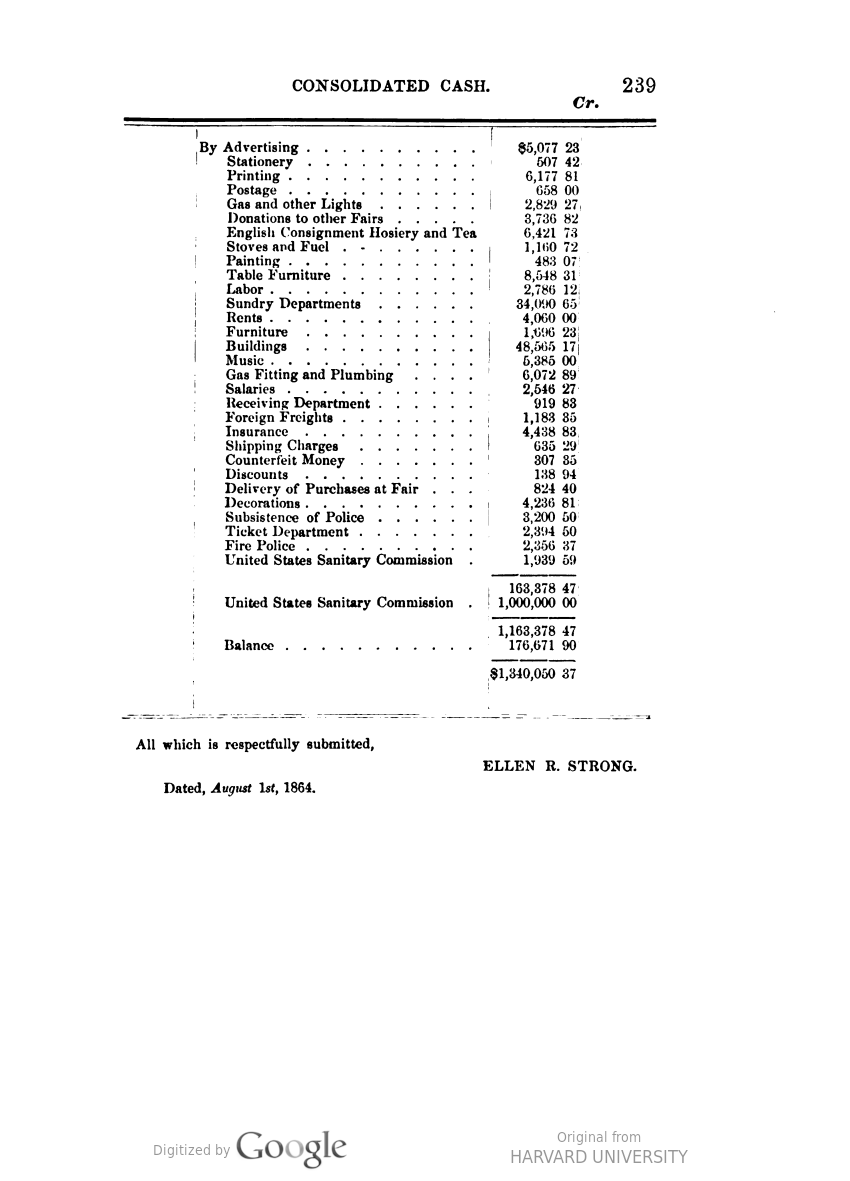
Financial Summary of Metropolitan Fair

== Special committees ==
The list of used committees which were supposed to share every branch of agriculture, industry and art to collect products for exhibition and sale.

== See also ==
- United States Sanitary Commission
