= Voice of the Fair =

Voice of the Fair was a newspaper published by the women who organized the Great Northwestern Sanitary Fair for the Sanitary Commission, which was held in Chicago from May 30 to June 24, 1865. The first issue was issued on April 27, with the recent news of President Lincoln's assassination given a notable place on the front page. This sanitary fair newspaper was printed by Round and James of 46 State Street (modern day 174 N. State Street).
