= George Templeton Strong =

American diarist (1820–1875)

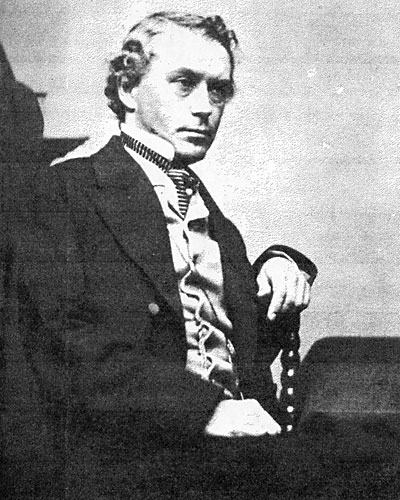
- George Templeton Strong c. 1870
- Born: January 26, 1820; New York City, U.S.
- Died: July 21, 1875 (aged 55); New York City, U.S.
- Education: Columbia College
- Occupation: Lawyer
- Notable work: The Diary of George Templeton Strong

George Templeton Strong (January 26, 1820 – July 21, 1875) was an American lawyer, musician and diarist. His 2,250-page diary, discovered in the 1930s, provides a striking personal account of life in the 19th century, especially during the events of the American Civil War. It covers 1835 to 1875. The historian Paula Baker described him as "perhaps the northern equivalent of South Carolina's Mary Chesnut: quotable, opinionated, and a careful follower of events." He was a well-placed civic leader who was very well known in New York City. He served with distinction on the United States Sanitary Commission during the Civil War, but never occupied any significant civic positions and had no special influence.

== Life and career ==
Strong was born at 50 Franklin Street, New York City, on January 26, 1820. He lived to write intimately of the turbulent years leading up to and through the American Civil War, as well as the corrupt and turbulent years in New York following the war.

Strong received his early education from Columbia Grammar & Preparatory School (then known as Columbia Grammar School). In 1838 he graduated from Columbia College with high honors and served as president of the Philolexian Society. That same year he joined the law practice of his father, a business that afterwards became Cadwalader, Wickersham & Taft. Until its recent merger, it was the nation's oldest operating law firm. On May 15, 1848, Strong married Ellen Ruggles in Grace Church, New York. A gifted amateur singer, she was the daughter of Samuel B. Ruggles. They went on to have three children together. The family was musical, and both Strong and his wife performed as amateurs. He served as president of the New York Philharmonic Society for several years. Their son, also named George Templeton Strong (1856–1948), became a noted Romantic composer and painter. Estranged from his father at an early age, the younger Strong moved to Switzerland in the late nineteenth century and did most of his work while living in Europe, but he is nevertheless generally considered to be an American artist.

In 1853, Strong was elected a trustee of Columbia College. He served for many years as a vestryman at the prominent Episcopal Trinity Church on Wall Street. He helped found the United States Sanitary Commission, which helped ameliorate the sufferings of wounded soldiers during the American Civil War. He was also treasurer and member of its executive committee throughout the war. In addition, he helped to start the Union League Club of New York, an organization which pledged to "cultivate a profound national devotion." The organization provided a means to reconciling the whites and blacks of the South into the Republican Party. Strong funded a Union Army regiment during the war, and Ellen Strong served on a hospital ship. He avoided military service by taking advantage of that section of the Enrollment Act of 1863 allowing draftees to pay $300 to a substitute who served for them. This amount, a healthy sum in 1863, did not long remain the norm, for George Templeton Strong, pluckier than many of his contemporaries, paid a "big 'Dutch' boy of about twenty" $1,100 to be his "alter ego" in 1864.

Strong's 2,250-page diary, now in the collections of the New-York Historical Society, was discovered in the 1930s. Beginning on October 5, 1835, when he was fifteen, Strong wrote almost every day of his life for nearly forty years. Excerpts from his diary are featured in Ken Burns's 1990 documentary The Civil War and in Ric Burns's New York: A Documentary Film, read by writer George Plimpton. Extensive selections from the diary were published in four volumes in 1952, and remain of interest to historians of New York City, as well as to bibliographic collectors. In January 2026, a new one-volume annotated edition focused on the Civil War-period entries of the diary was published by the Library of America.

Strong died in 1875.
