= Martia L. Davis Berry =

American political reformer (1844–1894)

Martia L. Berry
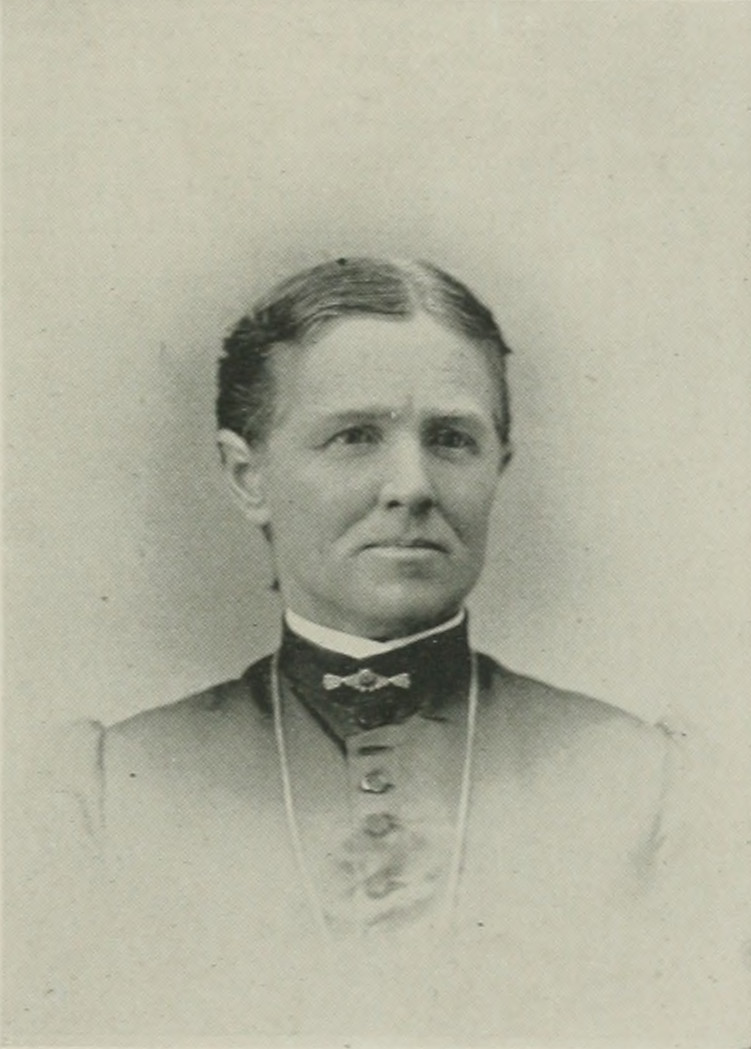
- "A Woman of the Century"
- Born: Martia L. Davis; January 22, 1844; Portland, Michigan, U.S.
- Died: January 13, 1894 (aged 49); Cawker City, Kansas, U.S.
- Resting place: Prairie Grove Cemetery, Cawker city
- Occupation: social reformer

Martia L. Davis Berry (née, Davis; January 22, 1844 – January 13, 1894) was a 19th-century American social reformer. From her childhood, she took for her life motto and work, "God and home and native land" in whatever opportunities might be available to her. She organized the first Woman's Foreign Missionary Society of the Methodist Episcopal Church west of the Missouri River and the first woman's Club in Cawker City, Kansas. She served as State treasurer of the Kansas Equal Suffrage Association and president of the sixth district of the Kansas Woman's Christian Temperance Union (WCTU).

== Early life and education ==
Martia L. Davis was born in Portland, Michigan, January 22, 1844. Her parents were born in New York State. Her father was of Irish and Italian descent. He was a firm believer in human rights, an earnest anti-slavery man and a strong prohibitionist. Her mother was of German descent, a woman far in advance of her times.

Berry wanted to be a school teacher, and to that end she received her education.

== Career ==
She began to teach when she was seventeen years of age and taught five years in the public schools of her native town.

At the close of the civil war, she married John S. Berry, a soldier who had given to his country four years of service. Seeking broader fields for the careers, they came to Kansas with their only child, Alice, taking a homestead in Glen Elder Township, Mitchell County, Kansas, September 21, 1871, where Martia taught in the sod schoolhouse and rode over the large district of the Methodist Episcopal Church, collecting, in the capacity of steward. In 1872, they moved to Cawker.

In Cawker, she opened its first millinery store, also doing business in general merchandise for twelve years. She was elected Superintendent of the M. E. Sabbath School, and held the office until her death with but a short break in service. During eight years, she was a steward of the church.

After her husband removed to another State, Verry continued to connect herself with public spirited works, both state and local, leaving her mark on everything that tended to make Cawker prosperous. For example, the city's public library was built by the people under supervision of the Woman's Hesperian Library Club, of which club Berry was the founder.

To support the work of Christian missionaries, Berry organized the first Woman's Foreign Missionary Society of the Methodist Episcopal Church west of the Missouri River, in April 1872. The idea of the Woman's Club in her town originated with her and the club was organized November 15, 1883. It is a monument to the literary taste and business ability of its founders.

"Taxation with representation" aroused her spirit, even in childhood, and till her death, she was an ardent equal suffragist, take great interest herself and for other women in Cawker and school government. On October 29, 1885, she was elected to the office of State treasurer of the Kansas Equal Suffrage Association, to which office she was subsequently re-elected. She attended the suffrage convention in Lincoln, Kansas, October, 1886.

Berry formed the first temperance society in Cawker. On April 14, 1887, she became the president of the sixth district of the Kansas WCTU. On February 28, 1889, she was elected to the office of treasurer of the Kansas WCTU, and her yearly re-election proved her faithfulness. Berry held a WCTU district convention in Lincoln, Kansas, August 1890.

== Later life and death ==
Being fond of fine stock horses, she drove a spirited team, when the reins bruised her right hand causing an abscess, early June 1893, which deprived her of the use of her hand. A fever following the abscess, which hardly healed when another formed on the liver. A surgical operation was performed November 6, 1893, and the results were encouraging. But the infection spread to her brain, filling her last days with excruciating pain. Hoping to be conscious to the end, for some hours after speech failed, she signaled for all to sing.

Martia L. Davis Berry died in Cawker City, January 13, 1894. She was buried in that city's Prairie Grove Cemetery.

== Awards and honors ==
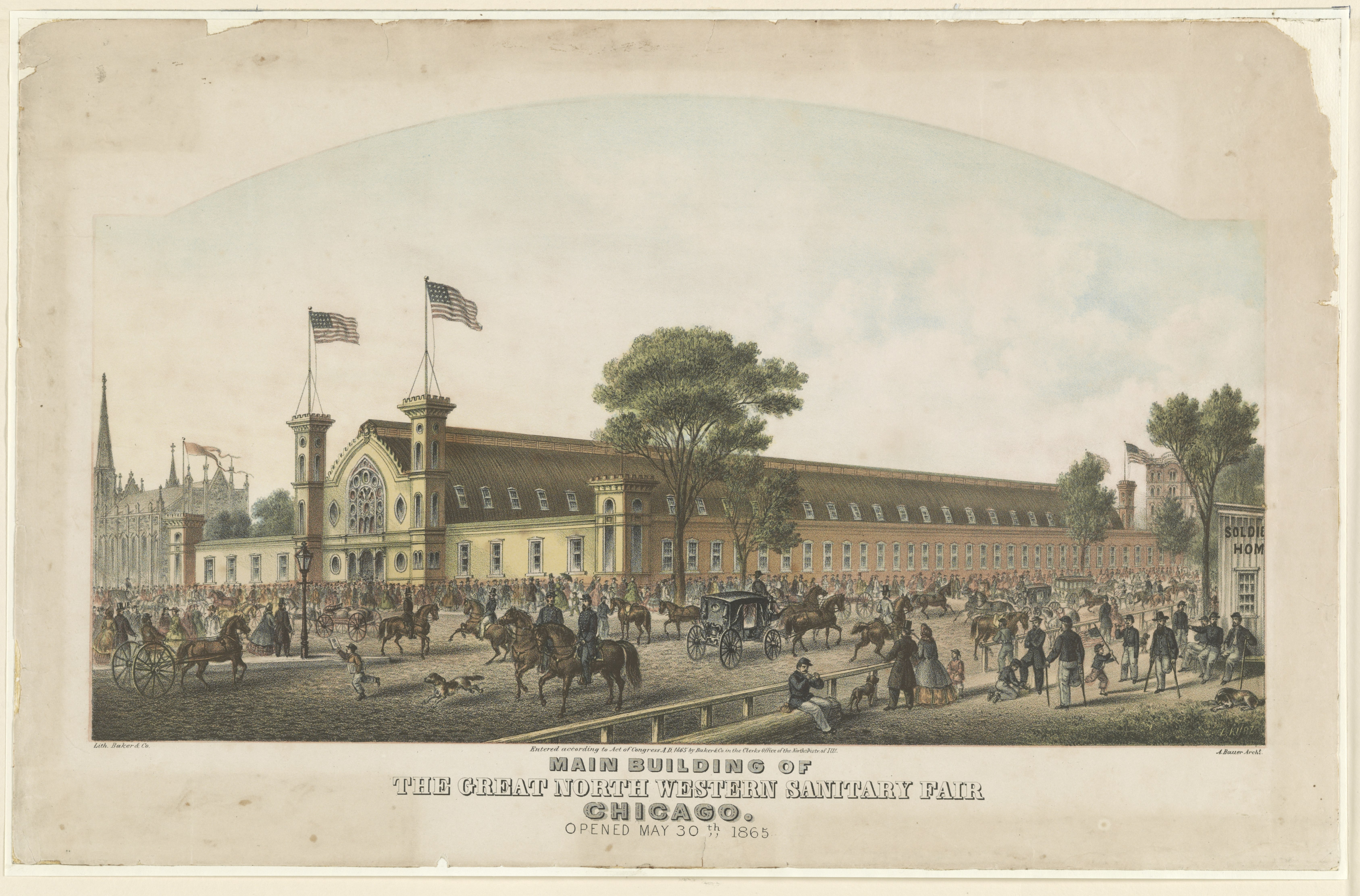
Great Northwestern Sanitary Fair (Chicago, 1865)

Berry was one of the prominent persons who raised supplies for the United States Sanitary Commission's Great Northwestern Sanitary Fair (Chicago, 1865), receiving medal No. 15 for her services.
