= J. T. Wamelink =

Joannes Theodorus Wamelink (10 November 1827 in Aalten, Gelderland, the Netherlands – 31 December 1900), was a prominent musician and composer in Cleveland, Ohio.

== Emigration to Cleveland ==
In 1835, Wamelink and his family, father Hermanus Wamelink and mother Maria Johanna Francisca De Reuwer Wamelink emigrated to Cleveland, Ohio, with his eight siblings. Wamelink as a youth of fourteen, became the first organist of St. Mary of the Flats Catholic Church. When the superstructure of the cathedral was completed, a new organ was installed, which the Cleveland Herald of that time refers to as the finest in the district.

For a period, Wamelink moved to Pittsburgh, Pennsylvania and while there worked as a composer in conjunction with Charles B. Barr. In 1853 Wamelink married Catherine Sweetland, of Pittsburgh then returned with her to Cleveland, where he continued to work in music.

== Years in Cleveland, Ohio ==
Upon his return to Cleveland, Wamelink opened a piano shop on Superior St. He continued as a composer, music, and voice teacher, and for nearly 30 years was the organist at St. John's Cathedral in Cleveland. He was the founder of the Haydn Society; the first musical society in Cleveland and served as its director for many years. He died on 31 Dec 1900, and is interred in the St. John's Cemetery. The City of Cleveland named a street near University Circle after Wamelink.

== Musical Compositions ==
Wamelink composed many pieces of music, a number of which are found in the collections of: The Library of Congress, The Carnegie Library in Pittsburgh, Stanford University, the Rutherford B. Hayes Presidential Center, Washington State University, and the Penn Libraries, among others. His compositions include:

- First Mass in C, Ave Maria
- Central Skating Park Polka
- Skating Rink Waltz
- Sweetbrier Polka Mazurka, 1854
- Homewood Polka Mazurka, 1855
- O Sing That Melody Again, 1858
- The Queen Rose, 1859
- Col J. B. Clark's Return, 1862
- Sanitary Fair Grand March, 1864
- Liberty and Union, 1864
- Dying Soldier Boy, 1864
- Petroleum Is King, 1865
- Wild Bird's Song, 1865
- President Lincoln's Funeral March, 1865
- We'll March Once More, My Boys, 1872
- United, in 1874 Roses, 1874
- Col. Clark's Grand Triumphant March, 1875
- The Veterans of '76, 1876.
