= Simon G. Elliott =

American surveyor, cartographer, and railroad promoter

Simon G. Elliott (1828–1897) was an American surveyor, cartographer, and railroad promoter. He is credited with creating two important maps surveying the locations of remains on the Gettysburg and Antietam battlefields.

== Life and career ==
Simon Green Elliott was born in Pittsfield, New Hampshire on March 27, 1828. He was inspired by the Gold Rush to move to California in 1855. He began a career as a surveyor by 1856. Several years later, he successfully completed a survey of a proposed rail route between Nevada and Northern California for the Sacramento, Placer and Nevada Railroad Company, moving him toward the railroad industry. Perhaps related to this project, he produced at least one map of California, a view of "Central California: showing the different railroad lines completed & projected" published in 1860.

In 1863, he was appointed as the chief engineer of the California and Oregon Railroad Company. He was tasked with surveying a route for a track planned between Marysville, California and Portland, Oregon. After several months, however, he and his colleagues had run out of both time and funds. They quarrelled, and Elliott left the team to return south. He decided to travel east to present a claim to Congress and seek land grants and other aid for the project. He departed in late fall of 1863, and arrived in New York City on 18 January 1864. Elliott met with government officials in Washington, D.C., on multiple occasions throughout February 1864. Ultimately, however, he was unsuccessful: the railroad bill before Congress that would have provided funds for Elliott and his colleagues did not pass. During his time in Washington, he created his maps surveying the Antietam and Gettysburg battlefields.

Elliott remained on the East Coast through the following spring, when he married Cornelia Blanchard on March 7, 1865, in her hometown of Weymouth, Massachusetts. The following month, he returned to California, arriving in San Francisco on April 2, 1865. He seems to have travelled back and forth between California and Massachusetts for the next decade, and together he and Cornelia had four children.

He appears to have been undeterred by his failure to complete his survey of the planned California-Oregon rail line. Several years later, he embarked on a similar venture under the name of the Oregon Central Railroad Company of Salem; this attempted partnership crumbled under Elliott's financial mismanagement and possible fraud, and was taken over by Ben Holladay, who turned it into the Oregon and California Railroad Company.

By the mid-1870s, Elliott appears to have retired permanently to Massachusetts, where he died of heart disease on September 19, 1897.

== Battlefield maps ==
Elliott is remembered for his detailed maps of two Civil War battlefields. While in Washington in the spring of 1864, pursuing his case to Congress, he produced at least two detailed surveys of the Gettysburg and Antietam battlefields. While the full story of how he became involved in this project is unknown, it is likely that he was given access to original surveys of temporary burial sites undertaken by officials at the times of the battles (Gettysburg in July 1863, and Antietam in September 1862). His maps reflect and appear to draw heavily on the eyewitness work done by local officials and community members (such as David Wills of Gettysburg, who had commissioned a survey of burial locations within two weeks of the battle).

The Gettysburg map, published in 1864 by "S.G. Elliott," shows the location of 8,352 individual burial locations and 345 dead horses. However, it only identifies seventeen of the graves by name. The Antietam map shows 5,800 graves, including the names of 45 deceased soldiers (although it does include some minor errors). The increased detail for the latter map may be a result of the fact that, although the Battle of Antietam took place a year before Gettysburg, its dead were not interred in a permanent cemetery until 1864, after the publication of Elliott's map.

The maps were published by H.H. Lloyd, a New York publisher and bookseller, sometime in June 1864, and are known to have been sold at the 1864 Sanitary Fair in Philadelphia, as well as by H.H. Lloyd at their premises in New York. Few copies of the maps are known to survive today, but they have both been digitized (the Antietam map by the New York Public Library and the Gettysburg map by the Library of Congress). The American Battlefield Trust uses Elliott's map of Gettysburg to inform its conservation activities in the Gettysburg area.
