= Henry Whitney Bellows =

American clergyman and relief organizer

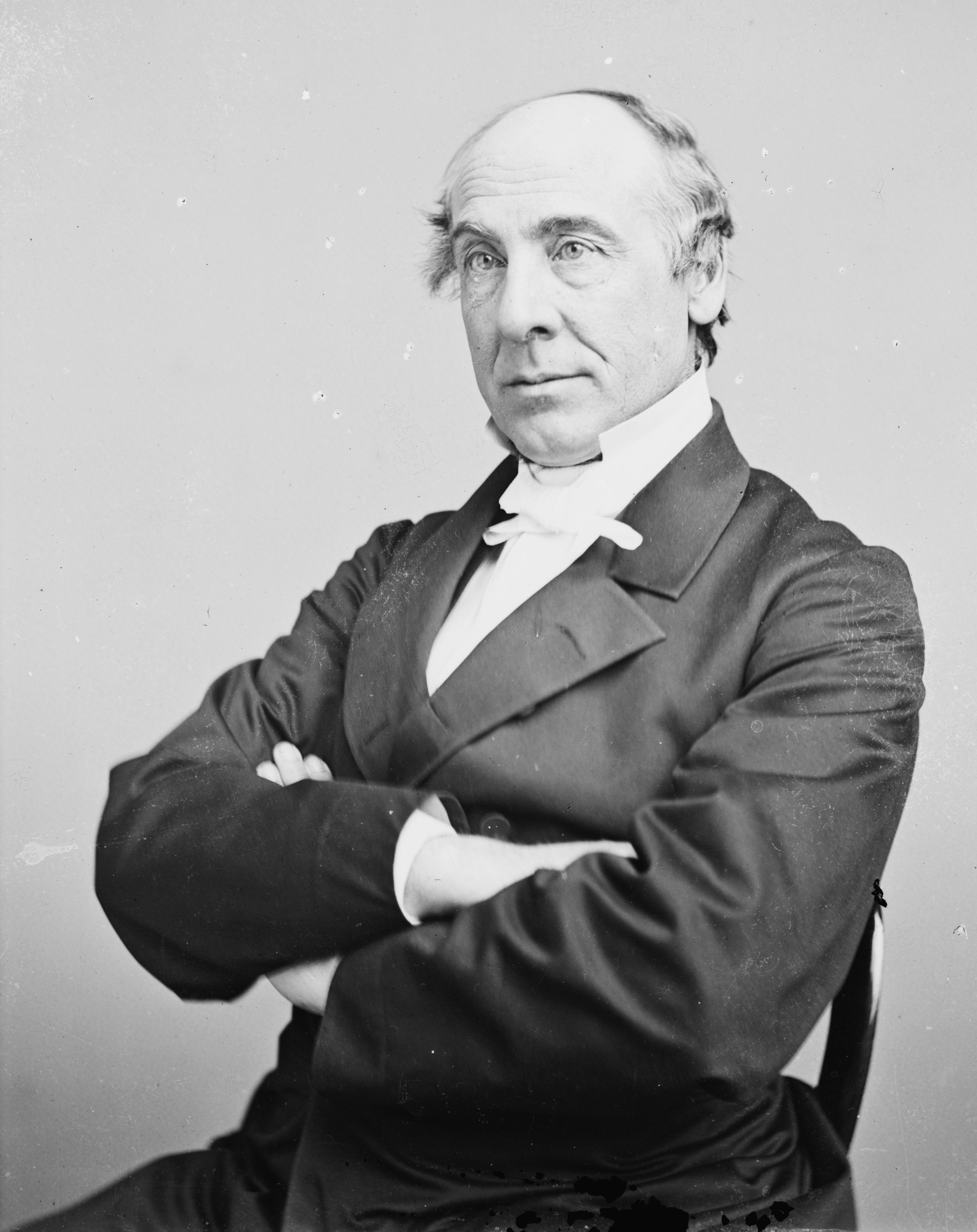
- Born: June 11, 1814; Boston, Massachusetts, U.S.
- Died: January 30, 1882 (aged 67); New York City, U.S.
- Occupation(s): Clergy, relief organizer
- Known for: United States Sanitary Commission

Henry Whitney Bellows (June 11, 1814 – January 30, 1882) was an American clergyman, and the planner and president of the United States Sanitary Commission, the leading soldiers' aid society, during the American Civil War. Under his leadership, the USSC became the largest and most effective organization dedicated to supporting the health and efficiency of the Union army.

== Life ==
Bellows was born in Boston, Massachusetts. He graduated at Harvard College in 1832, and at the Harvard Divinity School in 1837, held a brief pastorate (1837–1838) at Mobile, Alabama, and in 1839 became pastor of the First Congregational (Unitarian) church in New York City (afterwards the Unitarian Church of All Souls, in charge of which he remained until his death.

Here Bellows acquired a high reputation as a pulpit orator and lyceum lecturer, and was a recognized leader in the Unitarian Church in America. For many years after 1846 he edited The Christian Inquirer, a Unitarian weekly paper, and he was also for some time an editor of The Christian Examiner. Bellows was (somewhat) Trancendentilism. In 1849, he was elected into the National Academy of Design as an Honorary member. In 1857 he delivered a series of lectures in the Lowell Institute course, on The Treatment of Social Diseases.

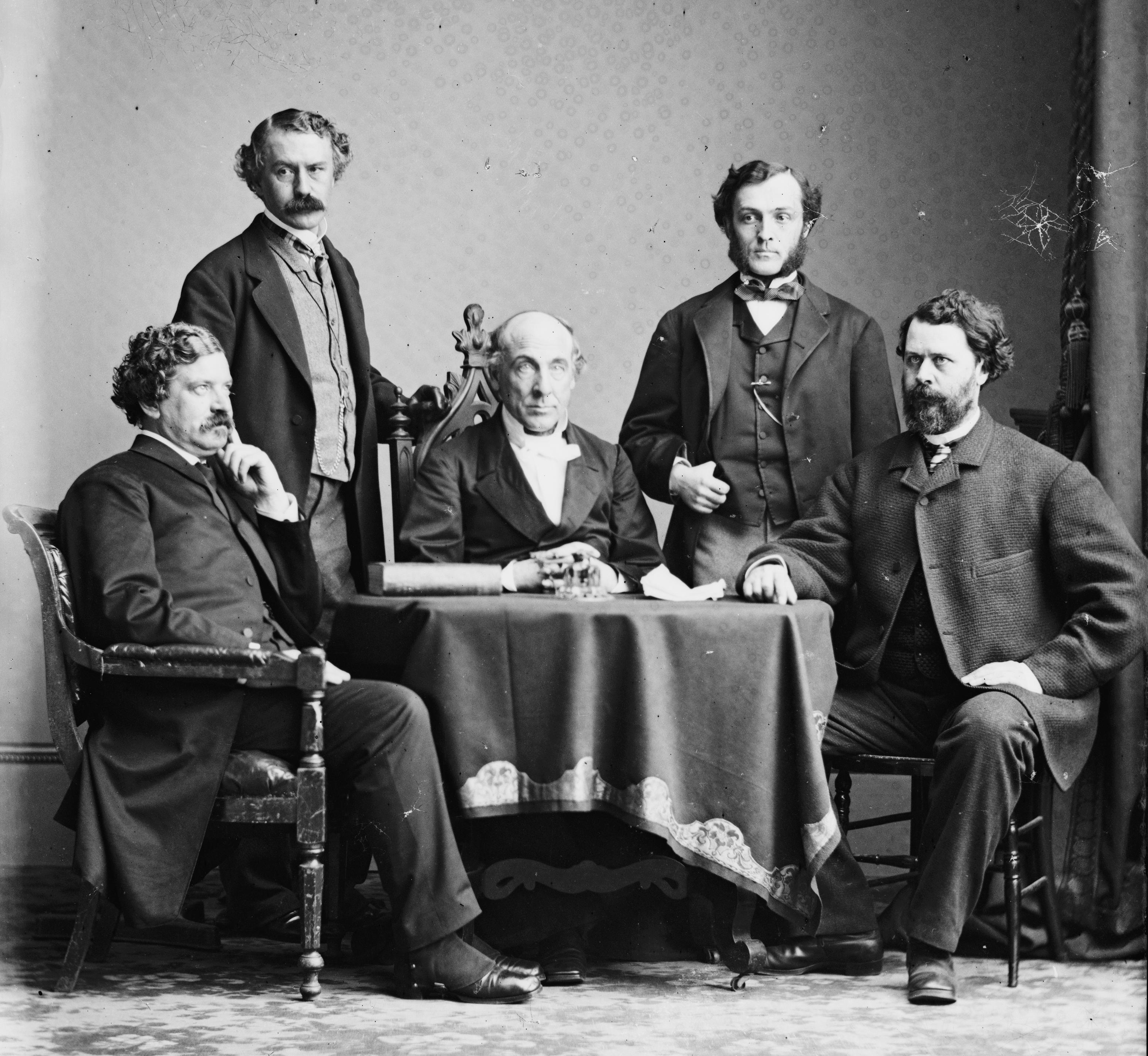
Picture from the Brady-Handy Collection misidentified in one source as the "New York Police" Commissioners. In fact it is of the United States Sanitary Commission. From left to right: Dr. William Van Buren, George T. Strong, Commission President Henry Whitney Bellows, Dr. Cornelius R. Agnew, and Dr. Oliver Wolcott Gibbs.

At the outbreak of the Civil War, he planned the United States Sanitary Commission, of which he was the only president (1861 to 1878). He inspired the organization of chapters of the USSC in cities across the country, and the recruiting of thousands of volunteers to help Union soldiers. The organization raised millions of dollars for the war effort and to support soldiers and veterans.

He was the first president of the first Civil Service Reform Association organized in the United States (1877), and was an organizer of the Union League Club of New York and of the Century Association in New York City. Together with his parishioner and friend, Peter Cooper, he established Cooper Union, the design school that was free for students until the 21st century. In 1865 he proposed and organized the National Conference of Unitarian and other Christian churches, and from 1865 to 1880 was chairman of its council.

He died in New York City on 30 January 1882. A bronze memorial tablet by Augustus Saint-Gaudens was unveiled in All Souls church in 1886.

== Works ==
His published writings include:

- Restatements of Christian Doctrine in Twenty-Five Sermons (1860)
- Unconditioned Loyalty (1863), a strong pro-Union sermon, which was widely circulated during the Civil War
- The Old World in its New Face: Impressions of Europe in 1867-1868 (2 vols, 1868-1869)
- Historical Sketch of the Union League Club (1879)
- Twenty-Four Sermons in All Souls Church, New York, 1865-1881 (1886)
