= United States Sanitary Commission =

American Civil War relief agency

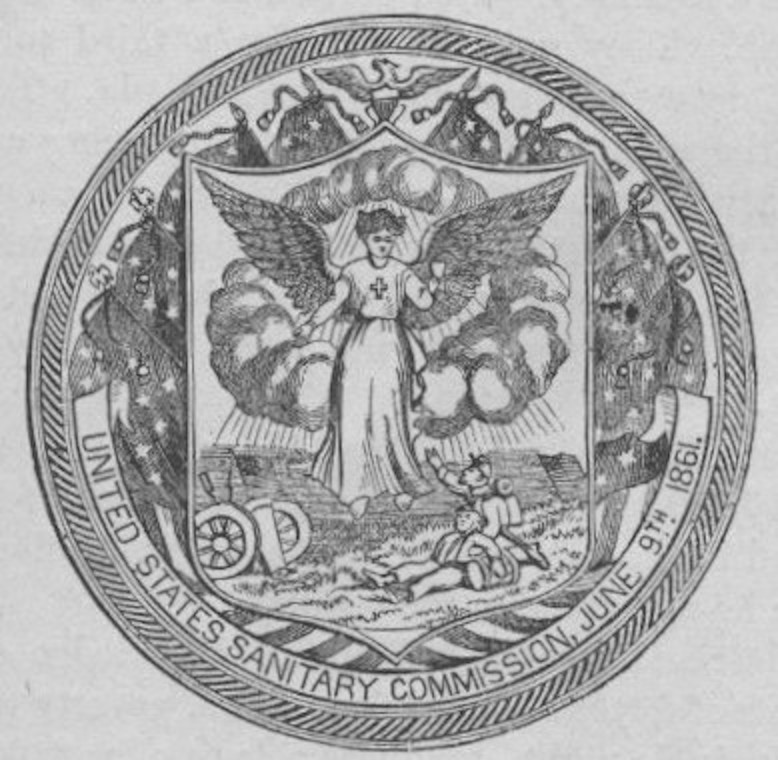
- Official seal of the Commission
- Formation: June 18, 1861
- Founder: Henry Whitney Bellows
- Dissolved: May 1866
- Type: Private relief agency
- Headquarters: United States Treasury Building
- Location: Washington, D. C., United States
- Services: Support for sick and wounded soldiers of the Union Army
- President: Henry Whitney Bellows
- Executive Secretary: Frederick Law Olmsted
- Treasurer: George Templeton Strong
- Budget: $25,000,000 (total)

The United States Sanitary Commission (USSC) was a private relief agency created by federal legislation on June 18, 1861, to support sick and wounded soldiers of the United States Army (Federal / Northern / Union army) during the American Civil War. (Note: The official warrant or order for the organization of the Sanitary Commission appears to have issued from the War Department office, Sunday, 9th June 1861, and to have received President Lincoln's signature four days subsequently.) It operated across the North, raised an estimated US$25 million in Civil War era revenue (assuming 1865 dollars, $525.82 million in 2025) and in-kind contributions to support the cause, and enlisted thousands of volunteers. The president was Henry Whitney Bellows, and Frederick Law Olmsted acted as executive secretary. It was modeled on the British Sanitary Commission, set up during the Crimean War (1853–1856), and from the British parliamentary report published after the Indian Rebellion of 1857 ("Sepoy Rebellion"). (Note: Additionally, the medical reports of Edmund Alexander Parkes including the British army medical dispatches, the findings of the Royal Sanitary Commission, and first-hand knowledge acquired by Florence Nightingale were compiled in her "Notes On the Care and Treatment of Sick and Wounded During the Late War in the East, and On the Sanitary Requirements of the Army Generally" (London: 1858). These were also considered in the establishment of the United States Sanitary Commission.)

== History ==
Henry Whitney Bellows (1814–1882), a Massachusetts clergyman, planned the USSC and served as its only president. (Note: Rev. Dr. Bellows, President of the Commission, provided a graphic statement (following his preliminary tour through the Western encampments) in a letter to a New York City auxiliary committee of finance. Camp diseases, the irregularity of life, exposure, filth, heat and crowded conditions were described in this letter.) According to The Wall Street Journal, "its first executive secretary was Frederick Law Olmsted, (1822–1903), the famed landscape architect who designed New York's Central Park". George Templeton Strong (1820–1875), New York lawyer and diarist, helped found the commission and served as treasurer and member of the executive committee.

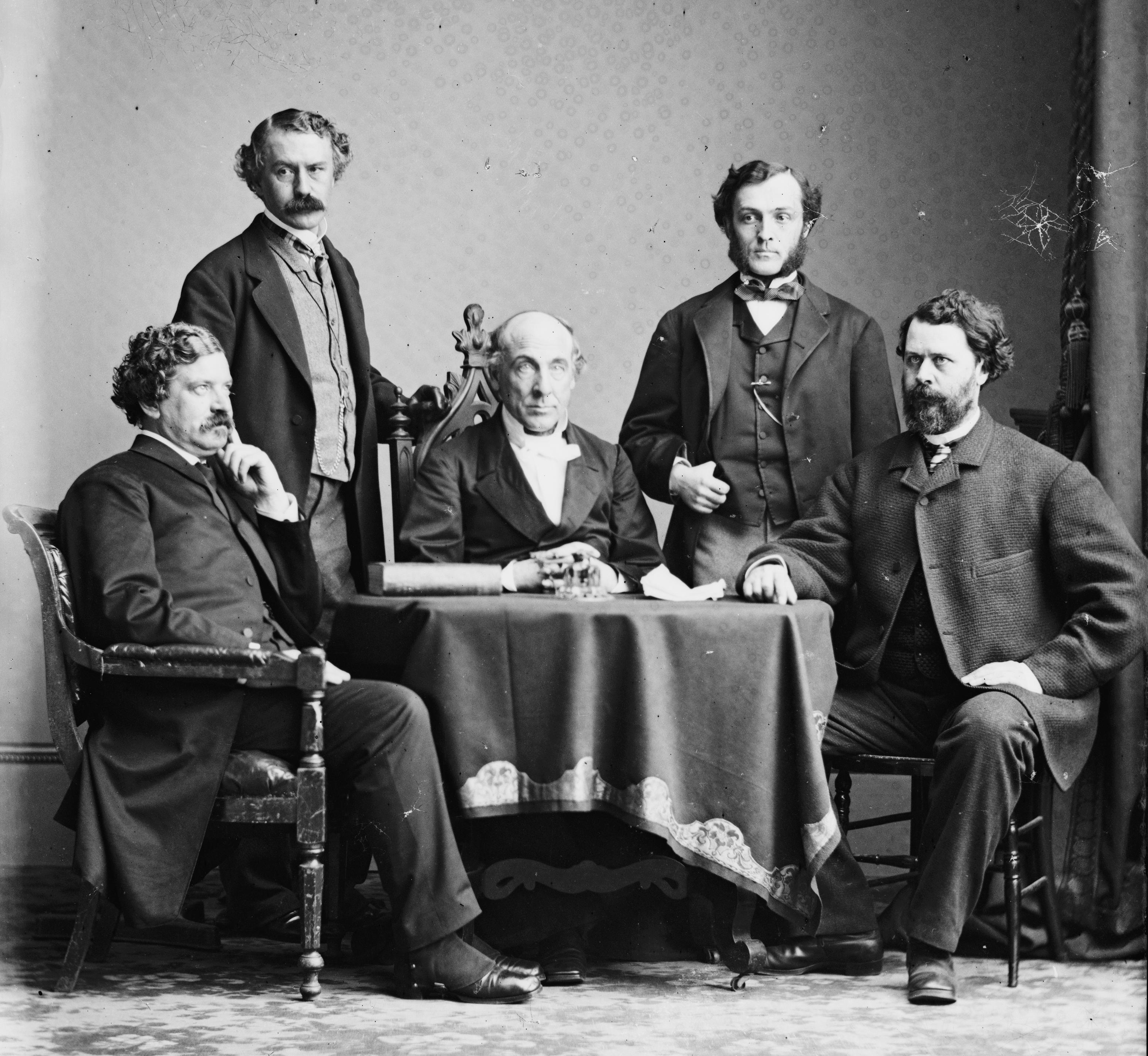
Leaders of the Sanitary Commission. From left to right: Dr. William Van Buren, George T. Strong, Commission President Henry Whitney Bellows, Dr. Cornelius R. Agnew, and Dr. Oliver Wolcott Gibbs.

In June 1861, the Sanitary Commission set up its central office inside the United States Treasury Building, just east of the Executive Mansion (now the White House), on Pennsylvania Avenue and 15th Street in central Washington, D.C. By late October 1861, the USSC Central Office and the U.S. War Department had received detailed studies and reports from the Sanitary Inspectors of more than four hundred regimental camp inspections. The rapidly crowded events of those first six months of the war displayed the sheer gravity of the situation in which the adjustment to the means and agencies were desperately needed to ensure a high health-rate in all those untrained Union army regiments.

Immediately following the First Battle of Bull Run in July 1861, the first orders and receipts submitted to the Central Office began to arrive from the military Union Army hospitals at Alexandria, Virginia, and Washington, D.C., requesting waterbeds, small tables for writing in bed, iron wire cradles for protecting wounded limbs, dominoes, checkerboards, Delphinium and hospital gowns for the wounded. (Note: Additionally, money donations were requested by the Sanitary Commission to support these military Union hospitals. These funds were received by George T. Strong, Treasurer of the Commission, 68 Wall Street, N.Y., and George S. Coe, Treasurer of Central Executive Committee, American Exchange Bank, N.Y.)

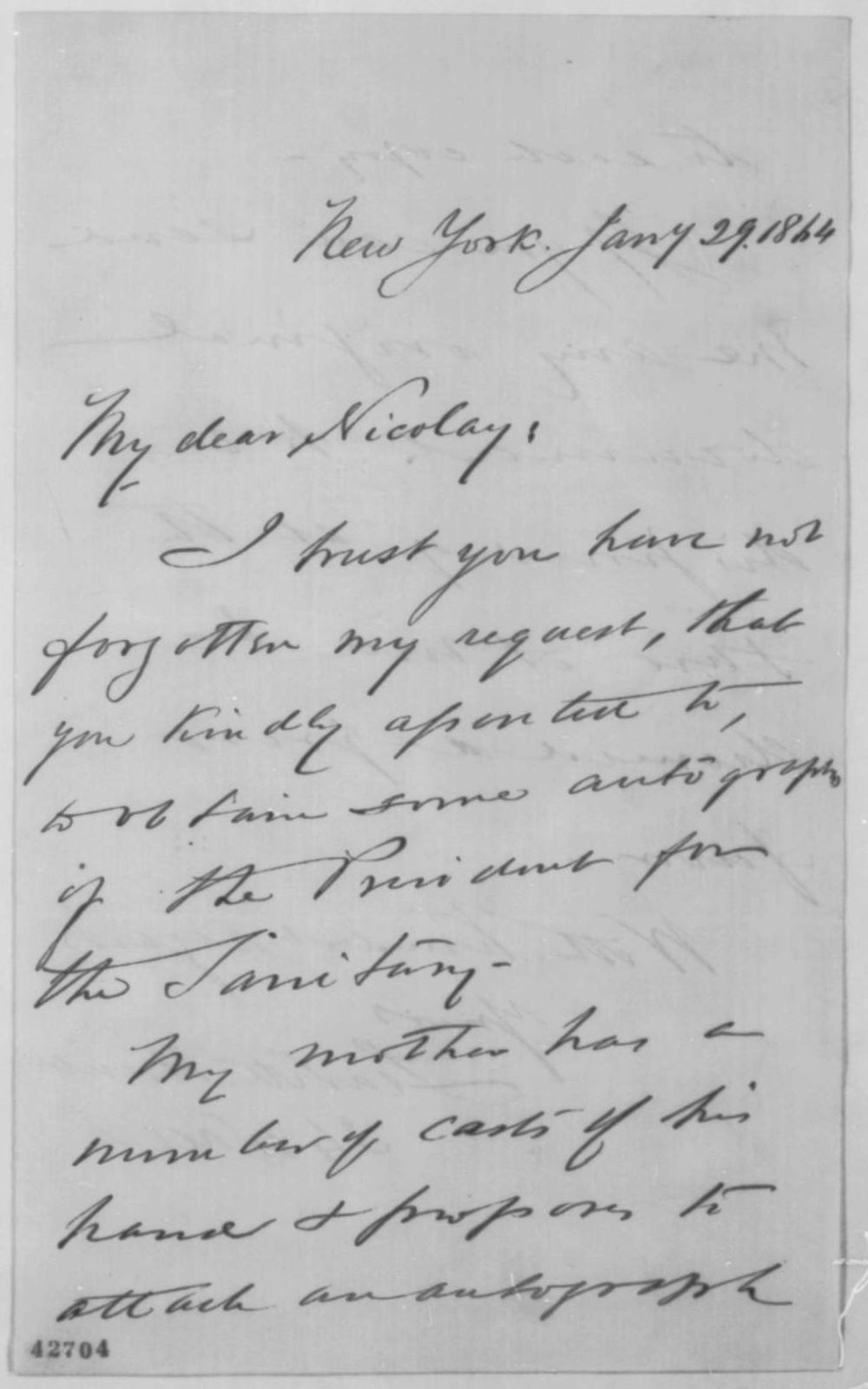
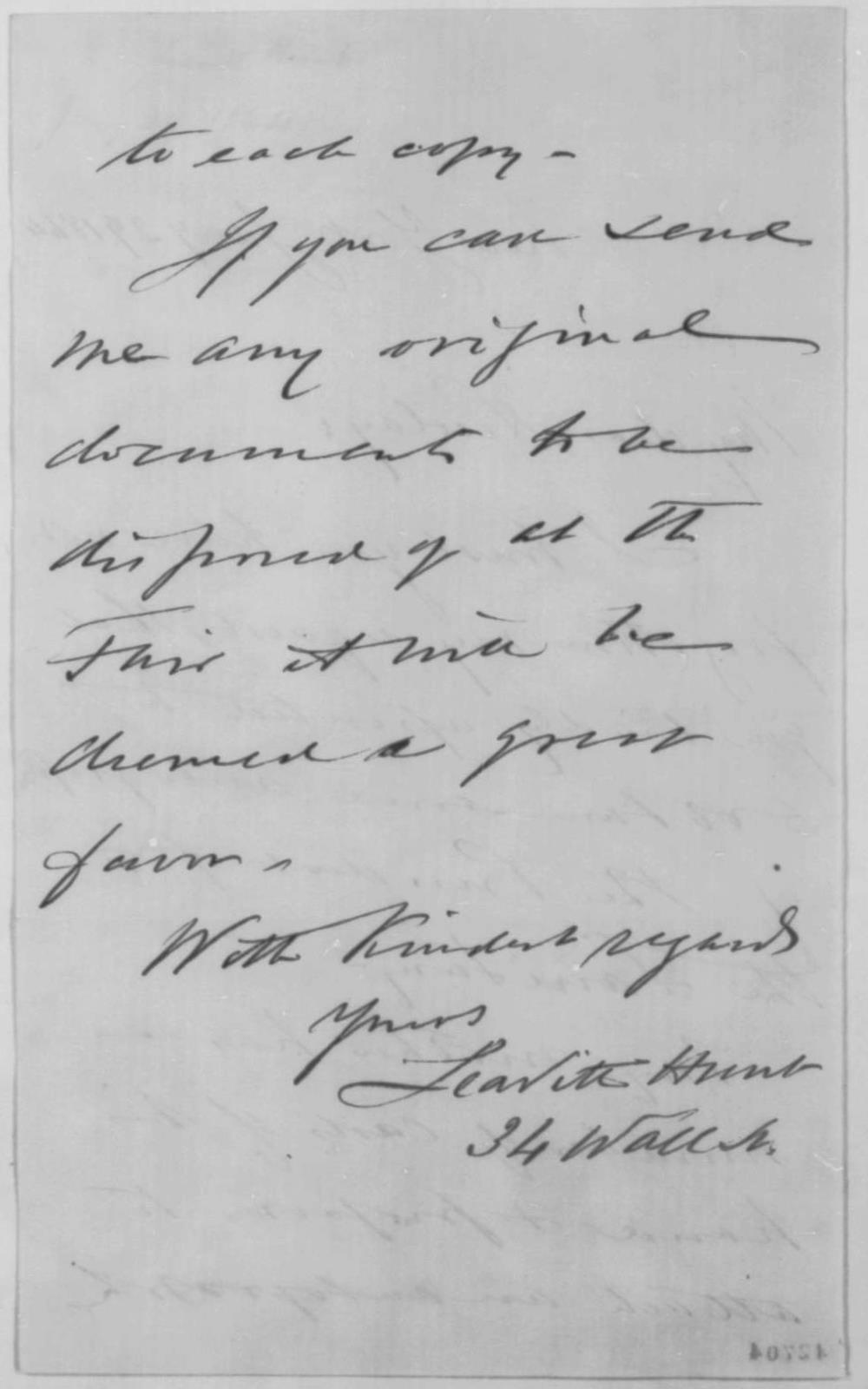
Letter from Col. Leavitt Hunt to John George Nicolay requesting documents with Abraham Lincoln's signature.

The demands of the war soon required more frequent decision-making. This led to the creation of the Standing Committee, which met on a nearly daily basis in New York City where most of its members resided. The Standing Committee initially consisted of five commissioners who retained their position for the entire war: Henry W. Bellows, George Templeton Strong, William H. Van Buren, M.D., Cornelius R. Agnew, M.D., and Wolcott Gibbs, M.D.

In addition to setting up and staffing hospitals, the USSC operated 30 soldiers' homes, lodges, or rest houses for traveling or disabled Union soldiers. Most of these closed shortly after the war.

Also active in the association was Colonel Leavitt Hunt (1831–1907), a New York lawyer and pioneering photographer. In January 1864, he wrote to 16th president Abraham Lincoln's secretary John George Nicolay asking that Nicolay forward him any documents he might have available with the President's signature. Hunt's mother, the widow of Vermont congressman Jonathan Hunt, planned to attach Lincoln's signature to copies of several casts of the President's hand, to be sold to raise funds for the war effort. Other fund raising events included the famous 50 pound sack of flour that was auctioned off by Reuel Colt Gridley. By auctioning off the same sack of flour, which was then re-donated to be sold again, Gridley eventually raised more than $250,000.00 for the Sanitary Commission.

States could use their own tax money to supplement the Commission's work, as Ohio did. Under the energetic leadership of Governor David Tod, a War Democrat who won office on a coalition "Union Party" ticket with Republicans, Ohio acted vigorously. Following the unexpected carnage at the Battle of Shiloh in April 1862, it sent three steamboats to the scene as floating hospitals with doctors, nurses and medical supplies. The state fleet expanded to eleven hospital ships. The state also set up 12 local offices in main transportation nodes to help Ohio soldiers moving back and forth.

The government constructed the Pension Building in Washington, D.C. to handle all the staff to process the pension requests and administer them. Its successor, built as a permanent building in the 1880s, is now listed on the National Register of Historic Places. After the war, the USSC volunteers continued to work with Union Army veterans to secure their bounties, back pay, and apply for pensions. It supported the "health and hygiene" of the veterans. They had a Department of General Relief which accepted donations for veterans, too. The USSC organization was finally disbanded in May 1866.

=== Women in the USSC ===
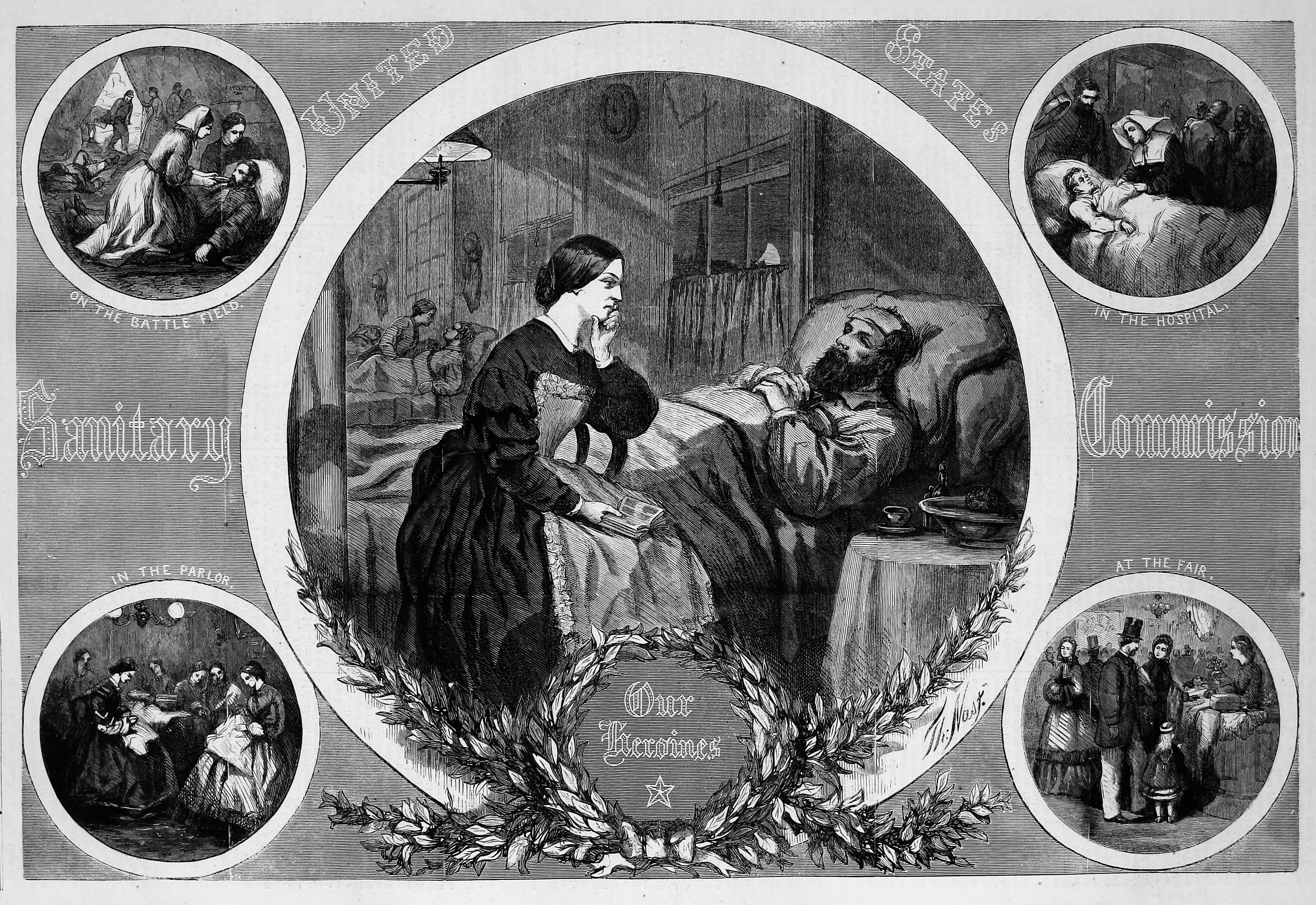
United States Sanitary Commission: Our Heroines (Thomas Nast, Harper's Weekly April 9, 1864)

Arising from a meeting in New York City of the Women's Central Relief Association of New York, the organization was also inspired by the British Sanitary Commission of the Crimean War. The American volunteers raised money (estimated at $25 million), collected donations, made uniforms, worked as nurses, ran kitchens in army camps, and administered hospital ships, soldiers' homes, lodges, and rests for traveling or disabled soldiers. They organized Sanitary Fairs in numerous cities to support the Federal army with funds and supplies, and to raise funds for the work of the USSC. Women who were prominent in the organization, often traveling great distances, and working in harsh conditions, included Louisa May Alcott, Almira Fales, Eliza Emily Chappell Porter, Katherine Prescott Wormeley, and many others.

Dorothea Dix, serving as the commission's superintendent, convinced the medical corps of the value of women working in their hospitals. Over 15,000 women volunteered to work in hospitals, usually in nursing care. They assisted surgeons during procedures, gave medicines, supervised the feedings and cleaned the bedding and clothes. They gave good cheer, wrote letters the men dictated, and comforted the dying. A representative nurse was Helen L. Gilson (1835–68) of Chelsea, Massachusetts, who served in Sanitary Commission. She supervised supplies, dressed wounds, and cooked special foods for patients on a limited diet. She worked in hospitals after the battles of Antietam, Fredericksburg, Chancellorsville and Gettysburg. She was a successful administrator, especially at the hospital for black soldiers at City Point, Virginia. The middle-class women who volunteered provided vitally needed nursing services and were rewarded with a sense of patriotism and civic duty in addition to the opportunity to demonstrate their skills and gain new ones, while receiving wages and sharing the hardships of the men.

Mary Livermore, Mary Ann Bickerdyke, and Annie Wittenmeyer played leadership roles. After the war some nurses wrote memoirs of their experiences; examples include Dix, Livermore, Sarah Palmer Young, and Sarah Emma Edmonds. Bridget Diver also worked for the Commission.

== Sanitary Fairs ==
From the outset, many local groups sponsored fund-raising events to benefit the Commission. As the war progressed, these became larger and more elaborate Sanitary Fairs. One of the first events was in Lowell, Massachusetts, 1863. Groups in other cities soon adopted this plan. Organizing these Sanitary Fairs offered ways for local communities to be directly part of supporting the war effort of the nation. The largest Sanitary Fair during the war was held in Chicago in 1863. Chicago held a second sanitary fair in 1865.

== Notable members ==
- Louisa May Alcott served as a nurse for the Sanitary Commission at a Union Army Hospital in Georgetown.
- Martia L. Davis Berry raised supplies for the Great Northwestern Sanitary Fair (Chicago, 1865), receiving medal No. 15 for her services
- Mary Ann Bickerdyke served as a nurse for the Sanitary Commission and is credited with establishing 300 field hospitals during the Civil War
- Henry Whitney Bellows served as the President of the Commission.
- Atherton Blight, served as a Director of the Commission.
- Samuel Howe served as a Director of the Commission.
- Mary Livermore led the Northwestern Branch of the Sanitary Commission
- John Strong Newberry
- Frederick Law Olmsted served as the Executive Secretary of the Sanitary Commission.
- George Templeton Strong was Treasurer of the Commission
- Mary Tileston Hemenway was a philanthropist who helped to fund the Commission.

== Legacy ==
The U.S. Sanitary Commission is memorialized by a group of re-enactors who portray the Boston branch of the commission at various civic events, educational programs, and Civil War re-enactments. The group is based out of the Greater Boston area of Massachusetts.

== Gallery ==
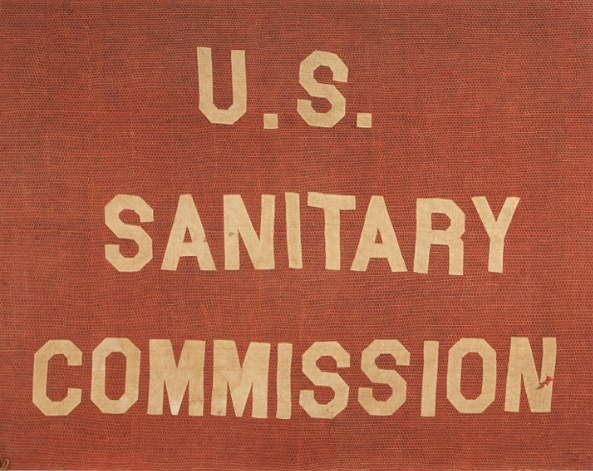
Commission flag

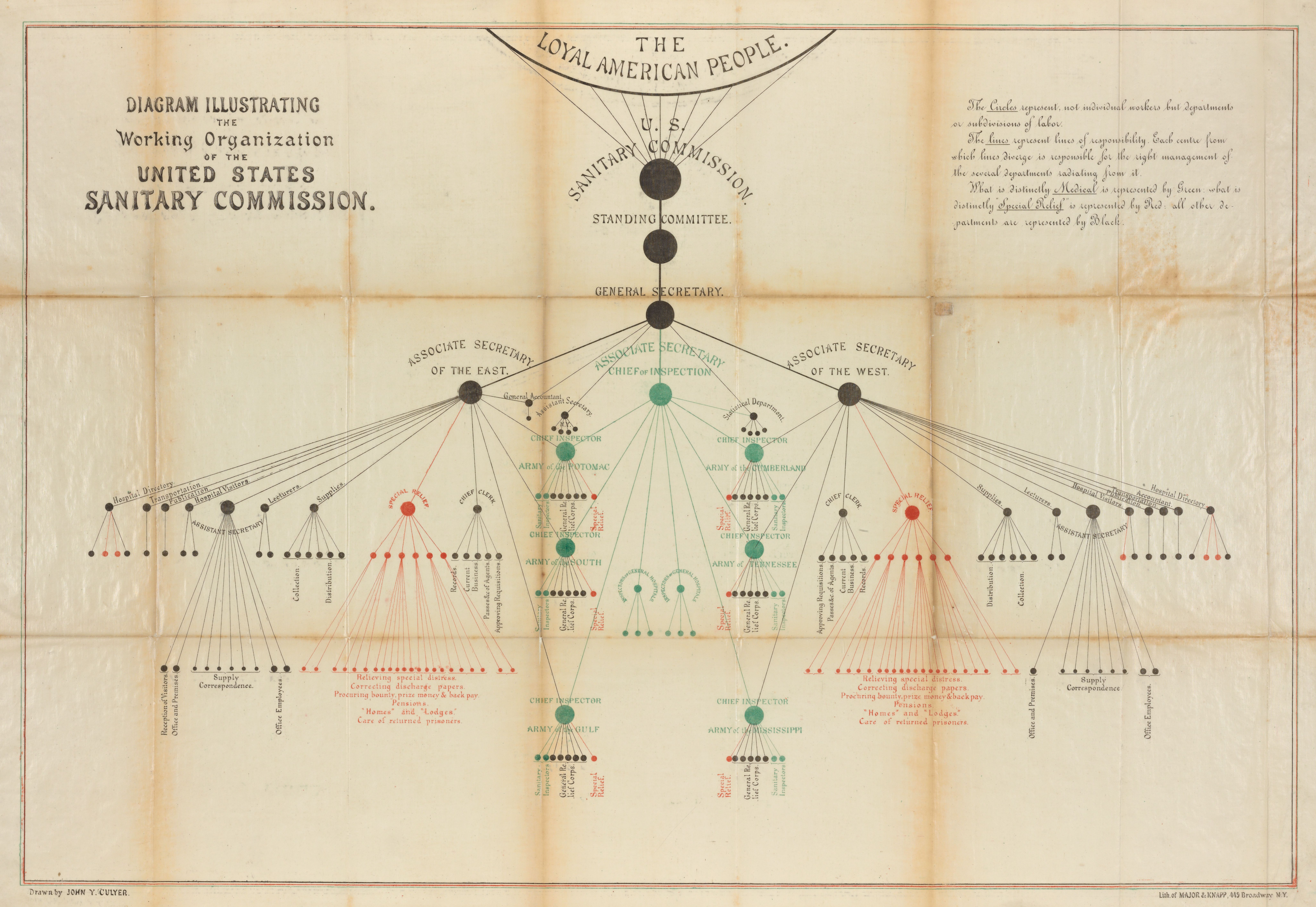
Organizational chart of the Sanitary Commission by John Y. Culyer, 1864

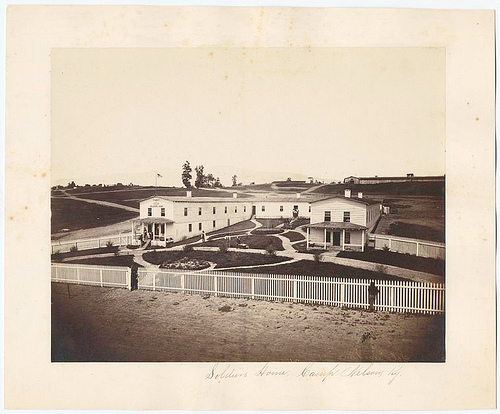
Soldiers' home at Camp Nelson, Kentucky

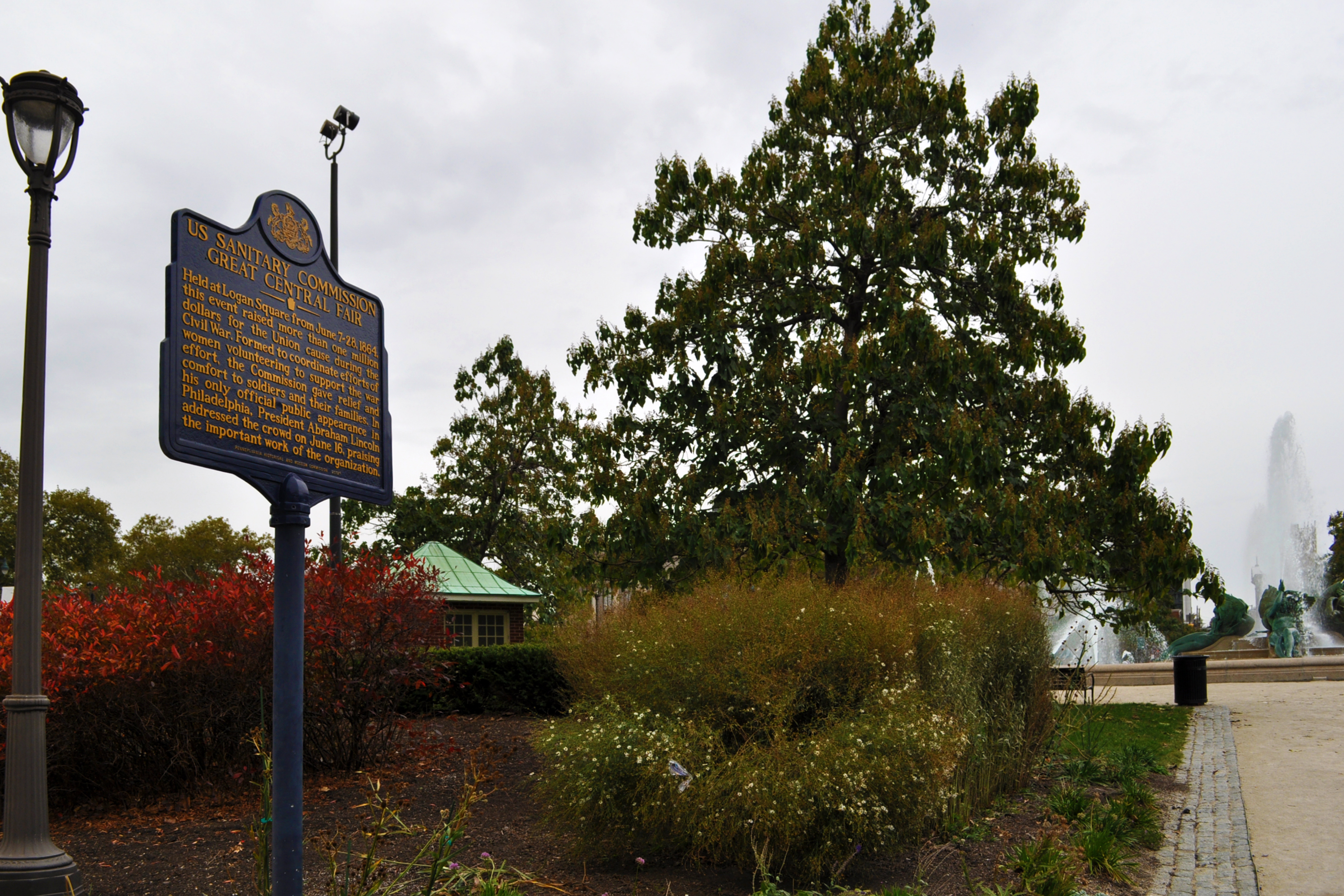
Great Central Fair historical Marker, Philadelphia

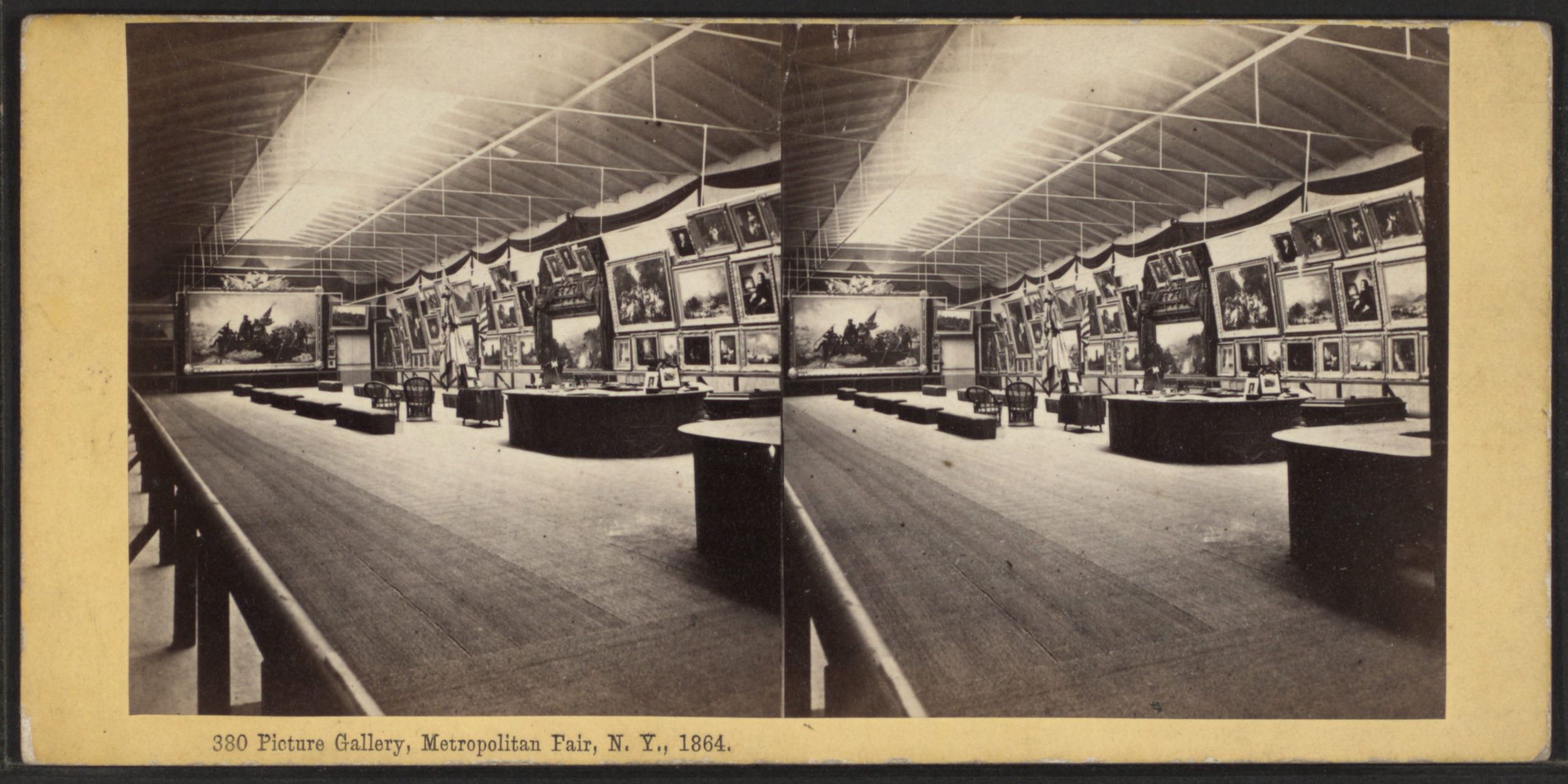
Stereoscopic image of the picture gallery at the Metropolitan Fair of 1864 held in New York State

== See also ==
- United States Christian Commission, a similar organization
- Western Sanitary Commission, a smaller rival based in St. Louis
- Hospital Ships of the Sanitary Commission
