= Northwestern Sanitary Fair =

The Northwestern Sanitary Fair
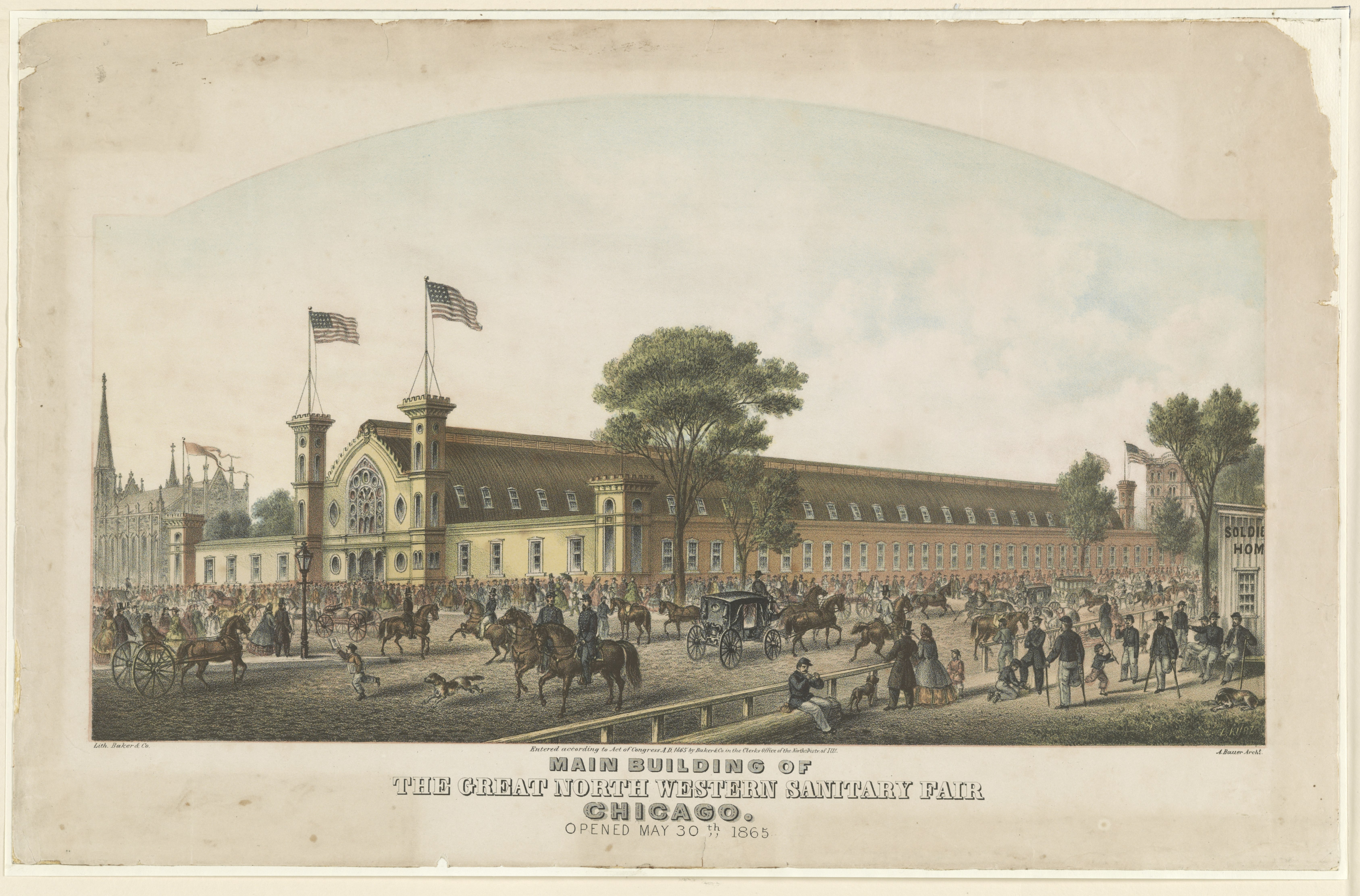
- Main fair building
- Date: March 30 – June 24, 1865
- Venue: Northwestern Sanitary Fair building
- Location: Dearborn Park, Chicago, Illinois
- Type: Fair
- Cause: Civil War
- Motive: Raise funds and supplies for the Union Army
- Target: American citizens
- Organised by: United States Sanitary Commission
- Outcome: net proceeds, US$400,000

Northwestern Sanitary Fair (also known as the Great Northwestern Sanitary Fair) was a fund-raising event of the United States Sanitary Commission (USSC), held in Chicago, Illinois. It opened on May 30 and closed on June 21, 1865. It was the second time such a Sanitary Fair was held in the city, the first time being in 1863. Although the civil war had come to a sudden close, there was still great need of funds to care for the disabled of the Union Army.

== History ==
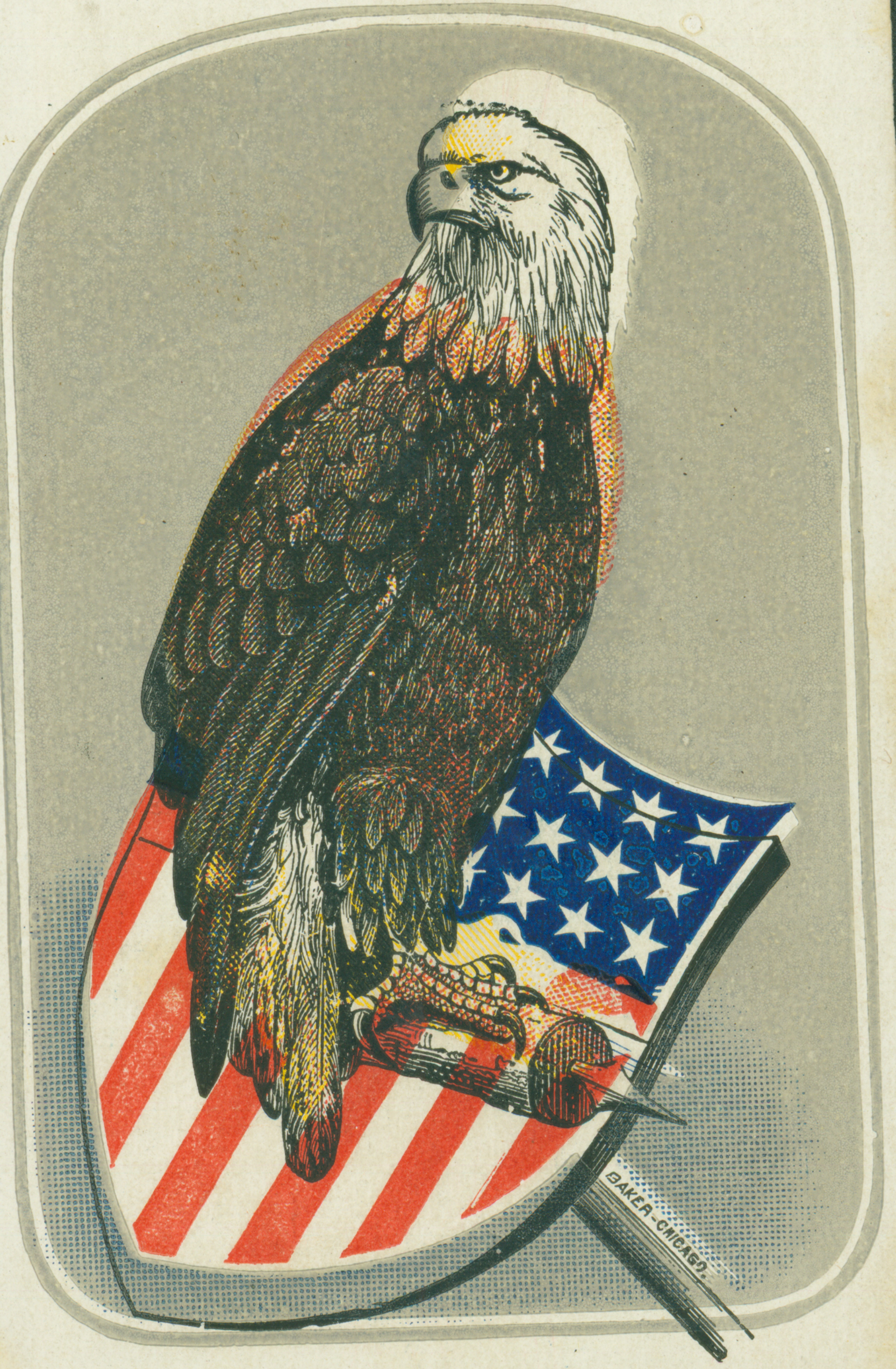
"Old Abe" on cartes de viste sold for the benefit of the fair

An executive committee was convened consisting of Mrs. Hoge, Mrs. Livermore, and Mrs. Blatchford, for the USSC; and Mrs. Hosmer, Mrs. Dickenson, and Mr. Bryan, for the Soldiers' Home. At the first meeting of the combined association, the executive committee was expanded to include: President, Hon. Mark Skinner; Vice-Presidents, Col. C. G. Hammond, E. B. McCagg, and T. B. Bryan. E. W. Blatchford, Esq., was appointed Treasurer and Secretary, and Mrs. Hoge, Mrs. Livermore, Mrs. Hosmer, and Mrs. Dickenson, Corresponding Secretaries. Committees of business men were appointed at a subsequent meeting to represent each branch of industry. The Hon. Thomas B. Bryan was the active manager; Mrs. W. T. Sherman had personal supervision of one of the departments.

Though it was originally hoped that the fair would be opened February 22nd, on Washington's birthday, the opening date was postponed until May 30th. On January 16, 1865 this organization was officially indorsed at a meeting held in the rooms of the USSC.

The inaugural ceremonies were opened by the Hon. T. B. Bryan. Mr. Buchanan Read recited the announced poem which he had written for the occasion. A hymn, written by 0. W. Holmes, was then read, but not sung, on account of the roar of human voices in the building. The band struck up instead, playing some inspiring music. Then came a speech by Governor Oglesby and some music by the 8th Reserve Corps brought the ceremony to a close.

The chief events among many stirring incidents that market the progress of the fair were the arrival on different days of General Sherman and later of General Grant.

The day exhibition closed on June 20, and the fair was only open in the evening after that date; but it continued to be well attended to the end. The 24th of June saw the close of the fair.

The net proceeds of the fair were about US$400,000, while the Sanitary Fairs in different parts of the country -offspring of the first held in Chicago in 1863- netted nearly US$5,000,000.

== Architecture and fittings ==
=== Main building ===
It was intended to lay the corner-stone with appropriate ceremonies, but on the day appointed for that purpose, news arrived that President Abraham Lincoln had been assassinated, therefore, erection of the main building commenced quietly. The building was described in The Voice as the largest of its kind ever erected in the city of Chicago. Yet it was feared that the building would be inadequate for the fair. The contract for the building was let to Mr. T. Menard, under the supervision of Mr. A. Bauer, architect.

It covered the entire space of Dearborn Park, including the iron fence around the same, and was 385 feet (117 m) in length by 162 feet (49 m) in width. It was formed into three distinct halls, connected at either end and in the centre by passages 43 feet (13 m) in width, all being under one roof.

The centre hall, extending from Washington Rtreet to Randolph Street, a distance of 385 feet (117 m), was in the form of a gothic arch, 60 feet (18 m) in width at the base, and nearly joining in the top centre at a height of 50 feet (15 m). It was supported by 23 trusses or arches, about 16 feet (4.9 m) apart.

The two smaller halls, one on each side of the main hall, were 43 feet (13 m) wide by 12 feet (3.7 m) in height at the eaves, the roof rising gradually to a height of 16 feet (4.9 m) in the center. Three other halls, or aisles, connected the center or side halls, one at either end, and one in the center, each 43 feet (13 m) in width and 62 feet (19 m) in length, extending through the main and side buildings the entire width of the whole building.

There was an open space of 8 feet (2.4 m) between the center and side buildings for the admission of light through a large number of windows, 3 by 7 feet (0.91 m × 2.13 m). The center building was further lit through 48 windows, 24 on each side, in the arched roof, at a height of 30 feet (9.1 m) from the ground. These windows were 4 by 6 feet (1.2 m × 1.8 m) in size. In the top centre of the main building was an open space, 7 feet (2.1 m) in width, protected by an overhanging roof, 4 feet (1.2 m) higher, which answered for the double purpose of affording light and thorough ventilation. There was also a similar mode of affording light and ventilation for the side buildings. Light were also afforded for the side and end halls through windows 3 by 7 feet (0.91 m × 2.13 m), at a height of 8 feet (2.4 m) from the ground, and only 7 feet (2.1 m) apart around the entire building.

There were doors for entrance and exit on Washington Street, one on Randolph Street, one on Michigan Avenue, and one on Park Place. The principal front and entrance were on Washington Street, in the center of the building. The doorway was 12 feet (3.7 m) wide, and on either side of the doors were windows of stained glass. In the center of the building, on either side of the main entrance on Washington street, was a frame tower 60 feet (18 m) in height, surmounted by a staff 34 feet (10 m) in height, which bore the national colors. Over the main entrance was a large stained glass window 225 feet (7.6 m) in height. Surmounting the center of the gothic arch, between the centre towers, was an eagle 6 feet (1.8 m) in height, supported by a large shield bearing the national device. On the corners of the building, fronting on Washington Street, were towers 30 feet (9.1 m) high, surmounted by flag-staffs 26 feet (7.9 m) high.

The entire amount of timber in the building was 400,000 feet (120,000 m). The cost of the lumber and carpenter work, exclusive of the roof, was to be US$19,000. There was 70,000 square feet (6,500 m^{2}) of roofing on the building, which was covered by felt, making all the structure waterproof.

=== Other buildings in Chicago ===
The fact that the fair was divided into different sections, in various parts of the city, rendered it a difficult matter to visit the whole of it one day. The Union Hall and Bryan Hall were about 1 mile (1.6 km) apart, and the other specialties were scattered, and not under one roof. The Artistic Departments were the Picture Gallery and the Horticultural Hall.

== Contributions ==
Contributions were received from all over the world: from England, France, Germany, Switzerland, Italy, Denmark, Sweden, Norway, China, Japan. General Grant presented “Jack,” the horse he rode while Colonel of the Twenty-first Illinois Infantry. Iowa farmers contributed four hundred acres of land. Lincoln's log cabin was imported, and erected in all its primitive uniqueness, Harriet Hosmer sent her statue of Zenobia, Carpenter his painting of “The Signing of the Emancipation Proclamation"; Bierstadt his “Rocky Mountains”; Professor Goldwin Smith presented a valuable painting; and famous literary men sent the manuscripts of their inspirations. Bryan Hall was draped with flags, and here many unique relics were exhibited.

== Medal ==
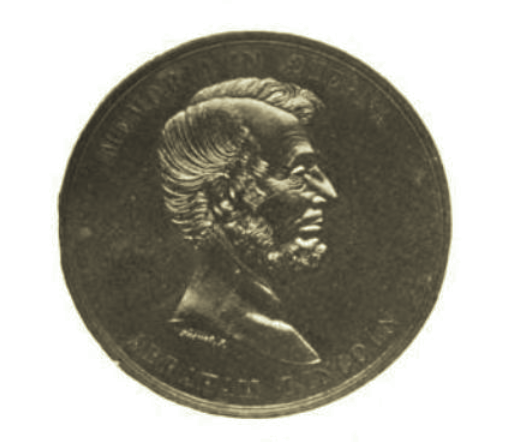
Obverse side of the medal

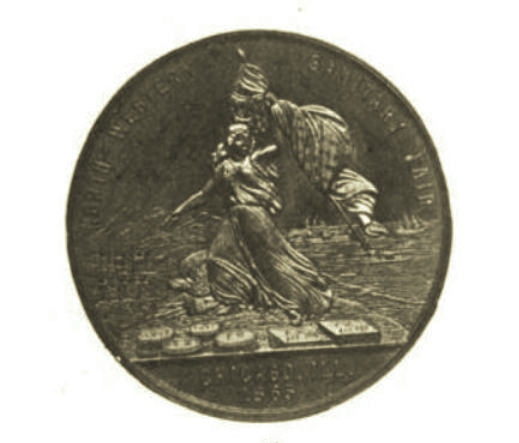
Reverse side of the medal

A bronze medal of considerable interest was struck early in 1865 to commemorate the Sanitary Fair. It was classified as AE, 57 mm. By Paquet.

On the bverse was inscribed "MEMORIAM IN AETERNAM". Nude bust of President Lincoln, to right; below, ABRAHAM LINCOLN. A curious circumstance connected with this medal is the fact that after a few impressions had been struck, a crack appeared in the die, the said crack entering the lower part of Lincoln's head exactly where the assassin's bullet pierced his brain on the evening of April 14, 1865.

The reverse contains a somewhat allegorical representation. NORTH WESTERN SANITARY FAIR. Columbia, with long chiton, standing to left and holding a large flag in left hand; to right, the lake and ships; to left, camp, and a mountain, over which rises the sun; in front, barrels and boxes of merchandise; in exergue, CHICAGO, ILL | 1865.

== Voice of the Fair ==
A publication, called the Voice of the Fair, was issued by the Executive Committee, to record progress. The Voice, a daily paper, became an attractive feature in the fair. All its profits were to be given to the soldiers. The chief literary talent of the day promised to contribute to its pages. Bryant, Whittier, Longfellow, Holmes, Lowell, H. W. Beecher, Artemus Ward—and even President Johnson, and Mr. Stanton, Secretary Welles, and Generals Grant, Sherman, and Sheridan, were under pledges to contribute something. Among the women writers there were Mrs. Stowe, Grace Greenwood, Gail Hamilton, and Anna Dickinson; and among the Governors were their Excellencies Oglesby, of Illinois, and Stone, of Iowa. Starting June 16 till the close of the exhibition, the paper was continued only twice a week.
