= List of Missouri suffragists =

This is a list of Missouri suffragists, suffrage groups and others associated with the cause of women's suffrage in Missouri.

== Groups ==
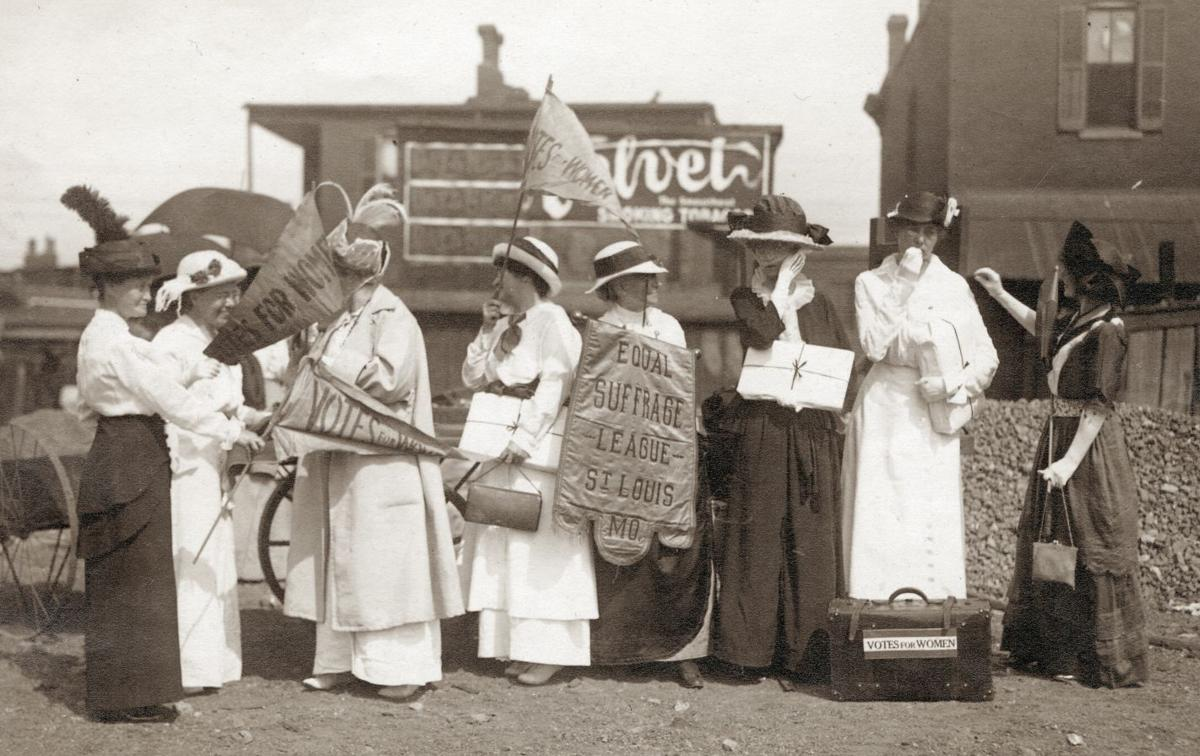
St. Louis Equal Suffrage League traveling across Missouri in 1916

- Carthage Equal Suffrage Association, formed in 1897.
- Columbia Equal Suffrage Association.
- Equal Suffrage Association of Kansas City, led by Kersey Coates and formed in 1892.
- Federated Colored Women's Clubs.
- Jackson County Suffrage Association, formed in 1918.
- Kansas City Woman Suffrage Association, formed in 1911.
- Kansas City Woman's League, formed in 1914.
- Marysville Ladies Marching Band.
- Missouri Equal Suffrage Association (MESA) formed in 1895.
- Political Equality Club of Warrensburg, formed in 1911.
- St. Louis Business Women's Suffrage League, formed in 1912.
- St. Louis County Equal Suffrage Association, formed in 1870.
- St. Louis Equal Suffrage League, formed in 1910.
- Wednesday Club, formed in 1890 by Kate Chopin and Charlotte Eliot.
- Woman Suffrage Association of Missouri, formed in St. Louis in May 1867.

== Suffragists ==
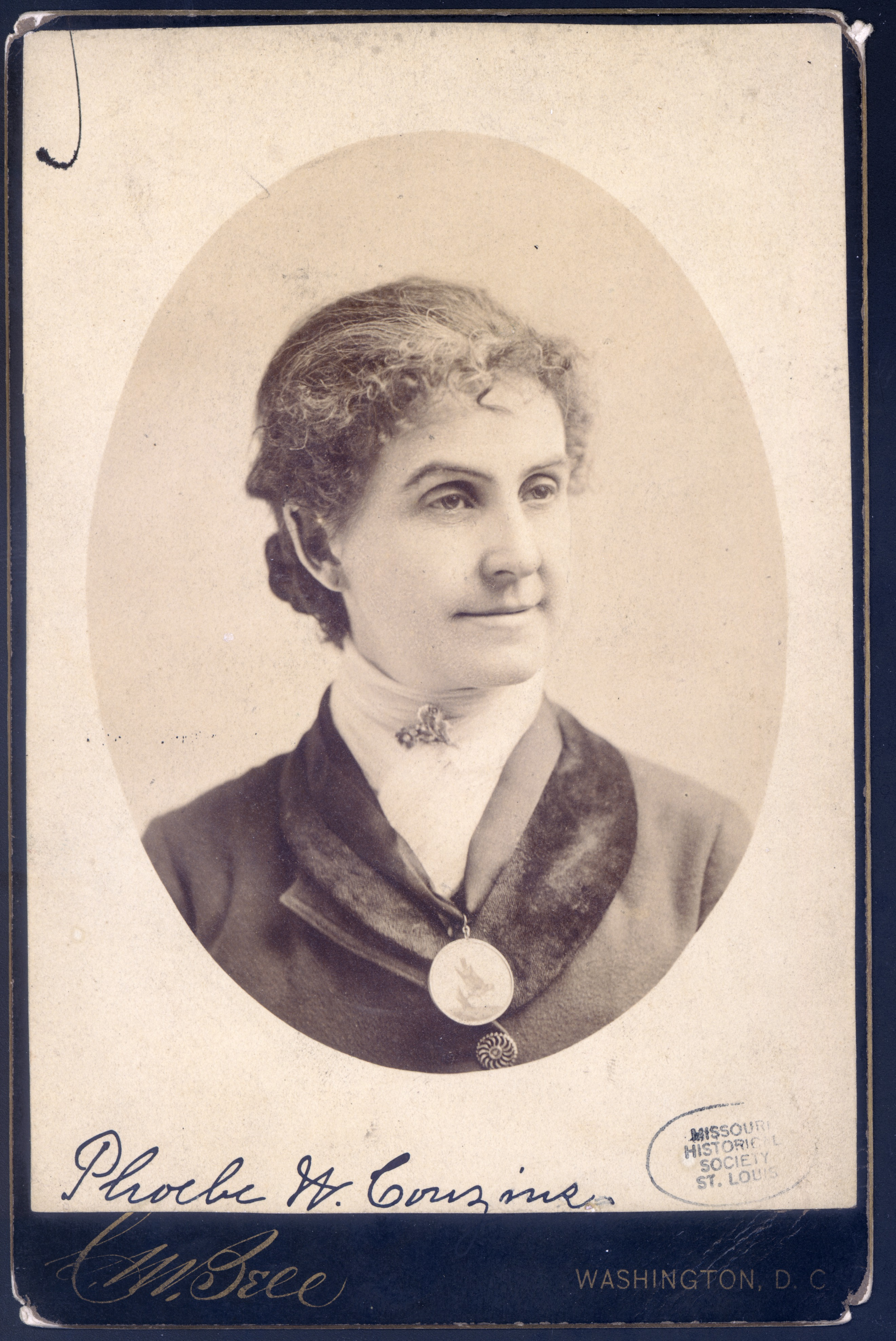
Phoebe W. Couzins

- Penelope Allen (St. Louis).
- Libbie C. Anthony (Jefferson City).
- Annie White Baxter (Jasper County).
- Emily Newell Blair (Jasper County).
- Martha H. Brinkerhoff.
- Margaret Burke (St. Louis).
- Marie Ruoff Byrum (Hannibal).
- Julia Shipley Carroll (St. Louis)
- Anna Clapp (St. Louis).
- Sarah Chandler Coates (Kansas City).
- Myrtle Foster Cook (Kansas City).
- Adaline Couzins (St. Louis).
- Phoebe Couzins (St. Louis).
- Phoebe Jane Ess (Kansas City).
- Edna Gellhorn (St. Louis).
- Lucretia Hall (St. Louis).
- Ella Harrison (Carthage).
- Rosa Russell Ingels (Columbia).
- Victoria Clay Haley (St. Louis).
- Rebecca Hazard (St. Louis).
- Virginia Hedges (Warrensburg).
- Ida Joyce Jackson (Jefferson City).
- Frances C. Jenkins (Kansas City)
- Addie M. Johnson.
- Marguerite Martyn (St. Louis).
- Helen Guthrie Miller (Columbia).
- Francis Minor (St. Louis).
- Virginia Minor (St. Louis).
- Jessie Moller (St. Louis).
- Ella Moffatt.
- Luella Wilcox St. Clair Moss (Columbia).
- Alma Nash (Marysville).
- Kate Richards O'Hare (St. Louis).
- Barbara Blackman O'Neil (St. Louis).
- Mary Whitney Phelps.
- Florence Wyman Richardson (St. Louis).
- Cecilia Razovsky (St. Louis).
- Alma Gibson Robb (St. Louis).
- Charlotte Rumbold (St. Louis).
- Laura Runyon (Warrensburg).
- Mary Semple Scott (St. Louis).
- Martha Taaffe (Jasper County).
- Clara Louise Thompson (St. Louis).
- Genevieve Tierney (St. Louis).
- Alice Curtice Moyer Wing (St. Louis).
- Victoria Conkling Whitney (St. Louis).
- Fannie C. Williams (St. Louis).

=== Politicians supporting women's suffrage ===
- B. Gratz Brown.
- Perl Decker (Joplin).

== Publications ==
- The Missouri Woman.

== Places ==
- St. Louis Mercantile Library.

== Suffragists who campaigned in Missouri ==
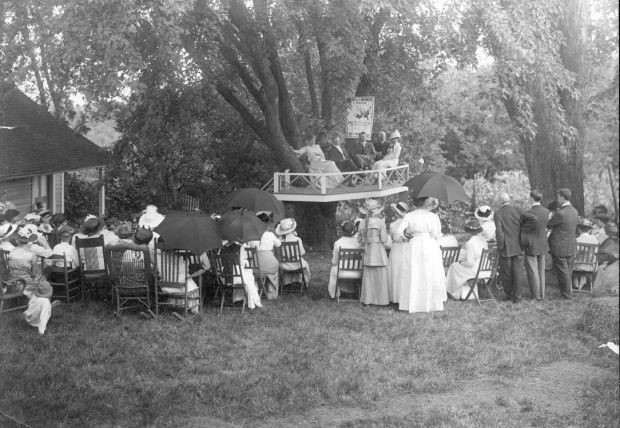
Marthasville, Missouri suffrage meeting in 1914

- Jane Addams.
- Susan B. Anthony.
- Ethel Arnold.
- Florence Balgarnie.
- Henry Blackwell.
- Mary C. C. Bradford.
- Madeline McDowell Breckenridge.
- Mary Waldo Calkins.
- Carrie Chapman Catt.
- Marion Cole.
- Hannah Cutler.
- Dorothy Dix.
- Margaret Foley.
- Clara C. Hoffman.
- Julia Ward Howe.
- Mary Seymour Howell.
- Laura M. Johns.
- Mary Livermore.
- Anne Henrietta Martin.
- Lucia Ames Mead.
- Lena Morrow.
- Emmeline Pankhurst, invited.
- Sylvia Pankhurst.
- Frances Squire Potter.
- Anna Howard Shaw.
- Anna R. Simmons.
- Elizabeth Cady Stanton.
- Lucy Stone.
- Charles Burlingame Waite.

== See also ==
- Timeline of women's suffrage in Missouri
- Women's suffrage in Missouri
- Women's suffrage in the United States
