= Luella St. Clair Moss =

American college president and prominent suffragist (1865–1947)

Luella Wilcox St. Clair Moss
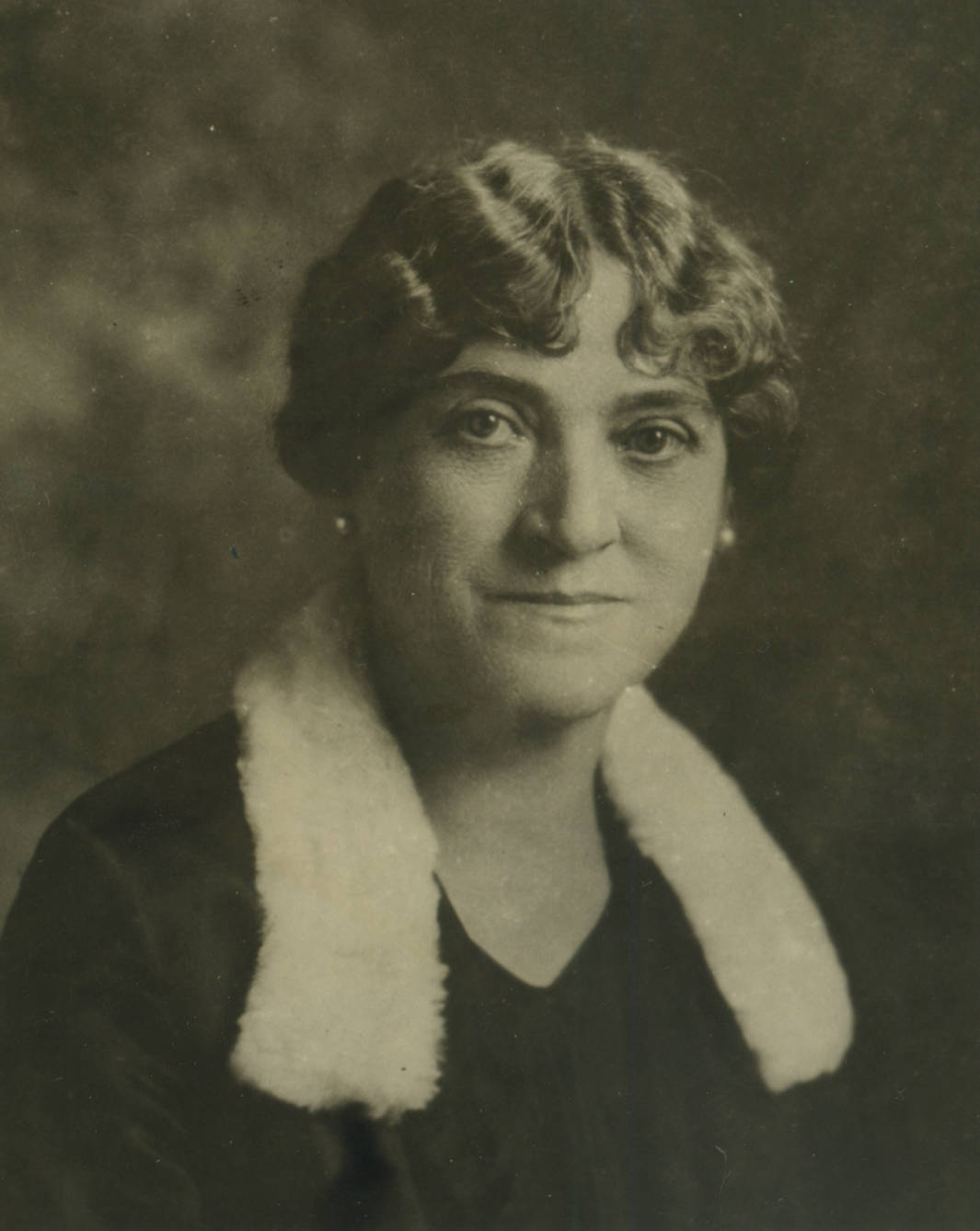
- Born: Luella Henrietta Wilcox; June 25, 1865; Virden, Illinois, US
- Died: August 18, 1947 (aged 82); Columbia, Missouri, US
- Education: Hamilton College (Kentucky)
- Occupation: college president
- Known for: higher education leadership, suffrage activism, women's rights and civic engagement
- Spouse(s): Franklin Pierce St. Clair (1886–1893, died); Warren Woodson Moss (1911–1920, died)

Luella Wilcox St. Clair Moss (June 25, 1865 – August 18, 1947) was an American educator and suffragist. She was one of the first female college presidents in the United States.

== Early life ==
Luella Henrietta Wilcox was born in Virden, Illinois on June 25, 1865, the sixth of seven children of Julia F. McLynn and Seymour B. Wilcox. Seymour Wilcox was in the grain and hay business and was elected sheriff in 1868. Educated in the public schools, Moss was the first female graduate of Virden High School and the valedictorian of her class.

In 1885, after one year's study, she received a Bachelor of Science degree from Hamilton College, a women's college in Lexington, Kentucky affiliated with the Christian Church (Disciples of Christ). Having earned a teacher's certificate at the age of 17, she stayed on at the college to edit the college literary journal, The Hamilton College Monthly. In 1886 she married Franklin P. St. Clair, the business manager and instructor in Latin and mathematics at Hamilton. St. Clair was a graduate of Bethany College (West Virginia) from which many of Lexington's colleges, including College of the Bible president John William McGarvey, had also graduated.

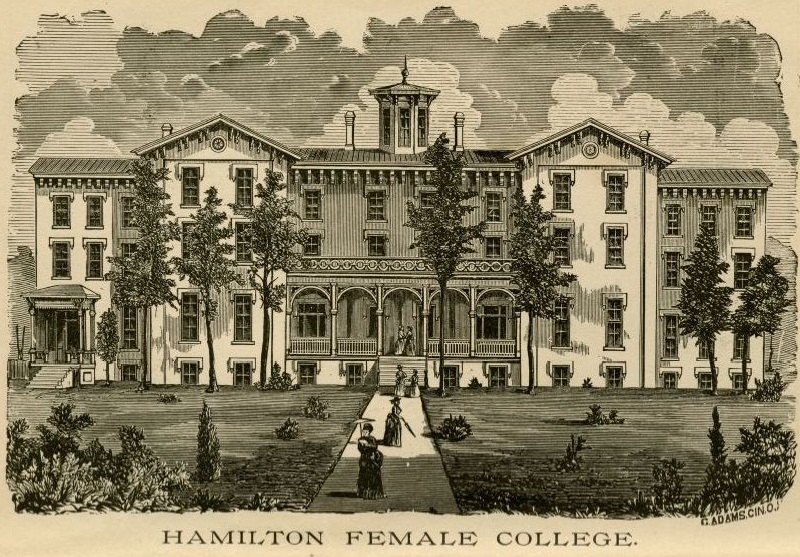

By 1888 the St. Clairs had left Lexington, and they lived for short periods in West Virginia, Pennsylvania, and Illinois. For about four years they lived in Colorado. First they moved to Montrose, Colorado for Franklin to drink the waters from the newly dug "Iron Mike" artesian well in the center of town. Their only child, Annilee, was born on February 7, 1888. According to the 1889 city directory for Pueblo, Colorado Franklin and his younger brother William lived together; and, while she is not listed as living with them, Luella probably was teaching school nearby in a rural area.

== Educational leadership ==
They moved to Columbia, Missouri in the summer of 1893 where both Franklin and Luella were interviewed for the position of president of Christian Female College, another school affiliated with the Christian Church (Disciples of Christ). William S. St. Clair came with them from Colorado and was hired as a teacher of philosophy and religion. Franklin died on November 21, 1893, and the trustees of Christian Female College then, as had been prearranged, appointed Luella St. Clair to the college presidency. She was one of the first women in the U.S. to be appointed a college president. Her goal was to make her college the "Vassar of the West" and insisted that the students use the academic cap and gown as the official uniform rather than the traditional Christian College bonnets.

Her health suffered and in 1897 she turned over the presidency to her friend Emma Frederick Moore (1893–1920). Moore was a graduate of Wellesley College and wife of Dr. William Thomas Moore of Kentucky who had recently accepted the role of dean of the new Bible College of Missouri. She traveled with her sister Maxine in Europe, returning to Columbia recovered. She accepted the co-presidency with her friend, Emma Moore. St. Clair became a founding member in 1899 of the Tuesday Club which took on civic improvements such as developing the city's public library. Suddenly her daughter Annilee died of inflammatory rheumatism on January 24, 1900.

=== Hamilton Female College in Kentucky ===
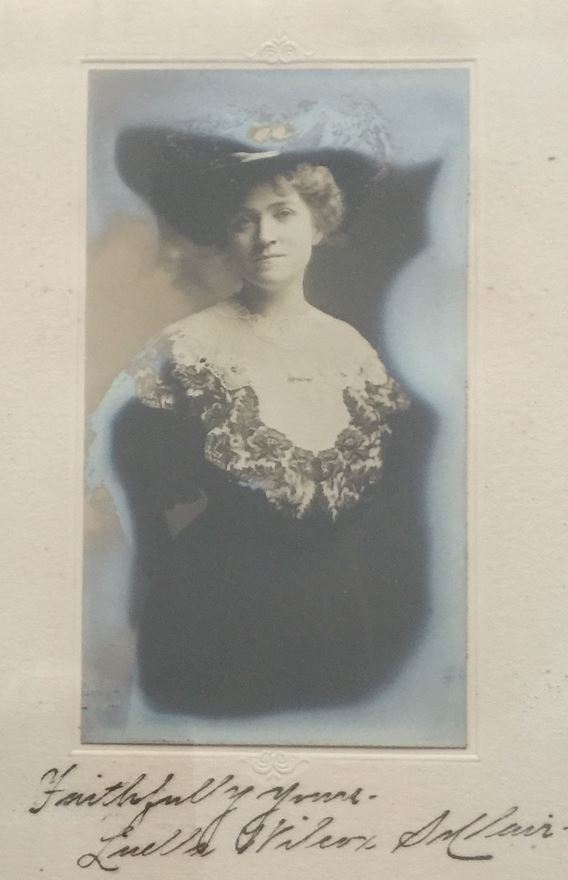
Faithfully yours, Luella Wilcox St. Clair

In 1903 the educational reformer Kentucky University president Burris Jenkins, a graduate of Harvard University and Bethany College (West Virginia), recruited Luella St. Clair to serve as the new president of Hamilton Female College in Lexington, Kentucky. Though the school had been chiefly owned by the members of the local Christian Church (Disciples of Christ), Kentucky University (later Transylvania University) had in 1878 bought a stake in the school, taking total control in 1903. This change in leadership forced out Hamilton's current president, Barton C. Hagerman, the husband of Mary Campbell who was the granddaughter of the founder of the Disciples Church. Hagerman started a new school for women, called Campbell-Hagerman College, also a private, women's college affiliated with the Disciples of Christ only four blocks away.

The St. Clairs were in Lexington by late June since Luella St. Clair was a featured speaker during the Woman's Council at the Lexington Chautauqua. The Kentucky Equal Rights Association had organized ten days of activities focused on women's role in the new century, and they featured national suffragists and peace activists such as Reverend Anna Howard Shaw and Dr. Sophonisba Breckinridge, in addition to the state's leaders in women's education. That fall, St. Clair gave the opening address at the Christian Woman's Board of Missions (CWBM) state convention in Paris, Kentucky and Burris Jenkins gave the closing address. She had been invited to speak by the CWBM president, one of Kentucky's most powerful suffragists and clubwomen, Ida Withers Harrison. St. Clair was invited to speak again at the second Woman's Council organized by the Kentucky Equal Rights Association again in the summer of 1904.

Jenkins supported St. Clair's ambitious efforts and the College grew at an unprecedented rate: a 47% increase in student enrollment within the next decade and new faculty for music, art and the newly designed domestic sciences curriculum—while at the same time introducing sports such as basketball and hockey. St. Clair's leadership impacted the school such that in 1916, several years after she had left, many of the Hamilton students and the staff hired during St. Clair's tenure as president, marched in the state's largest suffrage parade.

=== Return to Christian Female College ===
In the fall of 1909 St. Clair returned to Christian Female College as president and continued its expansion. On November 22, 1911, she married the widower Warren Woodson Moss, M.D. (1852–1920), department chair of the medical faculty at University of Missouri and internal medicine doctor at Parker Memorial Hospital. She became a widow again when Dr. Moss died of a heart attack on October 5, 1920. She then retired as president of Christian Female College.

== Political career ==
In 1912 with the creation of the Columbia Equal Suffrage Association, St. Clair Moss took a more public role in supporting women's suffrage. She was elected vice president, knowing that this was a difficult job. The male voters of Missouri had rejected women's suffrage in the state in 1914.

Her work for women's rights was acknowledged when she was elected the first president of the Missouri League of Women Voters in 1919. In 1922 she became the first woman on the Columbia Board of Education. That same year St. Clair Moss won the nomination for the Eighth District to the U.S. House of Representatives on the Democratic ticket. She closely lost the general election to the Republican incumbent with 45.4% of the vote.

In 1930 St. Clair Moss was the first woman to be elected as a vice president of the Christian Church (Disciples of Christ) international convention.

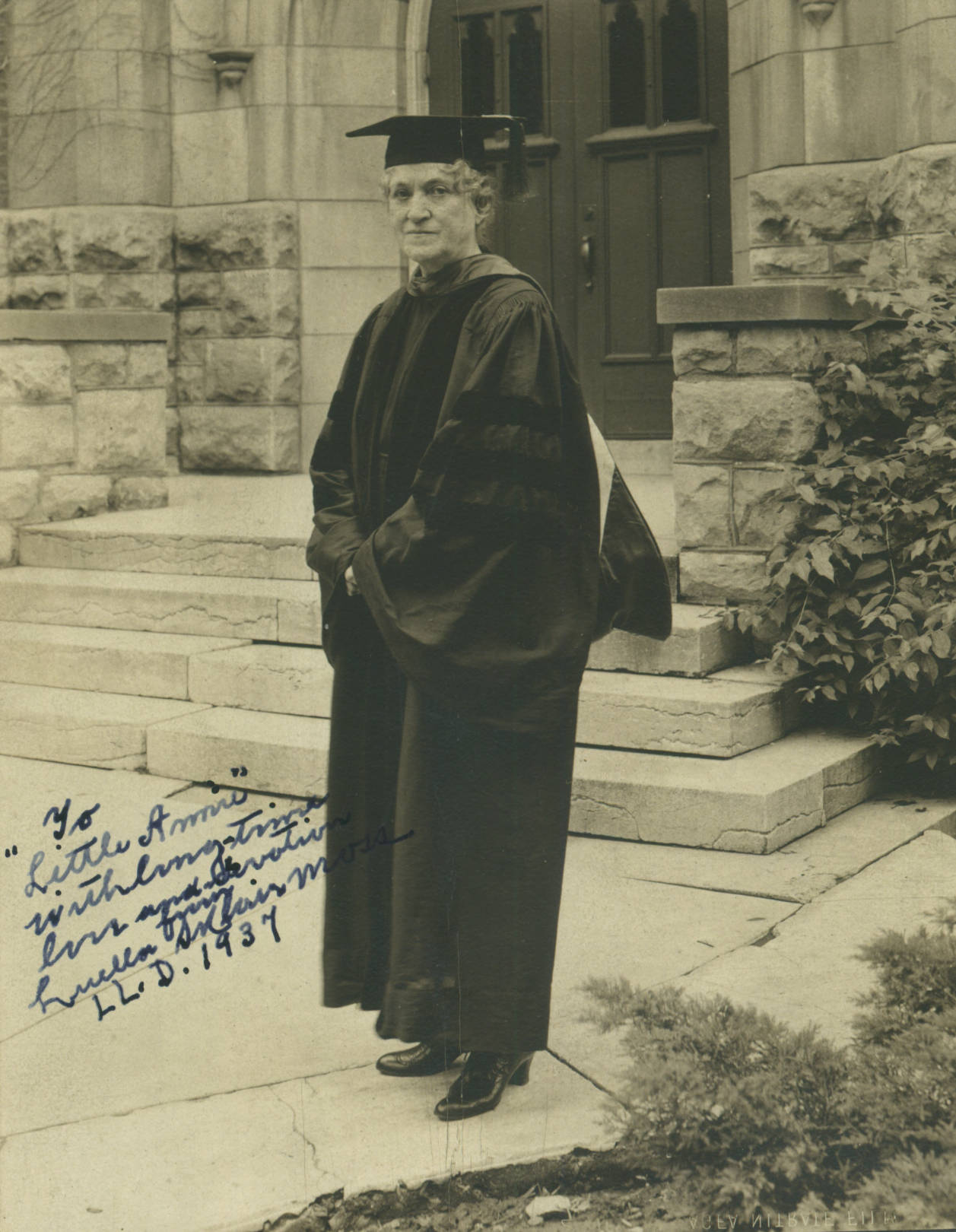
Luella St. Clair Moss, LL.D.

== Death ==
Luella St. Clair Moss died on August 18, 1947, and is buried in Columbia, Missouri.

== Honors ==
In 1937 Culver-Stockton College, affiliated with the Christian Church (Disciples of Christ) and the first chartered co-educational institution west of the Mississippi River, awarded St. Clair Moss an honorary LL.D. She was also invited for membership in Delta Kappa Gamma, a professional society for women educators.

Luella St. Clair Moss's name is included on a plaque honoring Missouri women who helped paved the way for women in Missouri to have "complete citizenship." The plaque is located on the first floor of the Missouri State Capitol in the northwest corner of the History Hall—in the east wing of the building near the capitol rotunda.

== See also ==
- Columbia College (Missouri)
- List of Missouri suffragists
- Timeline of women's suffrage in Missouri
