= Lexington Theological Seminary =

Graduate theological institution in Lexington, KY

Coordinates: 37.9964°N 84.5263°W

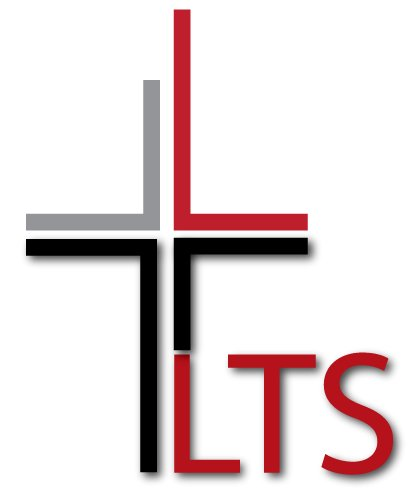
- Type: Private
- Established: 1865
- Religious affiliation: Christian Church (Disciples of Christ)
- President: Charisse L. Gillett
- Location: Lexington, Kentucky, United States
- Colors: Red and black
- Website: http://www.lextheo.edu

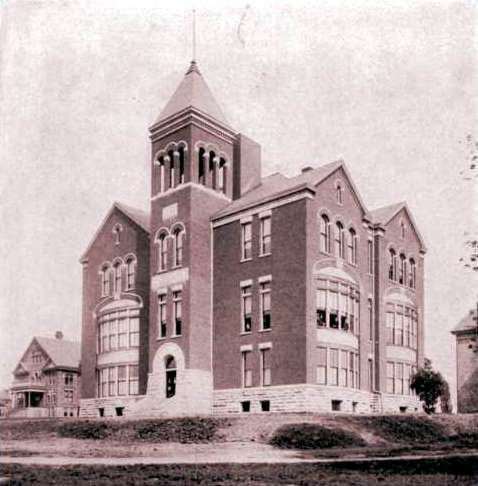
Photo of Lexington Theological Seminary (then College of the Bible), 1904

Lexington Theological Seminary is a private Christian seminary in Lexington, Kentucky, United States. Although it is related to the Christian Church (Disciples of Christ), it is intentionally ecumenical with almost 50 percent of its enrollment coming from other denominations. Lexington Theological Seminary is accredited by Association of Theological Schools in the United States and Canada to award Master of Divinity, Master of Theological Studies, Master of Pastoral Studies, and Doctor of Ministry degrees.

== History ==
Lexington Theological Seminary was founded in 1865, but its roots are older. What eventually became the seminary began as the Department of Hebrew Literature at Bacon College, founded in 1836. Bacon College was rechartered as Kentucky University in 1858 and the department was expanded. In 1865, under the economic pressure of the American Civil War, the school relocated to Lexington and merged with Transylvania University with the new school adopting the Kentucky University name (until changed to Transylvania University in 1908).

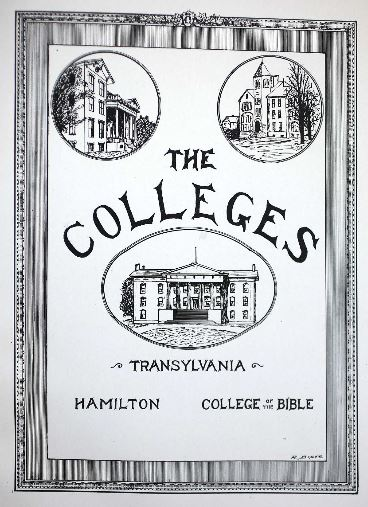
The Crimson, 1914

On the new campus the College of the Bible was formed as one of several colleges in Kentucky University. The State of Kentucky began to pressure the school, controlled by a religious body receiving federal funding as a land grant institution under the Morrill Act, to separate portions. In 1878 the College of Agriculture and Mechanical Arts and College of the Bible both received their own charters. The prior went on to become the state's primary public institution, the University of Kentucky; and the College of the Bible struggled during the presidency of John William McGarvey. In 1912, after the McGarvey's death, the College of the Bible resumed its affiliation with Transylvania under the leadership of Dr. Richard Henry Crossfield Jr. The previous president of Transylvania, Burris Jenkins, had already overseen the incorporation of Hamilton Female College in 1903. For several decades, the three merged institutions shared faculty and some administrative duties.

The College of the Bible changed its name on its centennial to the Lexington Theological Seminary. The seminary remained housed on buildings on the Transylvania University campus until 1950 when it moved to 631 South Limestone Street, across the street from the University of Kentucky.

In 2005, Lexington Seminary began sharing its campus with the Baptist Seminary of Kentucky, a seminary of the Cooperative Baptists in the state. This arrangement lasted until 2010, when BSK relocated to the campus of Georgetown College in Georgetown, Kentucky, a Baptist-related institution near Lexington.

In 2010, Lexington Theological Seminary launched a new Master of Divinity program with up to two-thirds of the required classes online. Students are required to be placed with an accountable ministry site by the time they have earned six credit hours, and they are required to complete 10 hours per week with their ministry site. The program is accredited by the Association of Theological Schools (ATS). The online course of study, coupled with 10-day intensives, make it possible for students to complete a degree at their own pace, or in three years of full-time study. The program requires 78 credit hours.

In 2011, the seminary named a new president, Dr. Charisse L. Gillett, a former Vice President and Trustee of the school, and the first woman and first African-American to serve in that role. Dr. Richard Weis also became Dean and Vice President for Academic Affairs, and Mark Blankenship joined the seminary as the Vice President for Advancement-Elect, replacing Dr. Sonny Wray, who announced a retirement date of July 31, 2012. Laura Davis was named CFO, the first woman to hold that position in the seminary's history.

On May 12, 2013, the University of Kentucky (UK) agreed to purchase the LTS campus for $13.5 million. LTS has in recent years moved most of its instruction online and doesn't require as much physical space as previously. The seminary moved to a smaller campus in Lexington. UK plans on using the buildings for the short term as temporary space as UK's Gatton College of Business and Economics begins its renovation and expansion.

On March 3, 2015, the Kentucky Legislature recognized LTS with a resolution recognizing the institution's 150-year tenure in the Commonwealth.

== Academics ==
Lexington Theological Seminary offers three master's degree programs: Masters of Divinity (M.Div.), Master of Theological Studies (MTS), Master of Pastoral Studies (MPS) as well as a Doctor of Ministry degree (D.Min.).

LTS also offers a certificate of pastoral ministry, Certificate in Continuing Education in Congregational Approaches to Technology in Ministry, Certificate in African American Ministry, and a Certificado en Ministerios Hispanos (Certificate in Hispanic Ministries).

The seminary also provides continuing education and life-long learning opportunities through The Lay School of Theology (LST @ LTS) and Creating Vital Congregations Webinars.

== See also ==
- John William McGarvey
