= Equal Suffrage League (St. Louis) =

American suffrage organisation from Missouri

The St. Louis Equal Suffrage League was formed in 1910 in St. Louis, Missouri with the aim of "bring[ing] together men and women who are willing to consider the question of Equal Suffrage and by earnest co-operation to secure its establishment."

== History ==
In May 1879, the St. Louis Branch of the National Woman Suffrage Association was formed. The organization served as a counterpart to the Women's Suffrage Association of Missouri (founded in 1867 as the first organization in history dedicated specifically to women's suffrage) which had affiliated with the more conservative American Women's Suffrage Association in 1871. Partially due to the loss of local St. Louisan and noted suffragette Virginia Minor, who had petitioned all the way to the United States Supreme Court in 1874 in the case of Minor vs. Happersett to guarantee women's right to vote through the citizenship clause of the 14th Amendment of the United States Constitution, no petitions to the Missouri legislature were made between 1901 and 1911 and there were no woman suffrage conventions in the state.

A few women kept a State suffrage organization going, but there was a general sense of apathy among women about the cause. In 1901, Mrs. Addie Johnson led the State organization, who was followed by Mrs. Louis Werth in 1902, and Mrs. Alice Mulkley in 1903. In St. Louis, which was home to one-fourth of Missourians, there was no visible presence for the suffrage movement. The largest and most influential woman's club would not allow suffrage to be discussed during its meetings. During the first decade of the 1900s, only one nationally known speaker on suffrage came to Missouri, Mrs. Carrie Chapman Catt, president of the National American Woman Suffrage Association.

The movement gained momentum when Ethel Arnold, a well known suffragette leader in England, made her first tour of America in 1910. A few women in St. Louis (among whom there was Amabel Anderson Arnold, director of the Woman's Department at the University of Chicago Law School, the first woman holding such office in the United States) organized a visit for Edith Arnold to the city and raised funds to cover her charge and the rent of a hall. Her lecture took place on April 11 of that year. It was from this visit that the St. Louis Equal Suffrage League was formed. Conservative society did not talk of suffrage and even when the Equal Suffrage League was established, it was with a cautious tone, emphasizing education rather than action. Members preferred to be called suffragists instead of suffragettes to downplay any militant activity. Ten women dared to take a stance on the suffrage movement and establish the Equal Suffrage League. The founding members were Mrs. Robert Atkinson, Miss Marie Garesche, Mrs. E.M. Grossman, Miss Lillian Hetzell, Miss Jennie A.M. Jones, Mrs. D.W. Knefler, Miss Bertha Rombauer, Mrs. Russell, Mrs. Florence Wyman Richardson and her daughter, Mrs. Roland Usher.

The ten original members sent out a call for those interested in equal suffrage to help in organizing a society. Fifty women responded and the group first met on April 10, 1910, establishing the St. Louis Equal Suffrage League. Mrs. Florence Wyman Richardson was elected president. The group immediately began trying to increase their membership. Some of the first members were men, prominent ministers from various denominations, leading lawyers, physicians, and businessmen. Branch organizations were started in public libraries around the city. At the end of the year, the League claimed a membership of 250 men and women.

In the spring of 1911, the Missouri Equal Suffrage Association was formed, after a meeting of three suffrage clubs from Kansas City, Warrensburg, and Webster Groves. The new association adopted a constitution and officers were elected. Mrs. Robert Atkinson, who had served as president of the St. Louis League was elected president. Mrs. Florence Richardson took over the St. Louis chapter. She served as president for a year and was succeeded by Mrs. David O'Neil.

== League activity ==
The Equal Suffrage League brought many speakers to St. Louis to speak on suffrage, issued press reports, organized street meetings, and established branch organizations in the St. Louis area. Some of the speakers that the group brought to the city were Ethel Arnold, the Honorable and Mrs. Philip Snowden of England, Mrs. Lucia Ames Mead of Boston, Professor Schmidt of Cornell, Professor Frances Squire Potter of Chicago, and Professor Earl Barnes of Philadelphia. On November 3, 1911, the league invited Emmeline Pankhurst to lecture at the Odeon, the largest hall in the city. The theatre nearly reached capacity. Her lecture helped to assuage fears of the ill effects of suffrage regarding feminine grace and refinement.

After a few years, the League has exhausted its means of attracting attention to their cause. A new organization, a Business Woman's League was formed in 1912 that was called to action immediately to demonstrate at a Milliner's Convention in St. Louis. The members supplied delegates with suffrage ideas and hats to distribute throughout Missouri. St. Louis women held street meetings and demonstrated at the County Fair, giving speeches from decorated automobiles. The Business Woman's Suffrage League was led by Mary McGuire, a graduate of St. Louis University Law School, and Miss Jessie Lansing Moller. The group started with 50 members and later grew to 250.

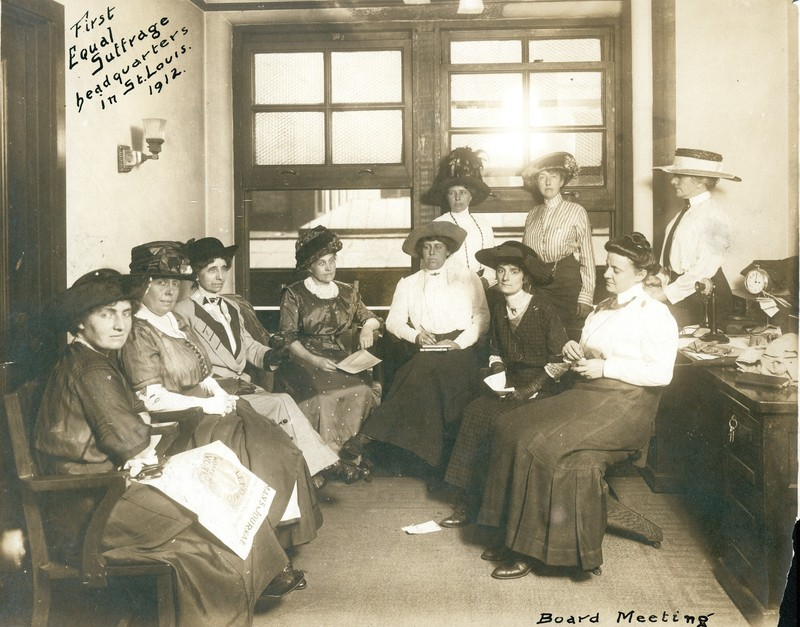
Board meeting at the first headquarters of the Equal Suffrage League of St. Louis. Missouri History Museum.

By 1913, the attitude towards woman suffrage seemed to be shifting, with support from the Farmer's Alliance, the State Teacher's Association, Prohibitionists, Single Taxers, and leading papers. Despite this support, Missouri failed to pass a suffrage amendment in November 1914.

In June 1916, the National Democratic Convention was held in St. Louis. Seven thousand suffragists dressed in white with yellow sashes and yellow parasols lining the delegates' route to the opening morning of the convention. Although the demonstration was silent, the women's voices were heard for their display of what one poem called "the Golden Lane." The "walkless, talkless parade" was made up of about 7,000 women who lined both sides of Locust Street for about ten blocks. Another demonstration was staged on the steps of the St. Louis Art Museum, with women representing states of the union arranged by their levels of support for woman suffrage. The women stood under a canopy of gold cloth, with thirteen women dressed in white to represent the twelve equal suffrage states and Alaska. Women dressed in gray stood further down the steps, representing states with partial suffrage. At the bottom of the steps stood women dressed in black, representing states where women were not allowed to vote. These actions converted some Missourians to the suffrage movement, but had little effect on the convention delegates.

During World War I, the Equal Suffrage League combined their efforts towards suffrage with war efforts. They protested the repeal of the Federal Child Labor Law and investigated the high cost of milk, among other actions. President Woodrow Wilson supported suffrage more after their display of patriotism during the war.

By 1919, the St. Louis League was successful enough to invite the National Suffrage Association to hold the Golden Jubilee in the city. The convention was held March 23–29 at the Statler Hotel, with evening meetings at the Odeon. During the convention, Miss Marie B. Ames, who had been in Jefferson City, Missouri for ninety-six days advocating for suffrage, returned to St. Louis with the news that the suffrage bill had passed both Houses.

== Passage of the 19th Amendment ==
In the spring of 1919, the 50th Missouri General Assembly passed the Presidential Suffrage bill, which gave women the right to vote in presidential elections. St. Louis League President Christine Fordyce appealed to the legislature in a speech saying, "fifty years ago my grandmother came before the Missouri legislature and asked for the enfranchisement of women; twenty-five years ago, my mother came to make the same request; tonight I am asking for the ballot for women. Are you going to make it necessary for my daughter to appear in her turn?" Ms. Fordyce's daughter would not have to make the same appeal, as soon suffrage was supported at the federal level. The Missouri legislature ratified the Susan B. Anthony Amendment to the U.S. Constitution during a special session in July of that year. Governor Gardner called a special session and then amendment passed by a vote of 125 to 4 in the House and 29 to 3 in the Senate. Missouri became the eleventh state to ratify the Nineteenth Amendment. The first eleven states ratified the amendment within a month. It would take another year for the thirty-sixth state ratified the amendment and made it a binding part of the United States constitution.

The people of St. Louis wanted to celebrate the historical occasion, and a picnic supper was held in Forest Park, with a reception following at the Municipal Theatre. Suffragists in St. Louis requested time during the program to express their gratitude for Missouri's ratification of the amendment. The ladies assembled on stage under the direction of Alice Martin. Ten women grouped in the center of the stage to represent the ten states that had ratified the nineteenth amendment. As the lights went up in the theatre, the audience applauded. Mrs. Walter McNab Miller, honorary president of the Missouri Woman Suffrage Association, gave a speech and gave Mrs. Fred L. English, president of the Equal Suffrage League of St. Louis, the banner of Missouri.

The State suffrage organization held a convention in October 16–18 at the Hotel Statler in St. Louis. After the passage of the suffrage bill, the organization changed its name to the Missouri League of Women Voters.
