= Barbara O'Neil =

American actress (1910–1980)

Barbara O' Neil
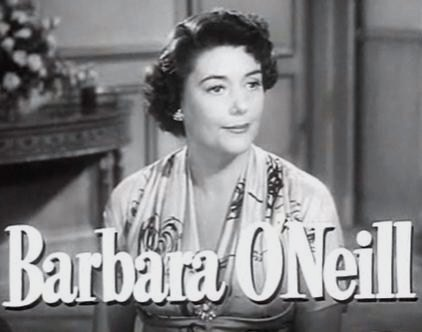
- O'Neil in Angel Face trailer (1953)
- Born: July 17, 1910; St. Louis, Missouri, U.S.
- Died: September 3, 1980 (aged 70); Cos Cob, Connecticut, U.S.
- Occupation: Actress
- Years active: 1937–59; 1970
- Spouse: Joshua Logan (m. 1940; div. 1942)
- Parent(s): David O'Neil; Barbara Blackman O'Neil

Barbara O'Neil (July 17, 1910 – September 3, 1980) was an American film and stage actress. She appeared in the film Gone with the Wind (1939) and was nominated for the Academy Award for Best Supporting Actress for her performance in All This, and Heaven Too (1940).

== Early years ==
O'Neil was born in St. Louis, Missouri, the daughter of Barbara Blackman O'Neil and David O'Neil, a "lumber baron" and poet. Her mother was a socialite and suffragist. She spent her childhood mostly in Europe and graduated from Sarah Lawrence College. Her maternal grandmother was Carrie Horton Blackman, a successful portrait painter. Her parents had a son, David, who died before O'Neil was born.

== Career ==
O'Neil began her acting career in summer stock. In July 1931, Bretaigne Windust, Charles Leatherbee (the grandson of Charles Richard Crane), and Joshua Logan, the three directors of the University Players, a three-year-old summer stock company at West Falmouth on Cape Cod, were looking for a leading lady for their repertory season that winter in Baltimore. At the suggestion of George Pierce Baker, they auditioned and hired O'Neil, one of his talented students at the Yale School of Drama. Romances born of the University Players led to three marriages: actress Margaret Sullavan to Henry Fonda for a few months in 1932, director/actor Joshua Logan's younger sister Mary Lee Logan to Charles Leatherbee, and Joshua Logan to Barbara O'Neil, briefly, in the early 1940s. O'Neil never remarried. She made her Broadway debut in a 1932 play about Carrie Nation. Her other stage credits include originating the role of Madam Serena Merle in a Broadway adaptation of The Portrait of a Lady in 1954.

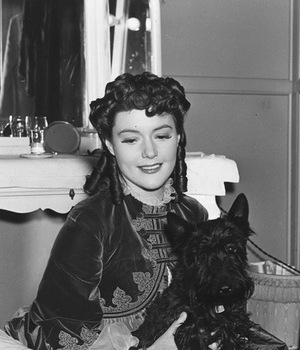
Barbara O'Neil on set of The Toy Wife (1938)

O'Neil debuted in the film Stella Dallas (1937), and was cast in the role of Ellen O'Hara, Scarlett O'Hara's mother, in Gone with the Wind (1939) though she was only three years older than her onscreen daughter (Vivien Leigh) after her role was turned down by Lillian Gish. The following year, she appeared in All This, and Heaven Too (as the wife of Charles Boyer); she was nominated for the Academy Award for Best Supporting Actress for the role of the domineering and jealous Duchesse de Praslin.

Her later films include Shining Victory (1941), I Remember Mama (1948), Secret Beyond the Door (1948) and two of director Otto Preminger's films, Whirlpool (1949) and Angel Face (1952). She also appeared in The Nun's Story (1959), starring Audrey Hepburn.

== Death ==
O'Neil died from a heart attack at the age of 70 on September 3, 1980 at her home in Cos Cob, Connecticut.

== Filmography ==
Year	Title	Role	Notes
1937	Stella Dallas	Helen Morrison Dallas	
1938	Love, Honor and Behave	Sally Painter	
1938	The Toy Wife	Louise Brigard	
1938	I Am the Law	Jerry Lindsay	
1939	The Sun Never Sets	Helen Randolph	
1939	When Tomorrow Comes	Madeleine Chagal	
1939	Tower of London	Queen Elyzabeth	
1939	Gone with the Wind	Ellen O'Hara, Scarlett's mother	
1940	All This, and Heaven Too	Francoise, Duchess de Praslin	Nominated — Academy Award for Best Supporting Actress
1941	Shining Victory	Miss Leeming	
1948	Secret Beyond the Door...	Miss Robey	
1948	I Remember Mama	Jessie Brown	
1950	Whirlpool	Theresa Randolph	
1953	Angel Face	Mrs. Catherine Tremayne	
1956	Flame of the Islands	Mrs. Duryea	
1959	The Nun's Story	Mother Didyma	
1970	Lions of St. Petersburg	Tamila	aka Leoni di Petersburgo
