= Woman's National Democratic Club =

American political organization

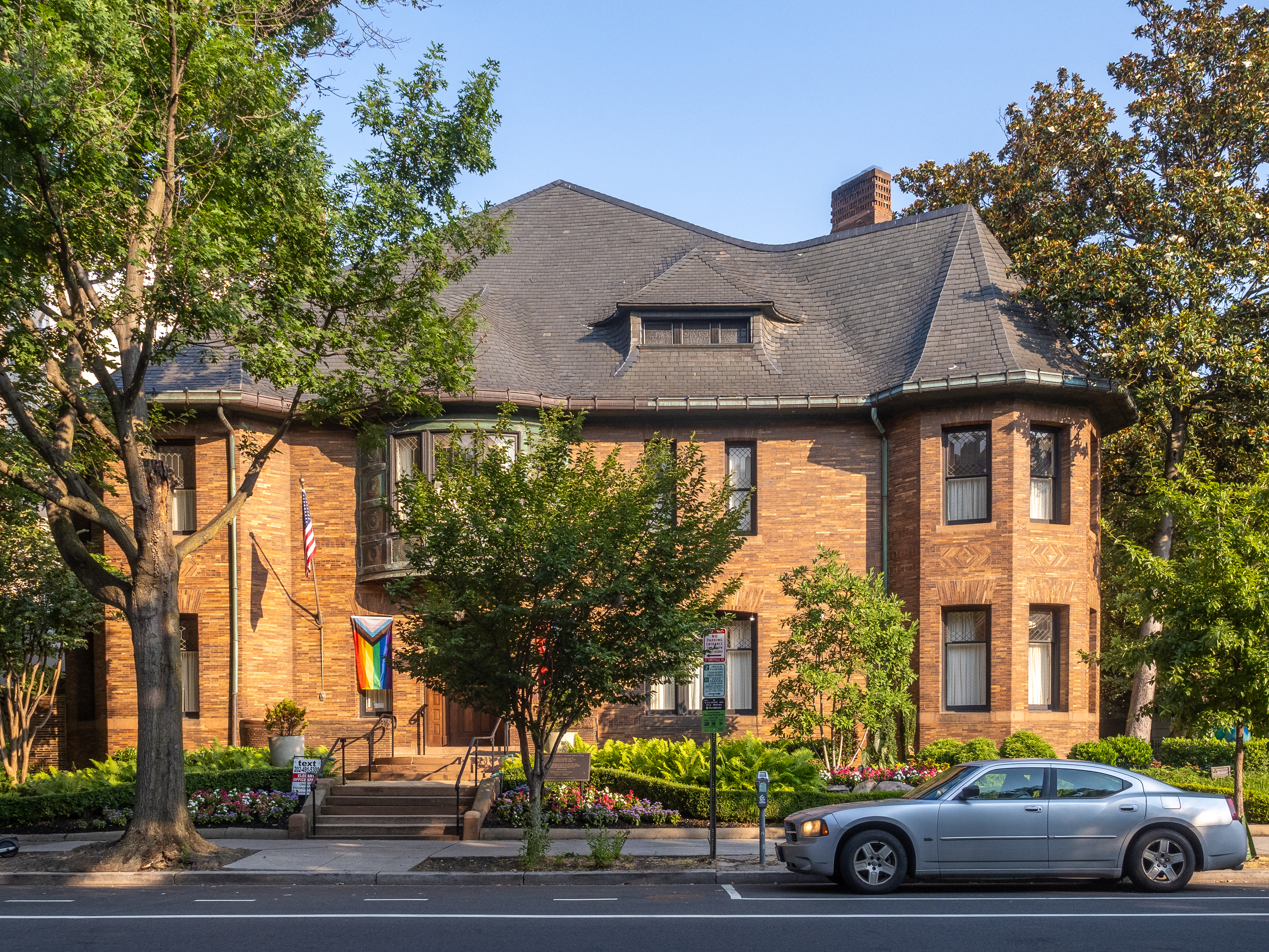
- The Whittemore House, the official headquarters of the Club
- Formation: 1922
- Founder: Emily Newell Blair; Florence Jaffray Harriman
- Headquarters: Whittemore House; 1526 New Hampshire Avenue, N.W. Washington, D.C.
- President: Rosalyn L. Coates
- Website: democraticwoman.org

The Woman's National Democratic Club (WNDC) is a membership organization based in Washington, DC, that offers programs, events, and activities that encourage political action and civic engagement.

The WNDC was founded in 1922 with the goal of providing a meeting place where Democratic women could engage in political dialogue and activities. The club was the first dedicated meeting space for women of the Democratic party.

Notable members have included Eleanor Roosevelt and suffragist Minnie Fisher Cunningham.

== History ==
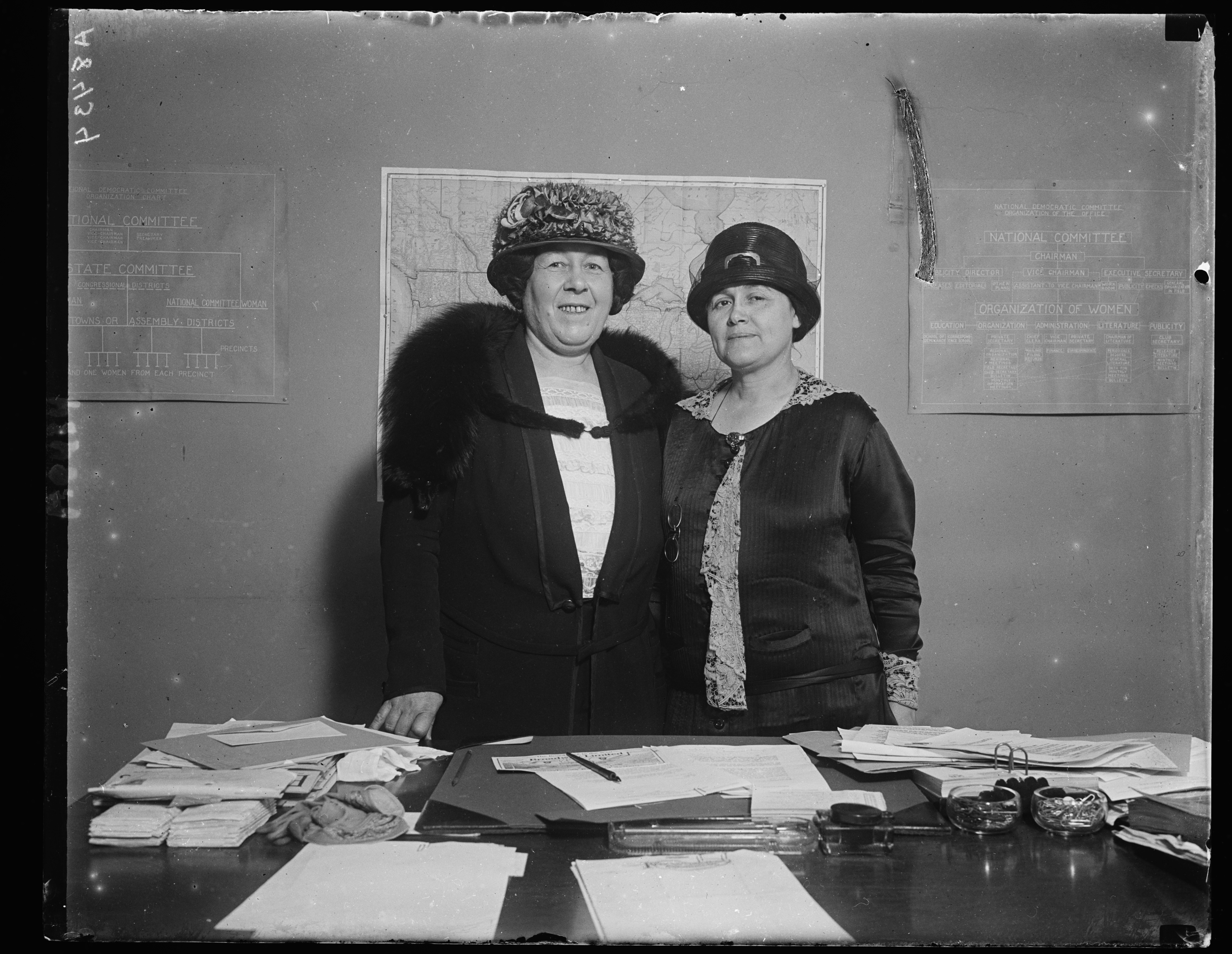
Emily Newell Blair, founder of the WNDC (right), with Mrs. D.A. McDougal

The WNDC was founded in 1922 by Emily Newell Blair and Daisy Harriman with the goal of garnering support for the Democratic party. One of the club's major goals was to keep the party active between campaigns.

Blair had previously been active in the Democratic National Convention's Women's Division. After John W. Davis lost the presidential election to Calvin Coolidge, the DNC closed its headquarters due to financial hardship. The WNDC provided support for the DNC by continuing to organize party activities, providing desk space, and storing DNC records.

The WNDC began hosting twice-weekly programs and events in 1924.

The WNDC's first meetings were held in Harriman's Georgetown home. The club's first dedicated space was located near The White House at 820 Connecticut Avenue, NW. In 1927, the WNDC moved into a home located at 1526 New Hampshire Avenue, NW in Washington's Dupont Circle neighborhood. The home was previously owned by Sarah Adams Whittemore, a descendant of John Adams, and is still known as the Whittemore House. The WNDC held a dedication ceremony at the property on May 10, 1927.

The WNDC offered membership for both Washington, DC residents and nonresidents. Eleanor Roosevelt was a nonresident member prior to becoming First Lady of the United States and remained an active member during her time in The White House and beyond. In the 1960s, Roosevelt delivered radio addresses for the club's library. The WNDC library and a club award are named in her honor.

Prior to the 1955–56 season, WNDC only accepted white members. Gladys Duncan, a community leader, teacher, and wife of singer Todd Duncan was the club's first black member. WMDC's first voting male member, Wynn Newman, joined in 1988. Men were only allowed to join as associate members up until that time.

The Whittemore House was added to the National Register of Historic Places in 1973.

== Present day ==
The WNDC continues to host programs or events twice each week when circumstances permit. Their headquarters is used for exhibitions and made available for community events. For example, in the months of June and July in 2026, the Club hosted Virginia's 43rd Lieutenant Governor Ghazala Hashmi, representative Delia Ramirez (D-IL), voting rights activist and former Georgia state representative Stacey Abrams, and leading feminist Heather Booth alongside Serra Sippel, executive director of The Brigid Alliance, Dr. Serina Floyd, chief medical officer at Planned Parenthood of Metropolitan Washington D.C., and Brittany Fonteno, CEO of the National Abortion Federation, all advocates for the right to secure and maintain women's reproductive rights.

The WNDC gives awards each year including the Eleanor Award and the Woman of the Year Award. Notable recipients of the Eleanor Award include Ruth Bader Ginsburg, Harry Belafonte, and Hillary Rodham Clinton. Clinton also received the Woman of the Year Award in 2017.

== WNDC Educational Foundation ==
The WNDC Educational Foundation, a nonprofit organization that hosts on-site events, encourages scholarly efforts, and manages outreach programs was founded in 1991.

== Notable members ==
- Anna Black Beers (1836-1933), widow of Donald A. McDonald
- Kay Shouse, first woman to chair the Federal Prison for Women Board
- Rose Frances Hull
- Eleanor Roosevelt
- Bess Truman
- Minnie Fisher Cunningham, suffragist
- Esther Peterson, American consumer and women's advocate
- Dorothy Vredenburgh Bush, American political activist, secretary of the Democratic National Committee
- Lindy Boggs, first woman elected to Congress from Louisiana
- India Edwards
- Edith Bolling
- Nellie Ross, 14th governor of Wyoming
- Eleanor Roosevelt Seagraves, American librarian, educator, historian, and editor
- Francis Perkins
- Muriel Humphrey
- Marjorie Merriweather Post
- Katie Louchheim
- Joan Mondale
