= Angel Face (1953 film) =

1953 film by Otto Preminger

- Theatrical release poster
- Directed by: Otto Preminger
- Screenplay by: Frank Nugent; Oscar Millard
- Story by: Chester Erskine
- Produced by: Otto Preminger
- Starring: Robert Mitchum; Jean Simmons
- Cinematography: Harry Stradling
- Edited by: Frederic Knudtson
- Music by: Dimitri Tiomkin (composed and conducted)
- Production company: RKO Radio Pictures
- Distributed by: RKO Radio Pictures
- Release dates: February 4, 1953 (Premiere – Los Angeles); February 11, 1953 (US)
- Running time: 91 minutes
- Country: United States
- Language: English
- Budget: $1,039,000

Angel Face is a 1953 American film noir directed by Otto Preminger, starring Robert Mitchum and Jean Simmons, and featuring Leon Ames and Barbara O'Neil.

Angel Face was produced under a tight 18-day schedule beginning in June 1952, with a budget under $1 million. Preminger, reportedly hired by Howard Hughes to pressure Simmons over contract disputes, clashed with both Simmons and Mitchum while filming on location in Beverly Hills, California. During one scene, Mitchum famously slapped Preminger after repeated takes. Despite on-set conflicts, Simmons later recalled enjoying the film. The film was released on February 11, 1953. Critics praised the film's stylistic rigor and psychological depth. Alain Silver highlighted its exploration of destructive sexuality through Preminger's visual composition and Mitchum's performance. Jean-Luc Godard ranked it among the top American sound films.

== Plot ==
Frank Jessup is an ambulance driver who dreams of running his own repair shop for sportscars. One evening, while responding to an emergency call at a posh estate, he meets beautiful heiress Diane Tremayne. Intrigued, Diane devises a series of seemingly happenstance meetings with Frank, and a relationship between them ensues. As a result, Frank alienates his girlfriend, Mary Wilton. When the Tremayne family offers Frank a job as chauffeur, with his own rooms on the estate, he accepts.

One afternoon, as Diane's father and stepmother start their car to drive to town, their vehicle mysteriously reverses when geared to drive forward. It careens backward down a steep cliff, killing both occupants. As Diane is the sole heir to their fortune, she comes under suspicion for murder. Frank is also suspected of having tampered with the vehicle's transmission. Fred Barrett, their defense attorney, persuades them to marry to curry the jury's favor. Frank is reluctant but consents.

The prosecuting attorney has no concrete evidence, so Frank and Diane are found not guilty. Afterwards, Frank tells Diane he is ending their sham marriage. He tries to make up with his ex-girlfriend Mary, but she wants nothing to do with him. Diane, overcome with a sense of guilt, sees her lawyer, Barrett, and tells him she wishes to confess to the murder of her parents. However, Barrett informs her that, under the law, she cannot be tried again for the same crime. Later, Frank returns to the Tremayne estate to retrieve his belongings. He had arranged for a taxi beforehand, but Diane offers to drive him to the station. He accepts. After putting the car in gear, Diane intentionally accelerates backwards, violently crashing down the cliff, killing them both.

== Cast ==
- Robert Mitchum as Frank Jessup
- Jean Simmons as Diane Tremayne
- Mona Freeman as Mary Wilton
- Herbert Marshall as Charles Tremayne, Diane's father
- Leon Ames as Fred Barrett, Frank and Diane's defense attorney
- Barbara O'Neil as Catherine Tremayne, Diane's stepmother
- Kenneth Tobey as Bill, Frank's fellow ambulance driver
- Raymond Greenleaf as Arthur Vance, Catherine Tremayne's estate attorney
- Griff Barnett as the judge
- Robert Gist as Miller, the forensic expert on automobile mechanics
- Morgan Farley as a juror who asks two questions during the trial
- Jim Backus as Judson, the district attorney prosecuting Frank and Diane
- Frank Kumagai as Ito, the Tremaynes' butler

== Production ==
Turner Classic Movies host Eddie Muller reported that RKO studio boss Howard Hughes hired director Otto Preminger expressly for the purpose of torturing Jean Simmons because she did not intend to renew her contract with RKO. During her interview with Muller for TCM, she had to leave the screening room rather than continue watching the movie, due to the targeted harassment she remembered experiencing during production, and even pre-production, when she took a pair of scissors to her hair after endless hairstyle changes (resulting in a $500 wig budget in the final movie). However, according to Simmons' husband Stewart Granger, "she enjoyed the film. She adored Mitchum and used to tell me what a good actor he was." Robert Mitchum was also reputed to have had a difficult working relationship with Preminger on the set.

Production began on June 18, 1952, with a budget of under $1,000,000 and a production schedule of just 18 days because of cinematographer Harry Stradling's reputation for quick work. Principal photography ended in mid-July 1952, and editing and post-production were completed by the end of September. Previews were held in early December 1952, with notices appearing throughout the month in Box Office, The Film Daily, The Hollywood Reporter, Motion Picture Herald and Variety.

Early in the film, there is a scene where the script called for Robert Mitchum to slap a hysterical Jean Simmons across the face. Because of Preminger's dissatisfaction with Simmons' reactions, the scene required multiple takes before Mitchum finally became fed up. When Preminger again called "Once more!", Mitchum spun around, faced Preminger, and shouted, "Once more?" He then slapped Preminger's face, hard. The director quickly retreated from the set, demanding Mitchum be fired. But instead, "he was told to go back and finish shooting the picture".

The film was released on February 11, 1953.

== Reception ==
In his review for The New York Times, critic Howard Thompson described Angel Face as a frustrating mix of real talent, occasional insight, and tedious psychological nonsense. He stated that a promising and tightly woven story idea had been lost in a pretentious Freudian haze, which permeated the beautifully presented film and led to disastrous outcomes. The film's baffling character motivations, deliberately perplexing events, and wandering pace were peculiar and undermined its overall quality. Furthermore, the incredibly gloomy ending served as a fittingly disappointing conclusion to everything that came before.

Dave Kehr from the Chicago Reader wrote in 1985: "This intense Freudian melodrama by Otto Preminger (1953) is one of the forgotten masterworks of film noir... The film is a disturbingly cool, rational investigation of the terrors of sexuality...The sets, characters, and actions are extremely stylized, yet Preminger's moving camera gives them a frightening unity and fluidity, tracing a straight, clean line to a cliff top for one of the most audacious endings in film history." Film noir historian Alain Silver wrote: "In Otto Preminger’s work sexuality may be either therapeutic or destructive. Angel Face epitomizes the latter quality.... Preminger does not suggest that Frank is a hapless victim. Rather his mise-en-scène, which repeatedly frames the figures in obliquely angled medium shots against the depth of field created by the expensive furnishings of the Tremayne mansion, and Mitchum’s subdued portrayal engender an atmosphere of fatality."

Shortly before his death, critic Robin Wood named Angel Face as one of his top 10 films.

In 1963, Jean-Luc Godard listed Angel Face as the eighth-best American sound film.

On Rotten Tomatoes, 77% of 13 reviews of the film are positive.
