= Richard Crossfield =

Minister for Disciples of Christ and university administrator

Richard Henry Crossfield, Jr.
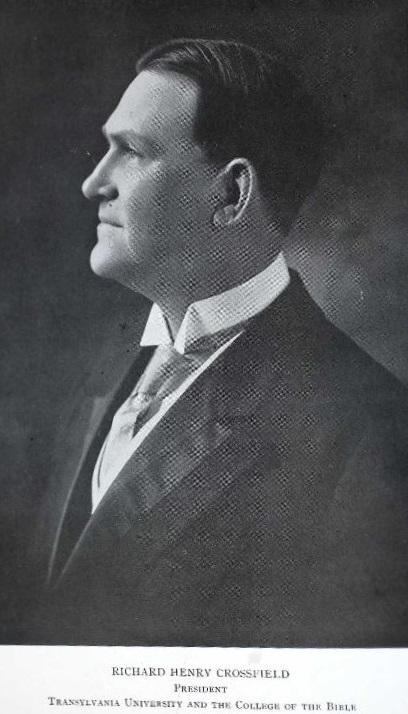
- Born: October 22, 1868; Lawrenceburg, Kentucky, US
- Died: July 30, 1951; Birmingham, Alabama, US
- Occupation(s): university president, minister
- Known for: Educational leadership and ministry in Christian Church (Disciples of Christ)
- Spouse: Anne "Annie" Ritchie Terry (1870-1958)

Richard Henry Crossfield Jr. (October 22, 1868 – July 30, 1951) was a leader in the Christian Church (Disciples of Christ) as a minister, theologian and an educational reformer. He was installed as president of Transylvania College in Lexington, Kentucky in 1908 and then oversaw its merger with the College of the Bible in 1912, which created the Transylvania University. In 1922, Crossfield became president of another Christian Church-affiliated school, William Woods College of Missouri. He was a member of the Board of Education of the Disciples of Christ, served as Executive Secretary of the ecumenical and pro-temperance Federal Council of Churches of Christ in America, and a member of the American Academy of Political and Social Science.

== Early life and family ==
Richard H. Crossfield Jr. was the youngest son of a large, blended family. His father Richard Henry Crossfield (1821–1908) was a politician who served three terms as sheriff, county judge for four years, and in 1891 elected state Representative for Anderson County, Kentucky. His mother Elizabeth Ann Jackson Crossfield (1837–1908) was Crossfield's second wife who had four of a total of twelve siblings raised there.

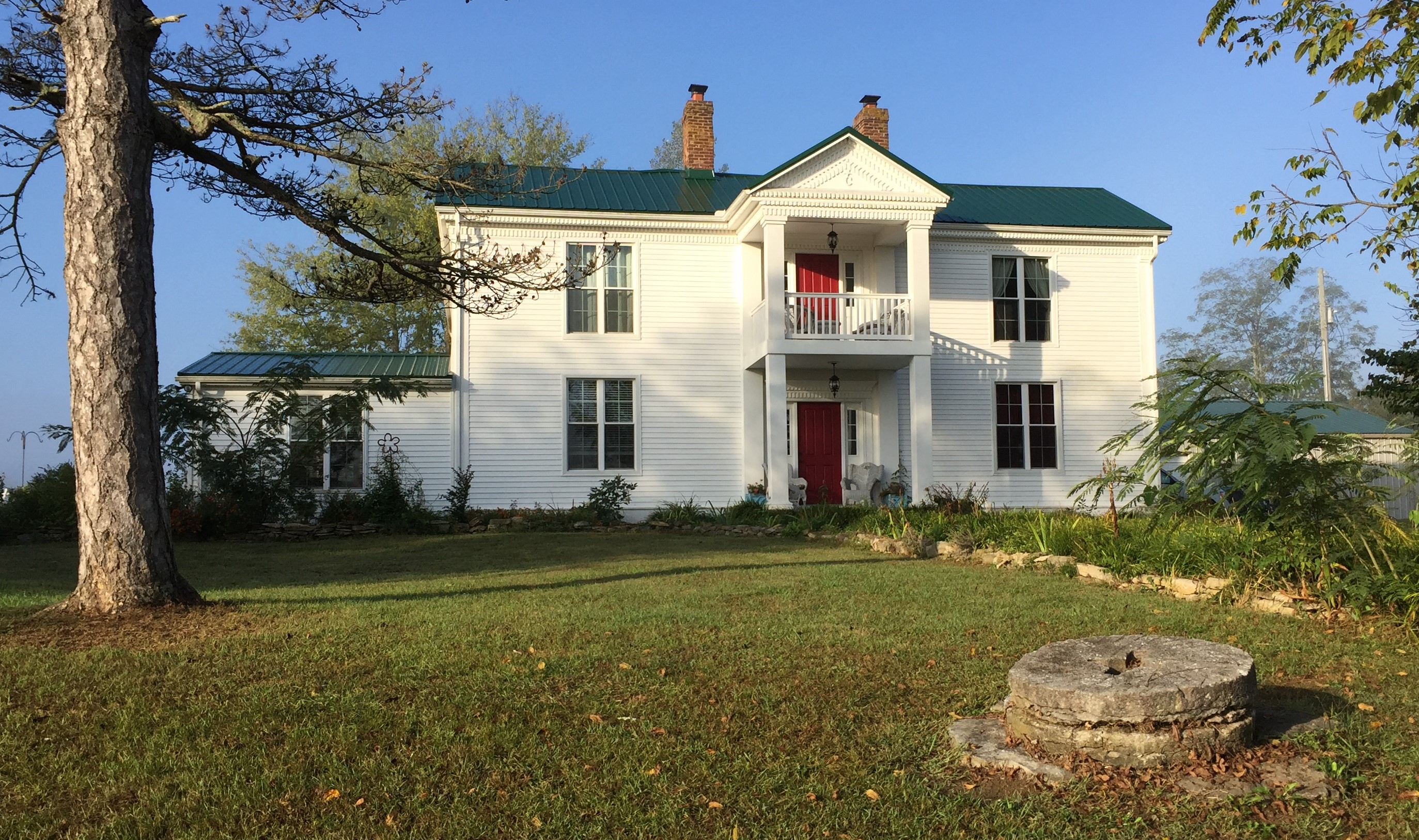
The R.H. Crossfield House on Anderson City Road near Lawrenceburg KY

Crossfield grew up on a large farm in the house built by his father near Fox Creek in Anderson County. Studying in the College of the Bible, he earned an A.B. degree from Kentucky University in 1889. Then, he attended Wooster College where he earned an M.A. then a Ph.D. in 1900. During this time he wrote about his international travels: Pilgrimages of a Parson; an account of experiences and adventures in Europe, Egypt and Palestine (published in 1901). He had been ordained a minister of the Disciples of Christ in 1894.

He married Anne Ritchie "Annie" Terry (February 28, 1870- October 13, 1958) from Cave City, Kentucky on February 5, 1895. He served as a pastor for the First Christian Church in Glasgow, Kentucky then the First Christian Church of Owensboro, Kentucky. In Owensboro, they had three children: Jeanette, who died of pneumonia at the age of four; Dorothy Crossfield Atkins (1904–1981); and, Charles Terry Crossfield (1907–1962).

== Career ==
Crossfield was installed as president of Transylvania College in 1908. By 1912, he was president of the combined schools of Transylvania University, which included the College of the Bible (later Lexington Theological Seminary) and Hamilton Female College (which had been incorporated into Transylvania since 1903).

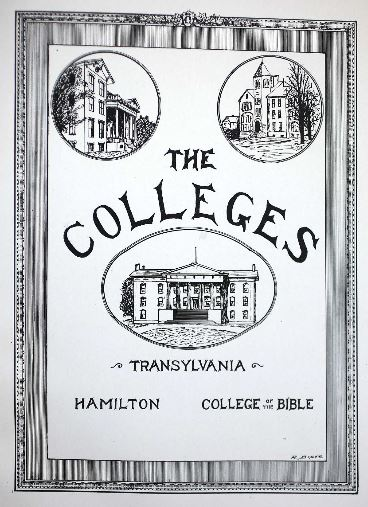
The Crimson, 1914

In 1915 at the state convention of the Christian Church of Kentucky, Crossfield presented a resolution endorsing woman suffrage, which was unanimously passed by the convention.

"Whereas, the principle of equal suffrage is founded on justice and righteousness and has been a mighty factor in the elimination of the open saloon, gambling, the white slave traffic and other forms of crime and vice, where women have been given the franchise. Therefore, be it resolved that we, both Christian and Democratic, endorse the principle of equal suffrage as both Christian and Democratic and one that should prevail in the nation."

The resolution reflects the strong influence of the social creeds adopted in 1908 by the members of the Federal Council of Churches of Christ in America.

In May 1916, Crossfield encouraged his faculty and students to participate in a suffrage parade in Lexington—and he himself marched as part of a contingent called the "Men's League for Women Suffrage."

He was appointed president of the women's junior college, William Woods College of Missouri in 1921. Then, in 1924 he moved to Norfolk, Virginia to serve as a pastor there until he was called to the First Christian Church in Birmingham, Alabama in 1927. He was later recruited back to Lexington, Kentucky to serve for a year as president of Transylvania University, 1938–1939.

== Death ==
Crossfield died in Birmingham, Alabama on July 30, 1951. He is buried in the Glasgow Municipal Cemetery in Kentucky.

== Honors and legacy ==
Crossfield was awarded the status of president emeritus upon his retirement in 1940. He was awarded the honorary degree of LL.D. by Georgetown College in 1915, the University of Kentucky in 1917, and in 1930 from Transylvania University.

Upon his death in 1951, a R.H. Crossfield Scholarship Fund was created for Transylvania University.
