= David O'Neil =

American poet

- Born: July 23, 1874
- Died: June 9, 1947 (aged 72)

David N. O'Neil (July 23, 1874 - June 9, 1947), also known as Dave O'Neil, was an American businessman and poet of the early 20th century. He was also an occasional stage actor. In 1937, he built an outdoor theatre on his estate in Cos Cob, Connecticut for his family to use, which is known as the O'Neil Outdoor Theatre.

== Life and career ==
O'Neil was born in St. Louis, Missouri, the son of Joseph and Catherine O'Neil. He received the LL.B. from the law school in Washington University in St. Louis. He became president of the O'Neil Lumber Company in 1908 and soon retired a very wealthy man at age 48, and moved with his family to Paris.

O'Neil and his wife were close friends of Ernest Hemingway and his first wife, Hadley. They had known O'Neil from St. Louis, and Hemingway wrote an acidulous sketch based on O'Neil. O'Neil published only one volume of poems, 1918's A Cabinet of Jade, the title suggested by Zoë Akins. He also contributed to a number of influential poetry reviews of the day, including The Little Review and Poetry. He co-edited the 1923 book, Today's Poetry: An Anthology, with Nelson Crawford.

He married the former Barbara Blackman on June 10, 1903. She was a socialite and suffragist, the daughter of George and Carrie (Horton) Blackman. Their daughter was actress Barbara O'Neil.

== Works ==
- David O'Neil (2007) [1918]. A Cabinet Of Jade. Kessinger Publishing, LLC. ISBN 978-0-548-33510-9.
