= Hamilton College (Kentucky) =

Private women's college in Lexington, Kentucky, US

Coordinates: 38°03′18.6″N 84°29′30.6″W

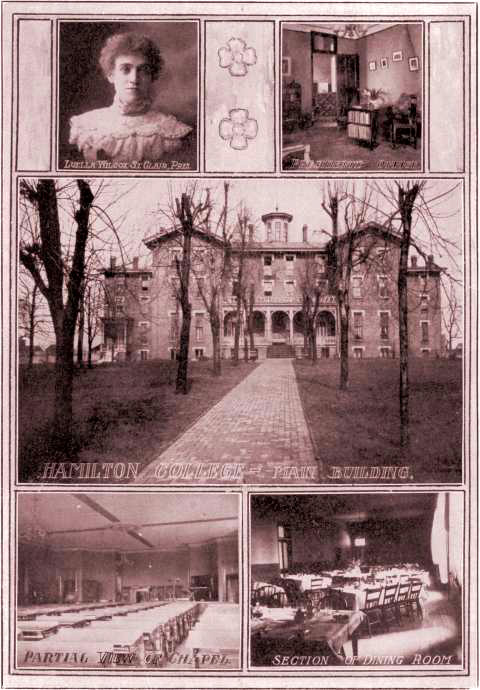
Photos of Hamilton College, 1904

Hamilton College was a private women's college in Lexington, Kentucky, operating from 1869 to 1932. It was taken over in 1903 by Transylvania University and operated as an affiliated junior college until its closing during the Great Depression.

== History ==
Hamilton was founded by banker James M. Hocker in 1869 as the Hocker Female College. In 1878, a substantial donation by William Hamilton was recognized by the school changing its name to Hamilton College. In 1889, the nearby Kentucky University, which later changed names to Transylvania University, bought a stake in Hamilton, taking total control in 1903.

The school became a junior college for women, the state's first, still with its own president and faculty, though affiliated with Transylvania. By 1912, under the leadership of Dr. Richard Henry Crossfield Jr., Transylvania incorporated the College of the Bible (later Lexington Theological Seminary) - also affiliated with the Disciples of Christ.

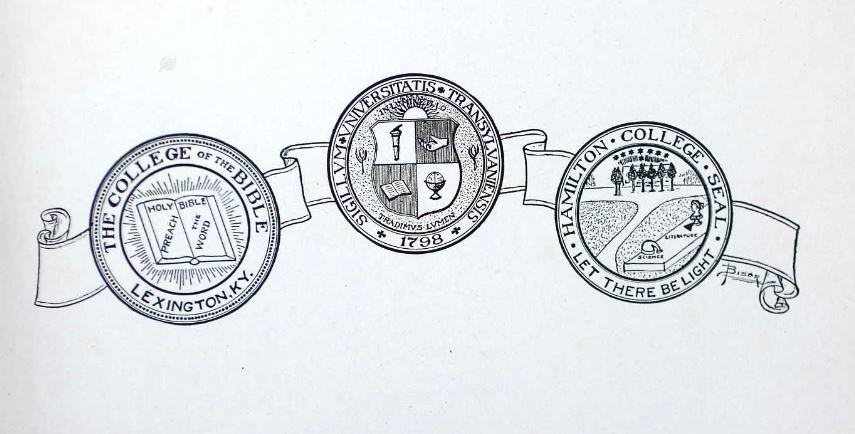
Seals of The College of Bible, Transylvania University, and Hamilton College in Lexington, Kentucky - merged in 1912

Under Crossfield's leadership, Transylvania continued to gather up new faculty and students through assimilation with struggling private schools around the state, including Bourbon Female College in Paris, Kentucky.

The school closed in 1932, during the Great Depression, when the number of students declined.

== Campus ==
The main building was used as a women's dormitory for students at Transylvania until it was demolished in 1962.

The only remaining building from Hamilton College is the Graham Cottage Alumni House, the alumni reception center on the Transylvania campus. Built in 1863 for James M. Hocker, it was acquired by the college in 1869 as a residence for Robert Graham, its first president.

== Student life ==
The college had a chapter of Sigma Iota Chi and Sigma Sigma Omicron sororities from the 1920s until the college closed.

== Notable people ==
Some presidents of Hamilton College were:

- Robert Graham (founding president of Hocker Female College in 1869) Graham took on this role after leaving his previous position as the president of Kentucky University's College of Arts and Sciences.
- Dr. John Thomas Patterson (served as president from 1876 until he retired sixteen years later)
- Josiah Burnsides Skinner (1848–1898)
- Barton Campbell Hagerman (president from 1898 to 1902 whereupon he started his own rival college for women four blocks away, the Campbell-Hagerman College)
- Luella W. St. Clair (later Moss, was recruited from Christian College in Columbia, Missouri, serving as president from 1903 to 1909 when she returned to her previous appointment in Missouri)
- Dr. Hubert Gibson Shearin (1909–1914)
- Ida Van Arsdell Thomson (1914–1918)
- Errett W. McDiarmid (1918)
- Thomas A. Hendricks

A notable alumna of Hamilton was Maurine Dallas Watkins, the journalist and playwright who wrote the play Chicago (1926). It served as the basis for the musical of the same name, first produced in 1975. Another notable alumna was actress Isabel Jewell, who played the seamstress in A Tale of Two Cities (1935) and Emmy Slattery in Gone with the Wind (1939).

== See also ==
- List of current and historical women's universities and colleges
