= Campbell–Hagerman College =

Women's college in Lexington, Kentucky (1903–1912)

Campbell-Hagerman College
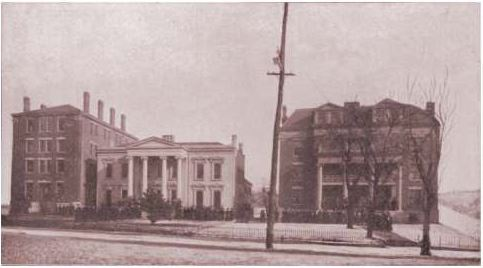
- Type: Private liberal arts college Women's college
- Active: 1903–1912
- Religious affiliation: Christian Church (Disciples of Christ)
- President: Barton Campbell Hagerman (1853-1922)
- Location: Lexington, Kentucky, U.S.

Campbell–Hagerman College was a private, women's college located in Lexington, Kentucky. Affiliated with the Disciples of Christ, the school was founded in 1903. It closed in June 1912.

== History ==
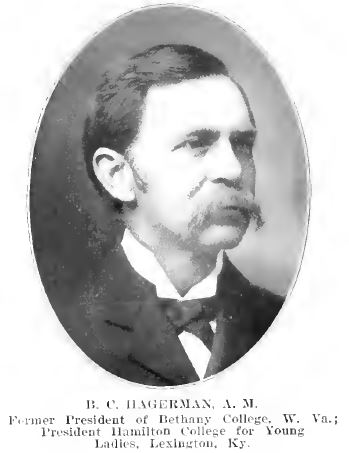

Campbell–Hagerman College was a private, women's college that opened in 1903 in Lexington, Kentucky. It was affiliated with the Disciples of Christ. The college was established by Barton Campbell Hagerman, former president of Hamilton College in Lexington, Kentucky from 1898 to 1902. He was supported in this endeavor by his wife, Mary Anna "Mamie" Campbell Hagerman, the granddaughter of Alexander Campbell, founder of the Disciples of Christ or Christian Church. Hagerman worked for a year to build two new buildings on either side of a mansion he planned to turn into a classroom building. On May 2, 1903, they held an opening ceremony for the new college for women. All the local college presidents and several ministers attended the ceremony and spoke of their support. Hagerman announced that the new college was to be named Campbell–Hagerman College in honor of his wife who would be sharing "in the cares and duties of its conduct."

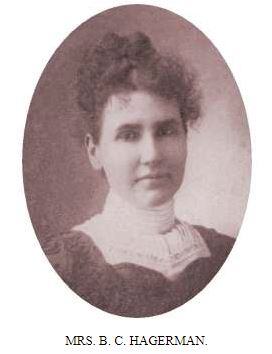
Mary Anna "Mamie" Campbell Hagerman

After the unexpected death of Mamie Hagerman in May 1912, her husband announced that he would not reopen the school in the fall. His announcement explained that the school would be discontinued "on account of the recent death of his wife who actively aided in the direction of the school." Hagerman decided that the two newer buildings would be converted into "residence apartments".

== Campus ==
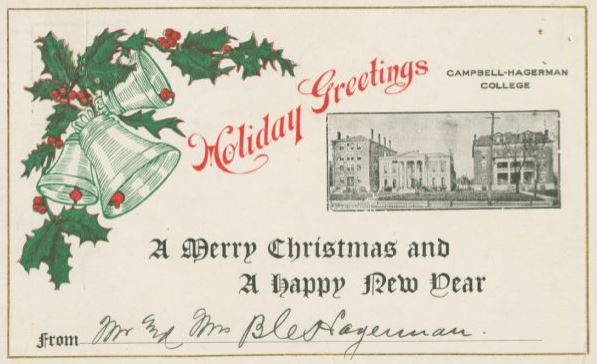
1911 Holiday Greetings card from Mr. and Mrs. B.C. Hagerman, Campbell-Hagerman College

The campus was located at the north-west edge of the center of Lexington, Kentucky on Second Street, four blocks from Hamilton College. Hagerman built the administrative building to the left of the classroom building, and the dormitory, called Argyle Hall, on the right. The women boarding students and the Hagermans lived in Argyle Hall in the top four floors. The large basement was the kitchen and cafeteria.

== Academics ==
=== Curriculum ===
The curriculum included schools of Music, Art, Elocution, Domestic Science, and Business courses. The college also offered gymnasium, tennis, basketball, and golf. In 1905, the college graduate 32 students in the Opera House in Lexington.

=== Faculty ===
By 1905, the college had 21 teachers. Mary E. Sweeney taught physics and chemistry at Campbell-Hagerman College before she worked at the University of Kentucky.

Barton Campbell Hagerman was from Shelby County, Kentucky and graduated from the Bible College of Kentucky University (now Transylvania University) in June 1874. He then attended Bethany College in West Virginia, graduating in 1876. He stayed there to teach Greek, and he married a Bethany College graduate Mamie Campbell on 11 September 1883. Hagerman brought his family with him to Richmond, Kentucky in 1885 where he served as president of the Madison Female Institute for five years. After a brief trip to California for health reasons, he taught Latin at Kentucky University (now Transylvania University). He was recruited in 1897 to be the sixth president of Bethany College, and was hired a year later as president of Hamilton College.

== Student life ==
The college had a chapter of Sigma Iota Chi sorority from 1907 to 1911.

== See also ==
- Bethany College (West Virginia)
- Hamilton College (Kentucky)
- Madison Female Institute
- Kentucky's List of current and historical women's universities and colleges in the U.S.

== Additional resources ==
- "Deaths". The Richmond (Ky.) Climax. Chronicling America: Historic American Newspapers, Lib. of Congress. 8 May 1912.
- "God's Richest Blessings, invoked upon his school -- beautiful ceremonies at cornerstone laying of Hagerman College". The Lexington (Ky.) Morning Democrat. No. 122. 2 May 1903.
- "Mrs. B.C. Hagerman passes away in Chicago". The Courier-Journal. 4 May 1912.
- Brown, John T., ed. (1904). Churches of Christ: A Historical, Biographical, and Pictorial History of Churches of Christ in the United States, Australasia, England, and Canada. Louisville, KY: John P. Morton and Company. pp. 392, 294.
- Cummins, D. Duane (1987). The Disciples Colleges: A History. St. Louis, Missouri: CBP Press.
- La Bree, Ben., ed. (1902). Notable Men of Kentucky at the Beginning of the 20th Century (1901-1902). Louisville, Ky.: Geo. G. Fetter Printing Co. p. 33.
