= Barbara Blackman O'Neil =

American suffragist (1880–1963)

- Born: September 17, 1880
- Died: December 2, 1963 (aged 83)
- Education: Washington University in St. Louis
- Occupation: Suffragist
- Family: Barbara O'Neil (daughter)

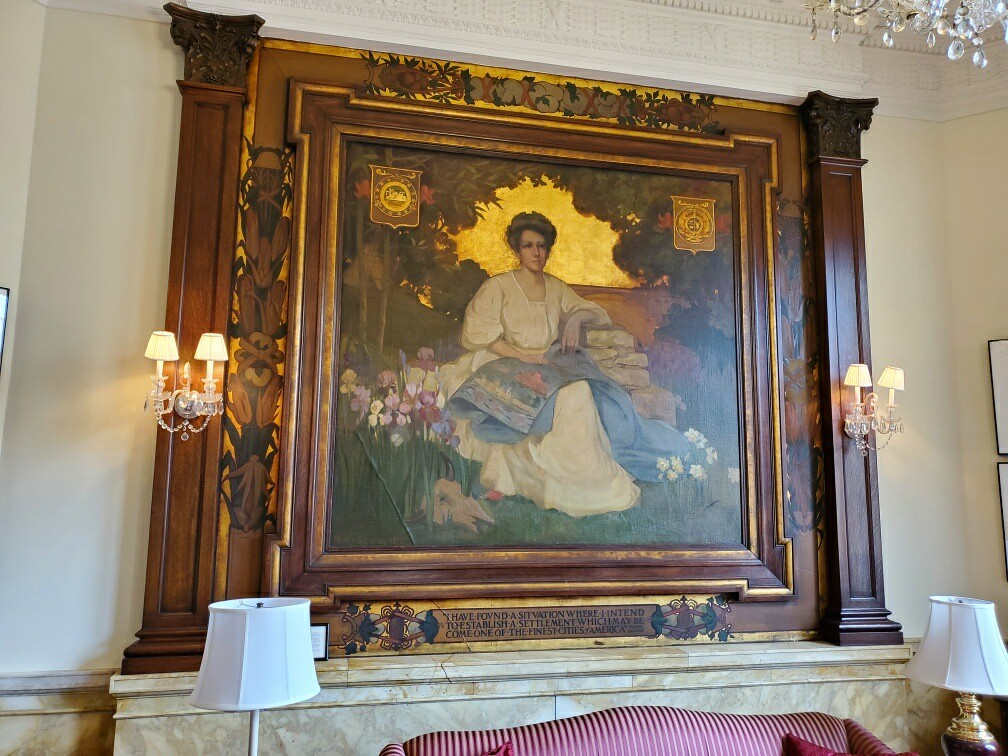
Portrait of Barbara Blackman O'Neil by Frederick Lincoln Stoddard in the St. Louis Mayor's Office

Barbara Blackman O'Neil (September 3, 1880 – December 2, 1963) was an American suffrage leader in St. Louis, Missouri. She was born in 1880. Her father was George Blackman. She attended Washington University, where she studied art. O'Neil was elected the second president of the Equal Suffrage League. She later became president again following the resignation of Mrs. John L. Lowes.

She spoke in defense of Jane Addams and against the National Women Suffrage Association adopting an amendment that would prohibit any officer or member from participating in a major political party in 1912. She was elected to the board of directors of College Suffragist, part of the National Women Suffrage Association, at that time. She led the Equal Suffrage League to try to get suffrage to go to Missouri voters in 1914, but when the state senate tabled the discussion, she and Mrs. Walter McNab Miller, the state Equal Suffrage League president, started a petition campaign. The measure failed at a rate of nearly 3 to 1 statewide. At the 1916 Democratic National Convention, when thousands of women took to the streets to draw attention to suffrage, O'Neil stood at the end of a "golden lane" of women representing states with full suffrage, where she was dressed as a "spirit of liberty."

== Personal life and death ==
A portrait of O'Neil painted in 1902 by F.L. Stoddard hung in the office of the mayor of St. Louis for many years. She married David O'Neil, a businessman and poet, in 1903. They had four children: David Blackman, who died as a child; George Blackman; Horton; and Barbara, a film and stage actress. O'Neil and her husband moved from St. Louis around or after 1919, first to Europe, then to California, and eventually Cos Cob, Connecticut. O'Neil died on December 2, 1963, at age 82. She was buried in Greenwich, Connecticut.
