= Julia Shipley Carroll =

American magazine editor (1887–1960)

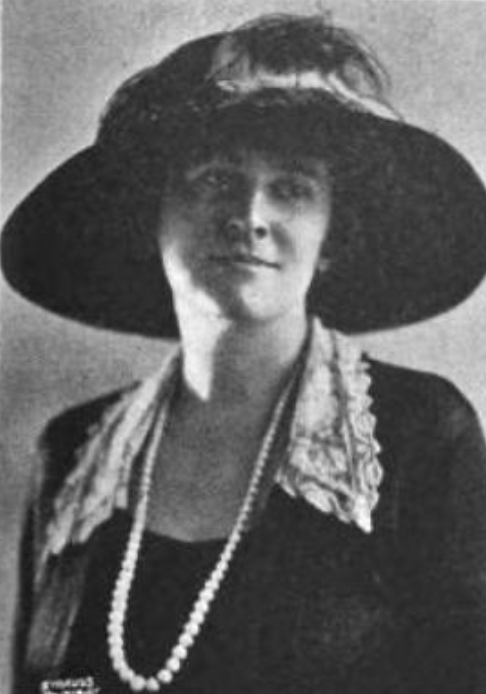
- Carroll in a 1921 publication
- Born: Julia Taylor Shipley; February 3, 1887; St. Louis, Missouri, US
- Died: August 28, 1960 (aged 73); Elk Rapids, Michigan, US
- Other names: Julia S. Pollister (after second marriage)
- Occupation(s): Magazine editor, business manager, clubwoman

Julia Shipley Carroll (February 3, 1887 – August 28, 1960), later Julia S. Pollister, was an American suffragist, clubwoman, magazine editor, and business manager. She was president of the Women's Advertising Club of St. Louis, Missouri.

== Early life ==
Julia Taylor Shipley was born in St. Louis, the daughter of Mark A. Shipley and Julia Taylor Johnson Shipley. Her father was an insurance investigator. She came from a prominent family. Ambassador Henry Taylor Blow was her great-grandfather; his daughter, educator Susan Blow, was her great-aunt, and lawyer Charles Phillip Johnson was her great-uncle.

== Career ==
Carroll was business manager of Missouri Woman, a pro-suffrage magazine. She was fashion editor of The Drygoodsman, a weekly national trade publication, from 1919 to 1922. In 1920, she helped raise funds for the YWCA to build temporary housing for "working girls". Also in 1920, she ran for president of the Town Club. In 1921, she staged a fashion show in Columbia.

Shipley was a charter member of the Women's Advertising Club of St. Louis. She represented the club at the Associated Advertising Clubs of the World's national meeting in Atlanta in 1919. She was elected president of the club in 1921, and represented the club at the national Associated Advertising Clubs meeting in Milwaukee in 1922, soon after she remarried. In 1930, she was one of the past presidents to attend the club's charter presentation ceremony, after the Advertising Federation of America was organized. In 1941, she was honored with other past presidents at the club's silver jubilee celebration.

In her later years in Michigan, Pollister remained active in women's club events.

== Personal life ==
Julia Shipley married Walter C. Carroll. They had a son, Briggs, before they divorced in 1910. In 1922, she remarried, to businessman and engineer Edward Barker Pollister. They had a son, Edward Jr. She was widowed when Edward died in 1954; she died in 1960, aged 73 years, at a hospital in Elk Rapids, Michigan.
