= Emily Newell Blair =

American writer and suffragist (1877–1951)

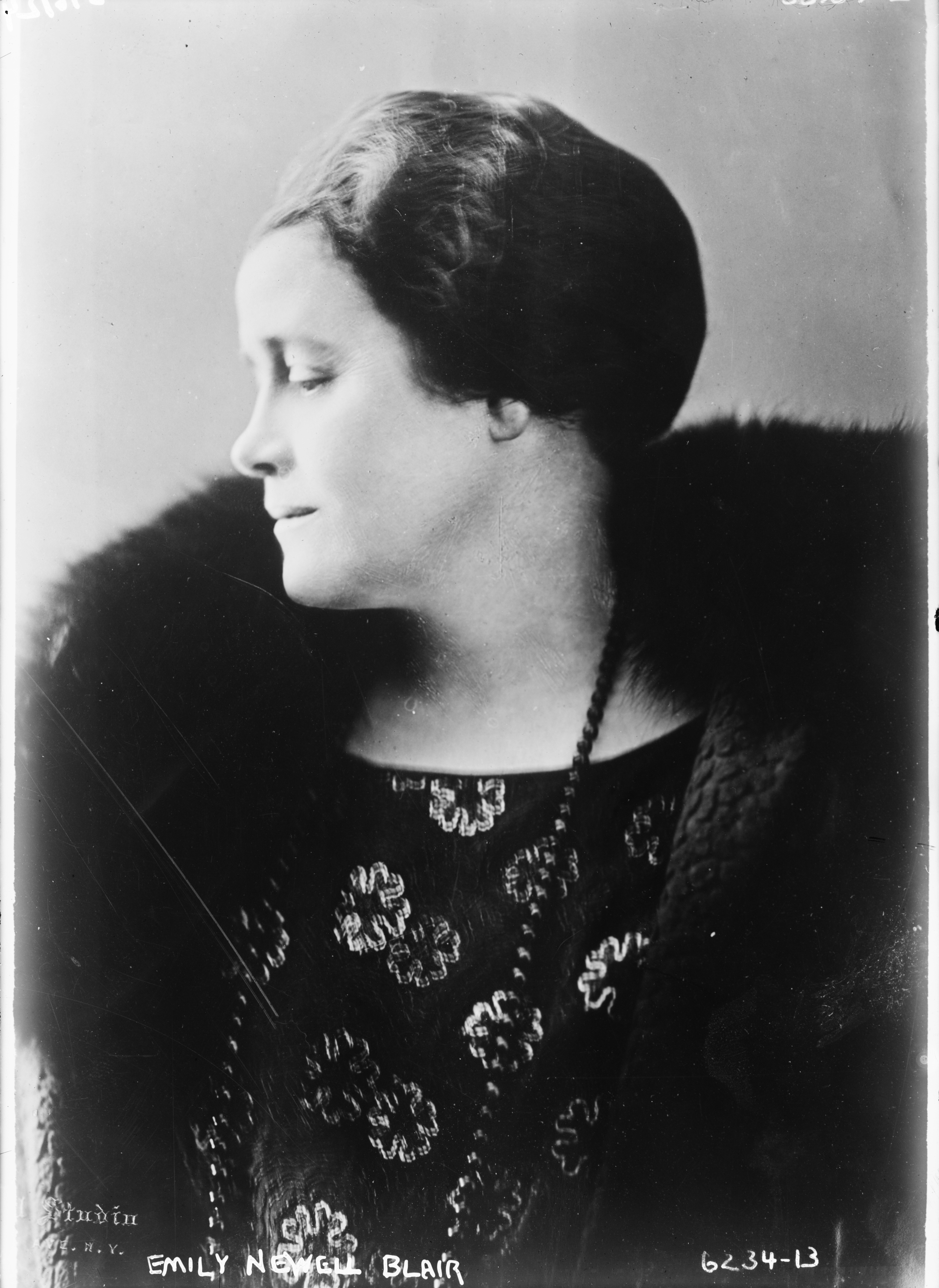
- Born: Emily Jane Newell; January 9, 1877; Joplin, Missouri
- Died: August 3, 1951 (aged 74); Alexandria, Virginia
- Education: Goucher College; University of Missouri
- Occupations: Writer, suffragist, feminist and Democratic Party political leader.
- Known for: Founder of the League of Women Voters
- Political party: Democratic
- Movement: Women's suffrage
- Spouse: Harry Wallace Blair
- Children: Newell Blair; Harriet Blair

Emily Newell Blair (January 9, 1877 – August 3, 1951) was an American writer, suffragist, feminist, national Democratic Party political leader, and a founder of the League of Women Voters.

== Biography ==
=== Early life and ancestors ===
Emily Jane Newell Blair was born in Joplin, Jasper County, Missouri, on January 9, 1877, and died August 3, 1951, in Alexandra, Arlington County, Virginia. She was a daughter of James Patton Newell and Anna Cynthia Gray.

As a child, Emily was an avid reader, and, from a young age, a talented writer. She was an assertive child and thought that she was not especially popular with her classmates or teachers. To compensate, she excelled in her schoolwork and was known to be the leader of her siblings at home.

Her father, a native of Franklin, Venango County, Pennsylvania, as a young man, made a fortune in lumber and oil. Unfortunately, he explored for more oil and lost the fortune. He removed to Joplin, Missouri, around 1874 with his lawyer's license. He was an investor in the local lead mine in Joplin. He also served as the county clerk for Joplin. In 1883, he was elected as Jasper County recorder of deeds, and then he moved his family to Carthage, fifteen miles away from Joplin. He had also served in the 30th Iowa Volunteer Infantry as a lieutenant in the Civil War.

Her mother, Anna Cynthia Gray, was a daughter of Elisha Burritt Gray and Margaretta Rachel McDowell. She was a great granddaughter of the Rev. Blackleach Burritt and a descendant of Governor Thomas Welles and Rev. John Lothropp. Her sister, Margaretta Josephine Gray, was married to Henry Seymour Church; they were the parents of Katherine Gray Church, who married Theodore Solomons, an explorer and early member of the Sierra Club.

Emily wrote of her mother:

When she moved from Franklin, Venango County, Pennsylvania to the mining camps in Joplin, Missouri she brought her books and her silver-bound writing desk. She kept up her French reading, made out a study course, and practiced daily on the hotel piano. She did such things until her death. At sixty, she was taking an extension course from the University of Chicago, and she played the organ at church until her death. When she died at age seventy-two, her Spanish textbook was found open on the table.

=== Education ===
She was an 1894 graduate of Carthage Senior High School. She was educated at Goucher College and the University of Missouri. She returned to Carthage upon her father's death, before graduating, to help support and care for her brother and three sisters.

=== Marriage and family ===
She married on December 24, 1900, at Carthage to Harry Wallace Blair, the son of John Blair and Mary Jane Plttenger. He was born on July 7, 1877, at Maryville, Missouri, and died at Alexandria, Arlington County, Virginia, in 1964. He was a 1904 graduate of the George Washington University Law School.

While attending law school, he worked as a secretary for Secretary of Labor and Commerce George B. Cortelyou. During World War I, he served in France with the YMCA. After the war, he returned to the U.S. and from 1919 to 1933, practiced law in Joplin, Missouri. He was an active member of the Oxford Group (known as Moral Re-Armament from 1938 until 2001, and as Initiatives of Change since then) founded by Dr. Frank N.D. Buchman.

He was appointed in 1933 as an Assistant U.S. Attorney General overseeing the United States Department of Justice Environment and Natural Resources Division under Attorney General Homer Cummings. After serving as Assistant U.S. Attorney General, he served as a special assistant to the Attorney General for several years, and then went into private practice in Washington, D.C., with his son, Newell Blair. From 1947 until 1950, Mr. Blair served on a regional loyalty board, and from 1950 to 1953 served on the President's Loyalty Review Board, which reviewed federal agency loyalty board determinations regarding whether federal workers were pro-communist. He retired in 1962.

They were the parents of two children. Their son Newell Blair attended Yale University and graduated from the University of the South in 1929. He received his law degree from Washington University School of Law at Washington University in St. Louis in 1932. He was a Washington lawyer and businessman who was the founder of three legal newsletters. Their daughter, Harriet Blair was the wife of Newton Melville Forsythe.

=== Career ===
Blair became active in the local suffragist campaign. In 1914, she became publicity chair for the Missouri Equal Suffrage Association and the first editor of its monthly publication, Missouri Woman.

After the United States' entry into World War I, Blair became vice chair of the Missouri Woman's Committee of the Council of Defense. When her husband went abroad for the YMCA, she accepted a position in the publicity department of the Women's Committee of the Council of National Defense, working for Ida M. Tarbell. and Anna Howard Shaw. In 1920, Blair published its history, "The Women's Committee, U.S. Council of National Defense: An Interpretive Report".

She had been a founder of the League of Women Voters, but realized that since gaining suffrage, women had lost political clout. Although they had the right to vote, they tended not to vote in blocks. Women must, Blair contended, organize and support strong women candidates for office who could lead the demand for equality. As a result, she organized more than 2,000 Democratic women's clubs around the country and built regional training programs for women party workers. She first served as secretary (1922–1926) and then later as president (1928–1929) of the Woman's National Democratic Club, and was the club's principal founder.

She was the first woman to attain a prominent position in Democratic party politics, serving as the national vice chairwoman of the Democratic Party. She was first elected in 1922 and reelected in 1924 and served until 1928. During her tenure, she worked to elect women to public office.

During her tenure as national vice chairwoman, she was continually seeking Democratic support in Congress for issues in which women were interested. The United States Children's Bureau created by President William Howard Taft in 1912, was of interest to all women and worked for support for it from Democrats.

She started meeting with then Congressman, later Speaker of the House, Sam Rayburn of Texas to gather support. As a bachelor, she approached him with some trepidation but as they spoke he became greatly interested in the importance of The Children's Bureau and was very helpful with gathering Democratic support in Congress for the Bureau. Afterward, she went to him often for advice and assistance.

Years later she recalled that she ran into him at a Washington, D.C., restaurant shortly after the Roosevelt administration came into power, he came across the room to her table and asked her what she wanted in the way of an appointment. When she told him nothing, that already she had had all she wanted from politics – much fun and work and many fine friends, he replied: "Well, if you change your mind and I can help, let me know, for if anyone is entitled to the fruits of victory you are that one." They remained close friends until her death in 1951.

She also served as a key player in Franklin Delano Roosevelt's 1932 Presidential campaign. She helped secure the nomination for Roosevelt, and during the campaign she was one of four women sent by the DNC on speaking tours across the country. She was one of handful of women rewarded for her contributions to his election, though she was not seeking a major patronage position for herself. A prolific writer, she was the author of several books, many short stories, and innumerable articles on politics. She also served from 1925 to 1934 as an editor of Good Housekeeping magazine.

Blair was active in securing positions for women in the New Deal. Appointed to the Consumers' Advisory Board of the National Industrial Recovery Act, she became its chairwoman in 1935. Her last public service came in 1942 when she was appointed chief of the women's interest section of the War Department's Bureau of Public Relations.

In the 1940s, the Washington Post regularly covered the Blairs' parties, which often included Washington's elite. In her autobiography, she remembered how she was described by Senator Carter Glass: "I was like the drink called Southern Comfort which goes down so smooth and easily but has an awful kick afterwards". She retired from public life in 1944 after suffering a stroke.

=== Works ===
- The Women's Committee, U.S. Council of National Defense: An Interpretive Report

=== Death ===
She died on August 3, 1951, in Alexandria, Arlington County, Virginia.
