= Missouri League of Women Voters =

Nonpartisan organization

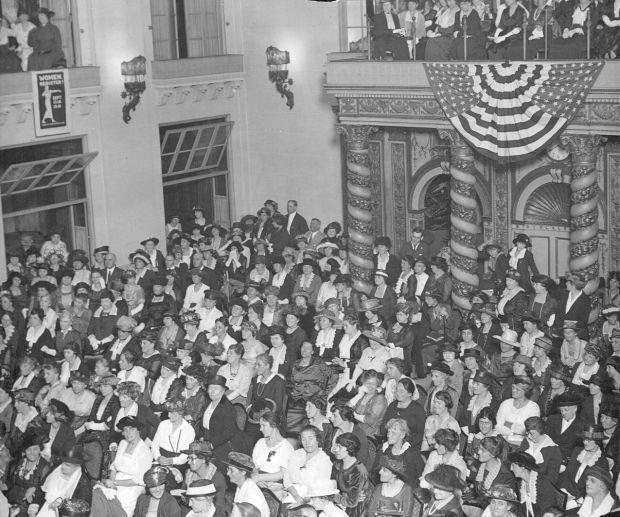
- Established: October 1919 (107 years ago)
- Types: nonprofit organization
- Legal status: 501(c)(4)
- Headquarters: St. Louis
- Country: United States
- Part of: League of Women Voters
- Revenue: 43,273 United States dollar (2020)
- Total Assets: 64,144 United States dollar (2020)
- Website: my.lwv.org/missouri

The Missouri League of Women Voters (LWV Missouri) is a nonpartisan organization to inform women voters in the American state of Missouri and encourage their participation in the political process. It was founded in 1919 as a successor to the Equal Suffrage League, a campaign for women's suffrage in the state, and appointed Edna Gellhorn as its first president. It is affiliated to the U.S.-wide League of Women Voters and organizes local branches in different parts of the state.

== History ==
The Missouri League of Women Voters was organized at the Golden Jubilee Convention of the National American Woman Suffrage Association in St. Louis, Missouri in March, 1919. Missouri had just passed a bill allowing women to vote, but the Equal Suffrage League was initially not allowed to change its name to reflect the new legislation. Later, the National President of the League of Women Voters, Mrs. Carrie Chapman Catt, called a state convention and allowed the League to change its name. On October 16, 17, and 18, 1919, the Missouri Suffrage Association held a convention and the old League became the Missouri League of Women Voters.

At the convention, 122 delegates from active Missouri suffrage leagues were present and the Statler Hotel ballroom was filled to capacity. A new constitution, written by Miss Laura Runyon of Warrensburg, Miss Myrtle Wood of St. Louis, and Mrs. Elmer McKay of Springfield, was adopted. Article II of the constitution read " The aims of this League shall be to increase the effectiveness of women's vote in furthering better government. The League, as an organization, shall be strictly non-partisan. Its officers and members are free to join the party of their choice." Initially, both major political parties were suspicious of the League of Women Voters, as they were worried it would interfere with their own plans for organizing women.

Edna Gellhorn was the first president of the Missouri League of Women Voters. She held classes for first time voters across Missouri, often traveling in the caboose of a milk train. She served as president of the St. Louis League of Women Voters three times and served on the national board.

== Policies ==
At the time of its founding, the Missouri League of Women Voters were described as a group of enfranchised women who want not just to vote, but to vote for something. As women were given the right to vote in 1919, suffragists turned their attention from the effort to secure the vote towards using their vote to build a better world. Members were identified as political, but not partisan.

LWV Missouri encourages informed and active participation in government. The organization is nonpartisan and does not endorse or oppose any political party or candidate. LWV educates voters, encourages citizens to register to vote, and communicates policy priorities to government officials. They also provide training on voting procedures, candidate, issues, lobbying, and campaigning. In order to project a nonpartisan stance, visible leaders of LWV refrain from political activity, partisan support, or running for office.

== See also ==
- Elections in Missouri
- Category:2024 elections in Missouri
