= Florence Wyman Richardson =

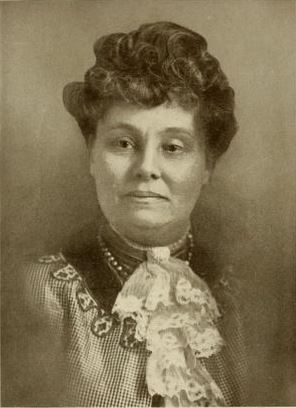
- Richardson, 1914
- Born: Florence Wyman; March 24, 1855; St. Louis, Missouri
- Died: August 19, 1920 (aged 65)
- Spouse: James Richardson (m. 1878–1905) his death

Florence Wyman Richardson (March 24, 1855 – August 19, 1920) was one of the early workers for the St. Louis Symphony Society and assisted in organizing the St. Louis Equal Suffrage League.

== Youth ==
Florence Wyman was born on March 24, 1855, in St. Louis. Her parents were Edward Wyman, a noted educator, and Elizabeth Frances Hadley. Both moved to St. Louis from Boston. When her mother died, her father remarried to Martha Leigh.

From the age of eight years up to twenty-two Wyman studied music, her first teacher being Sabatski. Her most influential teacher was William G. Robyn, father of Alfred Robyn. He was succeeded by a number of other teachers, notably Egmont Froelich, who gave her a valuable training in technic specified as the Stuttgart method. At nineteen she began work with Arthur J. Creswold, and after a year was given a position as organist in the First Presbyterian Church, playing in concerts as well as for the service.

Florence Wyman was educated at Bonham's Seminary and Mary Institute, graduating from the latter in 1873, in the class with Emilie Johnson and Nellie Hazeltine, and again from the advanced course two years later, under Carlos Pennell, Wilham G. Elliott and Miss Wall.

== Marriage and family ==
She was married in 1878 to James Richardson II (1855–1905), vice-president of the Doctor J.H. McClean Medicine Company of St. Louis.

He was born in St. Louis around 1855, the son of the first James Richardson, the founder of the "very successful" Richardson Drug Company of that city, said to be the "largest drug house in the West, if not the world." He had a brother, J. Clifford Richardson, who became a banker.

Richardson was the St. Louis commissioner of supplies under Mayor Cyrus Walbridge.

The couple had three sons and three daughters (among whom: James III, Dorothea (1880–1911), Florence Wyman (1889–1966), and Elizabeth Hadley (1891–1979)). Elizabeth later was married to writer Ernest Hemingway.

Richardson, the husband, killed himself by gunshot on February 8, 1905. It was said he was worried over losses from speculative investments in the wheat market.

== Civic activities ==
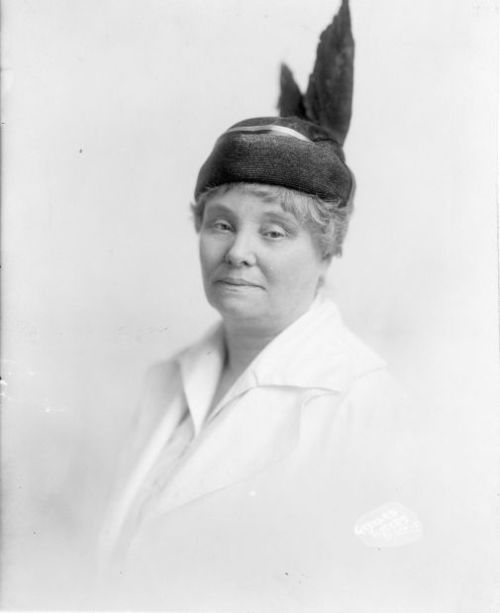
Florence Wyman Richardson, 1920

For twelve years Florence Wyman Richardson conducted classes in theosophy, also contributed to leading periodicals. Later she became a member of the executive board of the Women's Trade Union League, and of the Suffrage Committee of the National Women's Trade Union.

Richardson originated the idea of organizing the Piano Club, of which she was the president for the first seven years. This was the first lasting music club of St. Louis. It was formed to foster piano work, only one-third of the members being vocalists and two-thirds pianists. Many of the musicales were given at Richardson's home in Cabanne Place, where the club entertained among others, Carl Faelton, of the New England Conservatory; Mrs. Eliot, wife of Harvard's president, and also gave its friends the pleasure of a recital by Adele Aus der Ohe.

It was again at her home, that Richardson called a meeting of women interested in music to take a part in forming a symphony organization in connection with the local choral society. This was one of the efforts which shortly afterwards helped in the founding of a home orchestra which has developed into the St. Louis Symphony Orchestra.

She was friends with Josiah Royce, Hamlin Garland and John Fiske; other friends included Guida Lippman, Lydia Fuller Dickinson and Charles L. Deyo.

Richardson was a student of theosophy. For twelve years she led classes in this field of religious philosophy. She visited for three successive seasons, several weeks each, the summer colony called Greenacre, at Eliot, Maine, on the Piscataqua River. The colony was attended, among others, by Edward Everett Hale, John Fiske, Edwin D. Meade, Charles Johnston and Nathaniel Schmidt. During her Greenacre experience she lectured seven times — the topics being Music, Genius and Theosophy. In St. Louis she presided for several years over the little local branch of the Theosophical Society, but in 1908 resigned continuing her study classes for two years later.

== Suffrage work ==
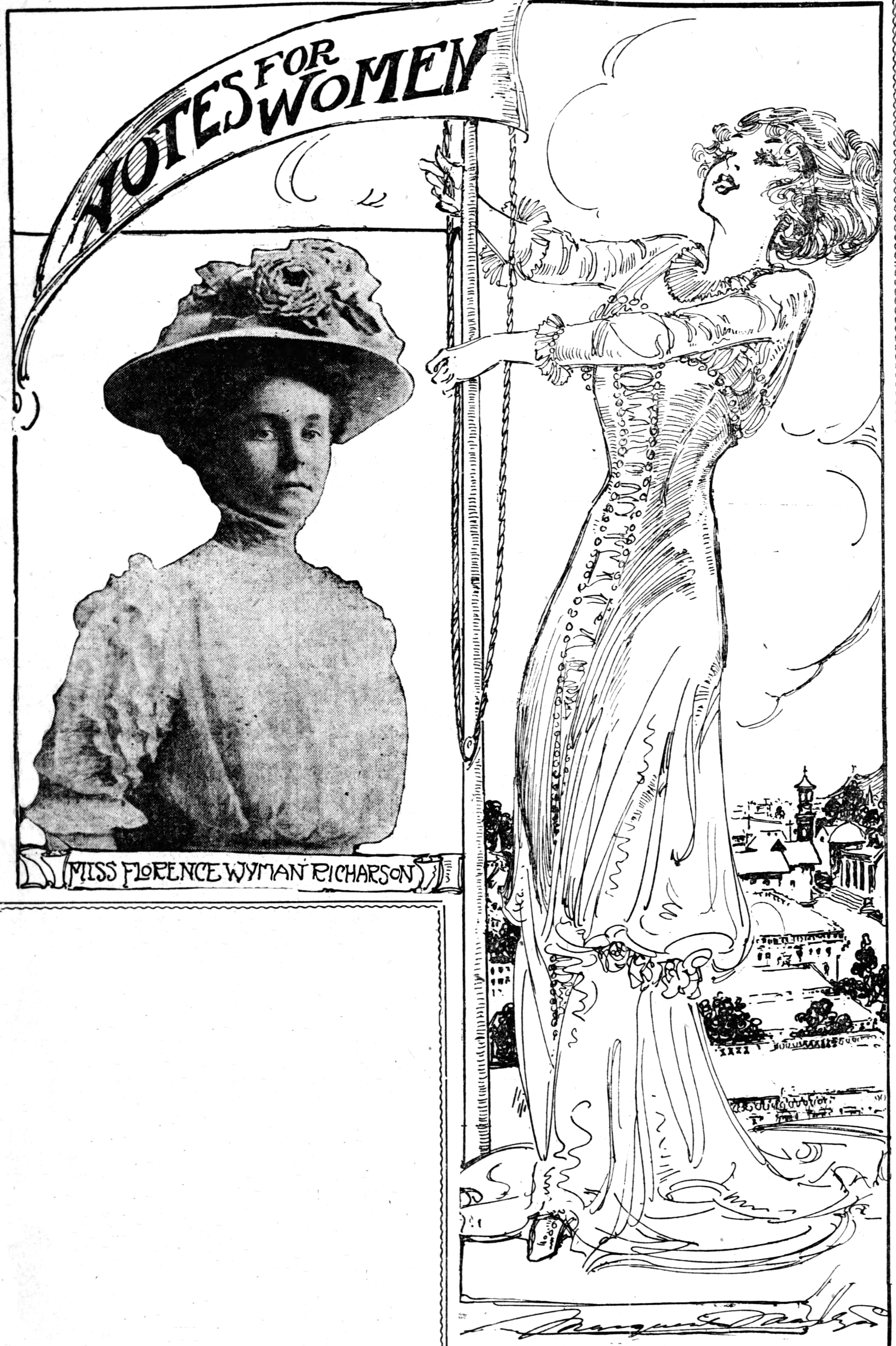
Daughter Florence Wyman Richardson in a photo and as sketched by journalist Marguerite Martyn in the St. Louis Post-Dispatch of March 13, 1910

In 1882 Richardson joined the suffrage club founded by Virginia L. Minor, working for a time on a petition to the Missouri Legislature asking that the age of consent be raised. At that time it was twelve years in Missouri, ten and eleven in several others, and seven in Delaware. Illness in her family prevented a continuance of this work and a period of inertness and inactivity followed into which she lapsed into a mainly personal life.

In 1908 she was placed on the executive board of the St. Louis Woman's Trade Union League and at the convention of the National Woman's Trade Union League in Boston, in 1911, was made a member of the suffrage committee of that body.

In 1910 Richardson received a call from Laura Gregg who has been active in the Arizona suffrage campaign. She announced herself as being sent from the National Woman Suffrage headquarters in response to a request from Florence W. Richardson, Richardson's daughter. The three women thrashed the matter over that afternoon and immediately afterwards Florence Richardson — later married to Roland G. Usher, of Washington University - drew up a circular letter, addressing it to a small number of women. A half dozen met in response.

After this, the daughter made a house-to-house canvass; the newspapers hailed the women as something new, giving them a notoriety. The first suffrage speech made by Richardson was at the Artists' Guild, the second was from the platform of the Christian Socialists, and many more followed.

A second circular letter was sent to a larger number of women, many of whom met at Richardson's home at 5737 Cates Avenue on April 13, 1910, and organized with forty members, electing her as president; Garesche and Atkinson, vice-presidents, and Bertha Rombauer and Mrs. D. W. Kneffler, secretary and treasurer, respectively. A board of fifteen governors was formed including the officers. Richardson reluctantly resigned the presidency on account of ill-health in February, 1912.

== Death ==
Mrs. Richardson died on August 19, 1920. She is buried at Bellefontaine Cemetery.
