= Frances Squire Potter =

American academic and activist (1867–1914)

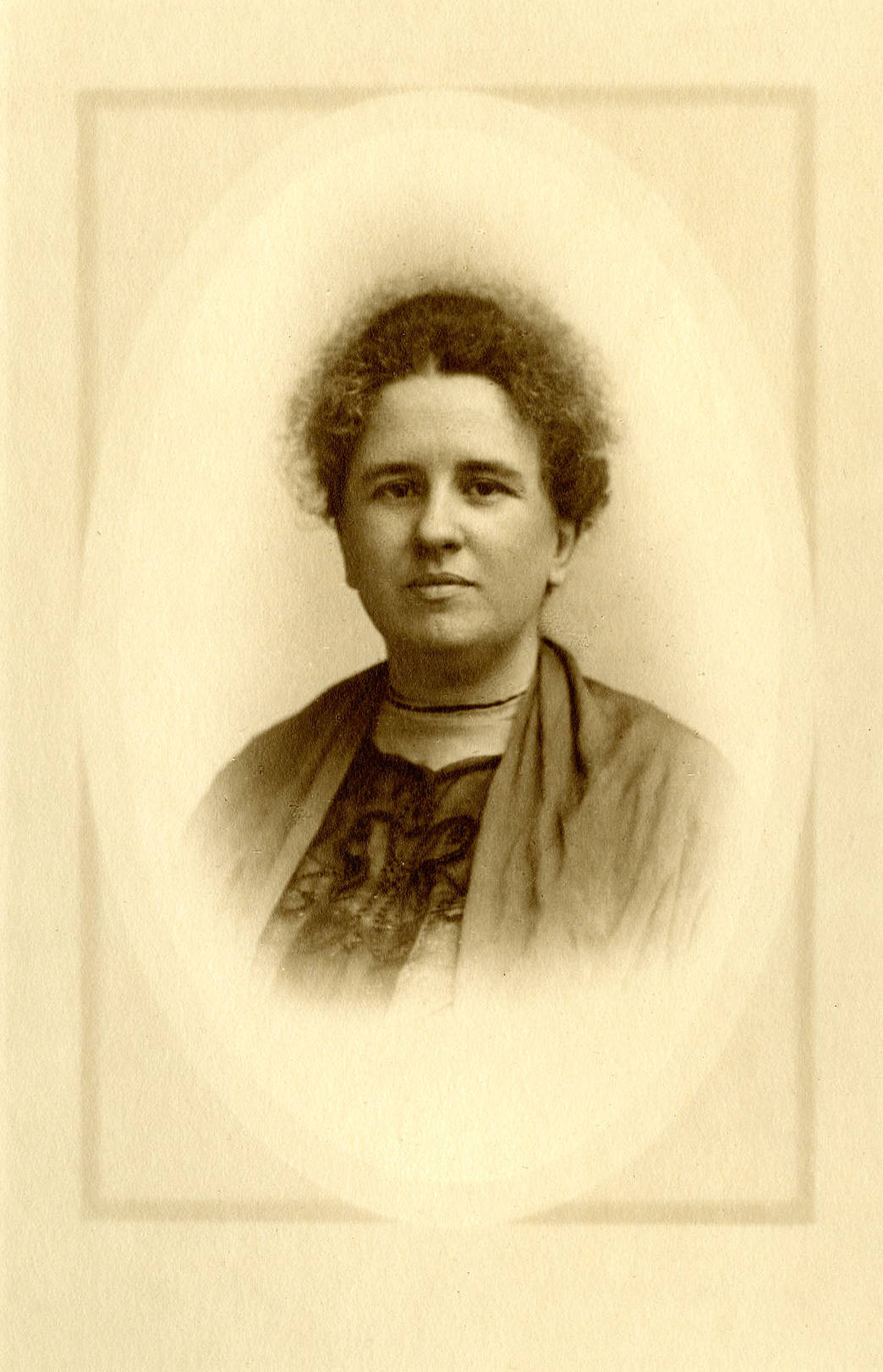
- Born: November 12, 1867; Elmira
- Died: March 25, 1914; Chicago
- Education: Elmira College

Frances Boardman Squire Potter (November 12, 1867 – March 25, 1914) was an American academic and activist.

Frances Boardman Squire was born on November 12, 1867, in Elmira, New York, to Grace (Smith) and Truman H. Squire. She married Winfield S. Potter in 1891.

Potter attended Elmira College as an undergraduate from 1883 to 1887, graduating with an AB, and received a master's degree in 1889. She moved to Minneapolis, Minnesota, shortly after graduating. Initially she taught high school and then became a professor of English at the University of Minnesota, where she was a full professor from 1907 to 1909. She did research on the papers of John Milton at the University of Cambridge while on a leave of absence from her professorship around 1907.

Potter left her professorship to become the corresponding secretary of the National American Woman Suffrage Association (NAWSA), after being elected at NAWSA's national convention in 1909. Around that time, she also chaired the literary committee of the General Federation of Women's Clubs and edited Life and Labor, its magazine.

She died on March 25, 1914, in Chicago.

== Publications ==
- Germelshausen (play, 1904, with Mary Gray Peck and Carl Schlenker)
- The Ballingtons (novel; Little, Brown and Company, 1905)
- The Common School Spelling Book
- "The Educational Value of the Woman's Trade Union" (1911)
