= Marie Ruoff Byrum =

Marie Ruoff Byrum (September 30, 1893 – January 1967) of Hannibal, Missouri, was the first woman, after the effective date of the Nineteenth Amendment to the U.S. Constitution, to vote in an election for public office under the amendment's guarantees. Prior to the enactment of the 19th Amendment, suffrage for women in the United States was left up to each of the individual states. In 15 of the states, women could vote in all state elections. Missouri had ratified the amendment in 1919, but only to allow women to vote in a U.S. presidential election. The 19th Amendment was certified on August 26, 1920; the election for a local alderman on August 31, 1920, was the first election for office after Missouri, and all other states, were required to abide by a constitutional requirement that the right to vote "shall not be denied or abridged... by any State" because of gender. On August 27, a "yes/no" election on a bond issue was held in South St. Paul, Minnesota, but the August 31 vote in which Mrs. Byrum participated was the first for the choice of a candidate for office, and she was the first person in that regard to be granted rights under the 19th Amendment.

== Women's Suffrage Amendment ==
A year earlier on June 4, 1919, the United States Congress passed the resolution and on August 18, 1920, it was ratified. The 19th Amendment was added to the U.S. Constitution on August 26, 1920. Called the Women's Suffrage Amendment, it reads:

The right of citizens on the United States to vote shall not be denied or abridged by the United States or by any State on account of sex. Congress shall have power to enforce this article by appropriate legislation.

It is signed by Speaker of the House, Frederick H. Gillett and by Vice President, Thomas R. Marshall.

== Special election ==
Only a few days after ratification of the amendment, the town of Hannibal, Missouri, held a special election to fill an open seat for alderman. In the weeks leading to election day, Byrum had a friendly competition with Nita Harrison, regarding which of the two of them would cast the first vote in Hannibal.

Living some 15 blocks from the polling place, Marie and her husband began walking at 5:30 a.m. in a drizzling rain. When they arrived at 7 a.m. their clothes were quite damp, but they were the first voters to arrive that morning at the polling place located at the corner of Main and North Streets. At 7 a.m. on Tuesday, August 31, Marie Ruoff Byrum signed the register and cast her vote, thus becoming the first woman in the United States to vote after the passage of the Women's Suffrage Amendment. Byrum had just cast her vote at 7 a.m. when Nita Harrison arrived at the polling place by automobile. At 7:01 a.m. Harrison became the second woman to cast her vote in Hannibal. The two women knew at the time that they were the first women to vote in the small town of Hannibal, Missouri. Soon, Marie learned she was also the first woman to vote in the State of Missouri. It was some time later, though, that Marie learned she was in fact the first woman in the country to vote after the passage of the amendment.

The poll book from that day, which includes Byrum's signature on the first line, is housed in the Missouri State Archives in Jefferson City, Missouri. While Mrs. Byrum does hold significance as being the first woman to vote after the passage of the Constitutional Amendment, she was not the first woman to vote in the United States. Some states had granted women the right to vote prior to 1920 (e.g. Wyoming allowed women to vote as early as 1869). However, Byrum was the first woman in the United States to vote after the national law was passed.

== Biography ==
Marie Louise Ruoff was born September 30, 1893, in Marion County, Missouri. She was the daughter of Joseph Matthaeus "Matt" Ruoff and Ana Katherine "Kate" Rein, who emigrated from Genkingen, Germany to Americ in the years 1889 and 1891, respectively. The second of four children born to the Matt and Kate Ruoff, Marie had three brothers: Henry John Ruoff, Eugene Frederick Ruoff, and Albert Nicholas Ruoff. At a young age, Marie knew adversity. Her mother contracted tuberculosis when Marie was a youngster and spent the remainder of her life in a hospital. Marie's father died when she was only 13. After her parents' deaths, she and her brothers were raised by her uncle and aunt, John and Maria Ruoff. On June 14, 1917, at the age of 23, Marie married Morris King Byrum, son of local politician Lacy Morris Byrum and his wife, Ella King. The Byrums were very active in local politics and from all accounts, supported the rights of women to vote.

== Later life ==
Not much is known about Marie Ruoff Byrum after that day. She and her husband lived in Hannibal, Missouri, for several years and participated actively in the local government. They had three children and eventually retired to Florida where she died in January 1967.
