= 1915 Pennsylvania Amendment 1 =

Referendum on women's suffrage

- November 2, 1915

Results
Choice	Votes	%
Yes	385,348	46.63%
No	441,034	53.37%
Yes
70–80%
60–70%
50–60%
No
70–80%
60–70%
50–60%

1915 Pennsylvania Amendment 1 was a proposed amendment to the Constitution of Pennsylvania to grant women the right to vote. The amendment was defeated with 53.37% of the vote opposed, and with a bare majority of 34 out of 67 counties voting against.

== Background ==
In March 1915, Pennsylvania's legislature passed a bill that added the referendum to the November 1915 ballot.

In the lead up to the election, Hannah Patterson made calls for a Pennsylvania Woman Suffrage Party Convention to take place in Harrisburg, in order to plan out the final push to get out the vote. Attendants of the convention included Suffrage Party leaders and legislative leaders.

The calendar developed at the convention was as follows:

"May and June 1915: Open-air work, especially street meetings to continue through the summer and fall. July 1915: auto tours of rural sections. August 1915: suffrage booths at county fairs. September 1915: Headquarters at full strength so that the climax of the campaign – a house to house canvass of registered voters – can be carried out effectively".

== Viewpoints ==
Legislators

Democrat Joseph H. Guffey: "I strongly favor woman suffrage. I shall vote to give the women of Pennsylvania the ballot and I shall give them all the personal support in my power."

== Results ==
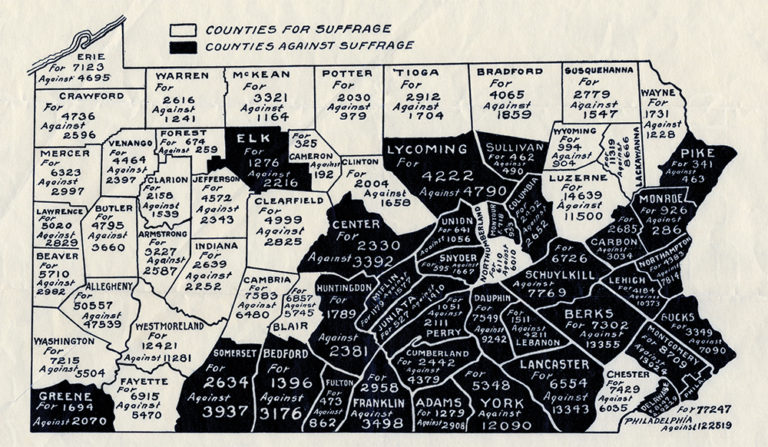
A graphic displaying the 1915 referendum vote total by county, produced by Pennsylvania Men's League for Women's Suffrage.

33 counties voted in favor, and 34 voted against. The highest level of support for the amendment came from McKean County, with 74.05% in favor, and the lowest level came from Snyder County, with 26.30% in favor.

The following table details the results by county:

County	Yes		No	
County	#	%	#	%
Adams	1,279	30.55	2,908	69.45
Allegheny	50,557	51.54	47,539	48.46
Armstrong	3,277	55.88	2,587	44.12
Beaver	5,710	65.69	2,982	34.31
Bedford	1,396	30.53	3,176	69.47
Berks	7,302	35.35	13,355	64.65
Blair	6,857	54.41	5,745	45.59
Bradford	4,065	68.62	1,859	31.38
Bucks	3,349	32.08	7,090	67.92
Butler	4,795	56.71	3,660	43.29
Cambria	7,583	53.92	6,480	46.08
Cameron	325	62.86	192	37.14
Carbon	2,685	46.95	3,034	53.05
Centre	2,330	40.72	3,392	59.28
Chester	7,429	55.18	6,035	44.82
Clarion	2,158	58.37	1,539	41.63
Clearfield	4,999	63.89	2,825	36.11
Clinton	2,004	54.72	1,658	45.28
Columbia	2,402	47.53	2,652	52.47
Crawford	4,736	64.59	2,596	35.41
Cumberland	2,442	35.80	4,379	64.20
Dauphin	7,549	44.96	9,242	55.04
Delaware	8,147	46.89	9,229	53.11
Elk	1,276	36.54	2,216	63.46
Erie	7,123	60.27	4,695	39.73
Fayette	6,915	55.83	5,470	44.17
Forest	674	72.24	259	27.76
Franklin	2,958	45.82	3,498	54.18
Fulton	473	35.43	862	64.57
Greene	1,694	45.01	2,070	54.99
Huntingdon	1,789	42.90	2,381	57.10
Indiana	2,639	53.96	2,252	46.04
Jefferson	4,572	66.12	2,343	33.88
Juniata	527	27.21	1,410	72.79
Lackawanna	11,319	56.64	8,666	43.36
Lancaster	6,554	32.94	13,343	67.06
Lawrence	5,020	63.96	2,829	36.04
Lebanon	1,511	26.41	4,211	73.59
Lehigh	4,184	28.74	10,373	71.26
Luzerne	14,639	56.00	11,500	44.00
Lycoming	4,222	46.85	4,790	53.15
McKean	3,321	74.05	1,164	25.95
Mercer	6,329	67.86	2,997	32.14
Mifflin	1,179	42.78	1,577	57.22
Monroe	926	41.86	1,286	58.14
Montgomery	8,709	40.07	13,024	59.93
Montour	718	42.97	953	57.03
Northampton	4,383	35.94	7,814	64.06
Northumberland	6,110	50.41	6,010	49.59
Perry	1,051	33.24	2,111	66.76
Philadelphia	77,247	38.67	122,519	61.33
Pike	341	42.41	463	57.59
Potter	2,030	67.46	979	32.54
Schuylkill	6,726	46.40	7,769	53.60
Snyder	595	26.30	1,667	73.70
Somerset	2,634	40.09	3,937	59.91
Sullivan	463	48.58	490	51.42
Susquehanna	2,779	64.24	1,547	35.76
Tioga	2,912	63.08	1,704	36.92
Union	641	37.77	1,056	62.23
Venango	4,464	65.06	2,397	34.94
Warren	2,616	67.82	1,241	32.18
Washington	7,215	56.73	5,504	43.27
Wayne	1,731	58.50	1,228	41.50
Westmoreland	12,421	52.40	11,281	47.60
Wyoming	994	52.37	904	47.63
York	5,348	30.67	12,090	69.33
State total	385,348	46.63	441,034	53.37

== Later events ==
On June 24, 1919, Pennsylvania's legislature voted to ratify the Nineteenth Amendment. On August 18, 1920, the 36th state needed for ratification approved the amendment. The U.S. Secretary of State certified the amendment on August 26, 1920.

== See also ==
- Women's suffrage in the United States
