= Women's suffrage in Missouri =

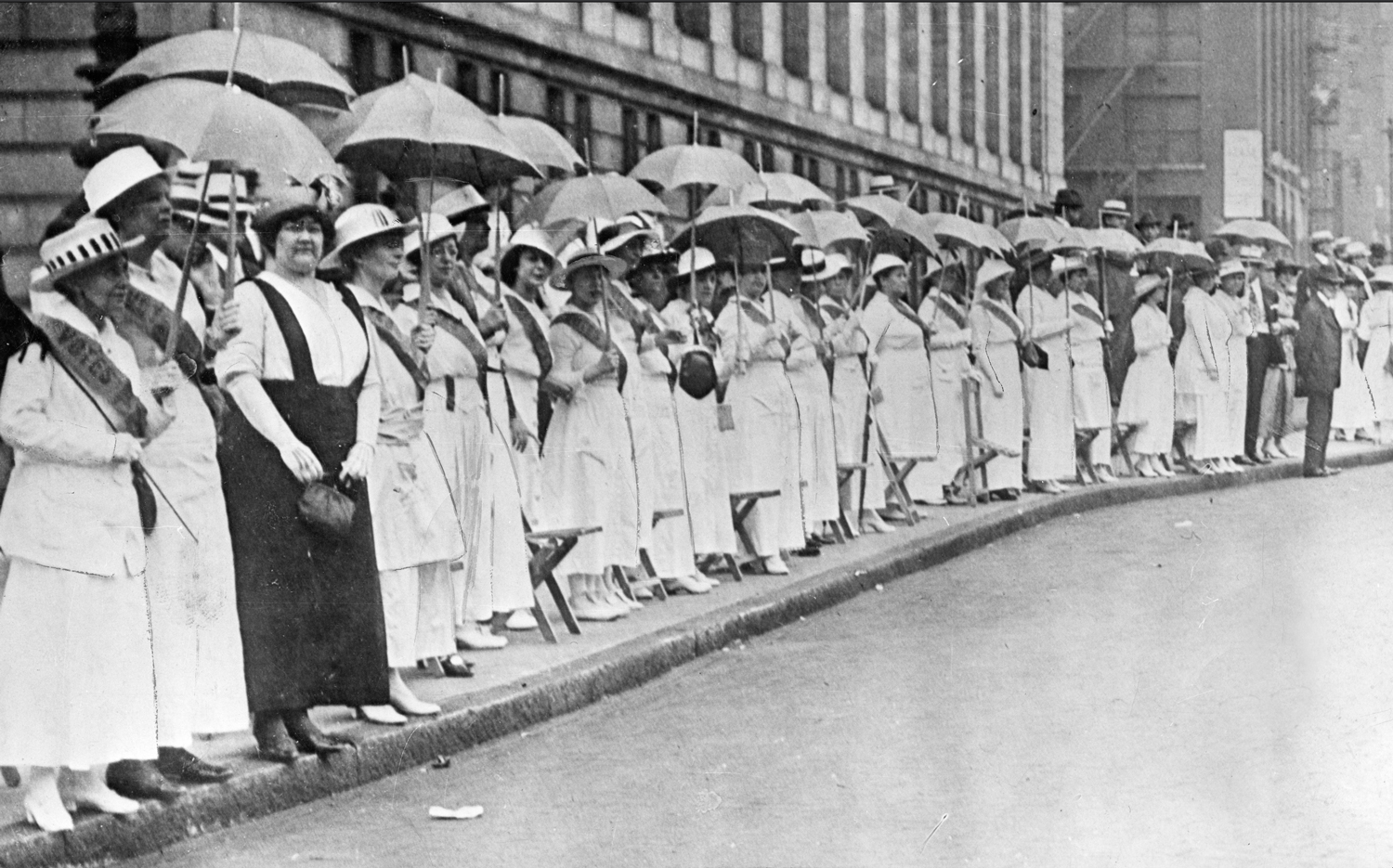
The Golden Lane, suffragists in St. Louis, June 14, 1916

The women's suffrage movement was active in Missouri mostly after the Civil War. There were significant developments in the St. Louis area, though groups and organized activity took place throughout the state. An early suffrage group, the Woman Suffrage Association of Missouri, was formed in 1867, attracting the attention of Susan B. Anthony and leading to news items around the state. This group, the first of its kind, lobbied the Missouri General Assembly for women's suffrage and established conventions. In the early 1870s, many women voted or registered to vote as an act of civil disobedience. The suffragist Virginia Minor was one of these women when she tried to register to vote on October 15, 1872. She and her husband, Francis Minor, sued, leading to a Supreme Court case that asserted the Fourteenth Amendment granted women the right to vote. The case, Minor v. Happersett, was decided against the Minors and led suffragists in the country to pursue legislative means to grant women suffrage.

Women's suffrage groups continued to fight in Missouri and also outside of the state. The Marysville Ladies Marching Band was featured in the Woman Suffrage Procession on March 13, 1913. It was the only all-female marching band and helped quiet the angry crowds. During the 1916 Democratic National Convention, suffragists Emily Newell Blair and Edna Gellhorn planned a silent, motionless parade. This event received national attention and helped gain some support from the Democratic delegates.

Women in Missouri gained the right to vote in presidential elections in April 1919, a few months before Governor Frederick D. Gardner called for a special legislative session to ratify the Nineteenth Amendment. Missouri ratified the amendment on July 3, 1919, making Missouri the eleventh state to ratify. Soon after, Missouri's groups formed the Missouri League of Women Voters and other local chapters of the League of Women Voters.

== Early efforts ==
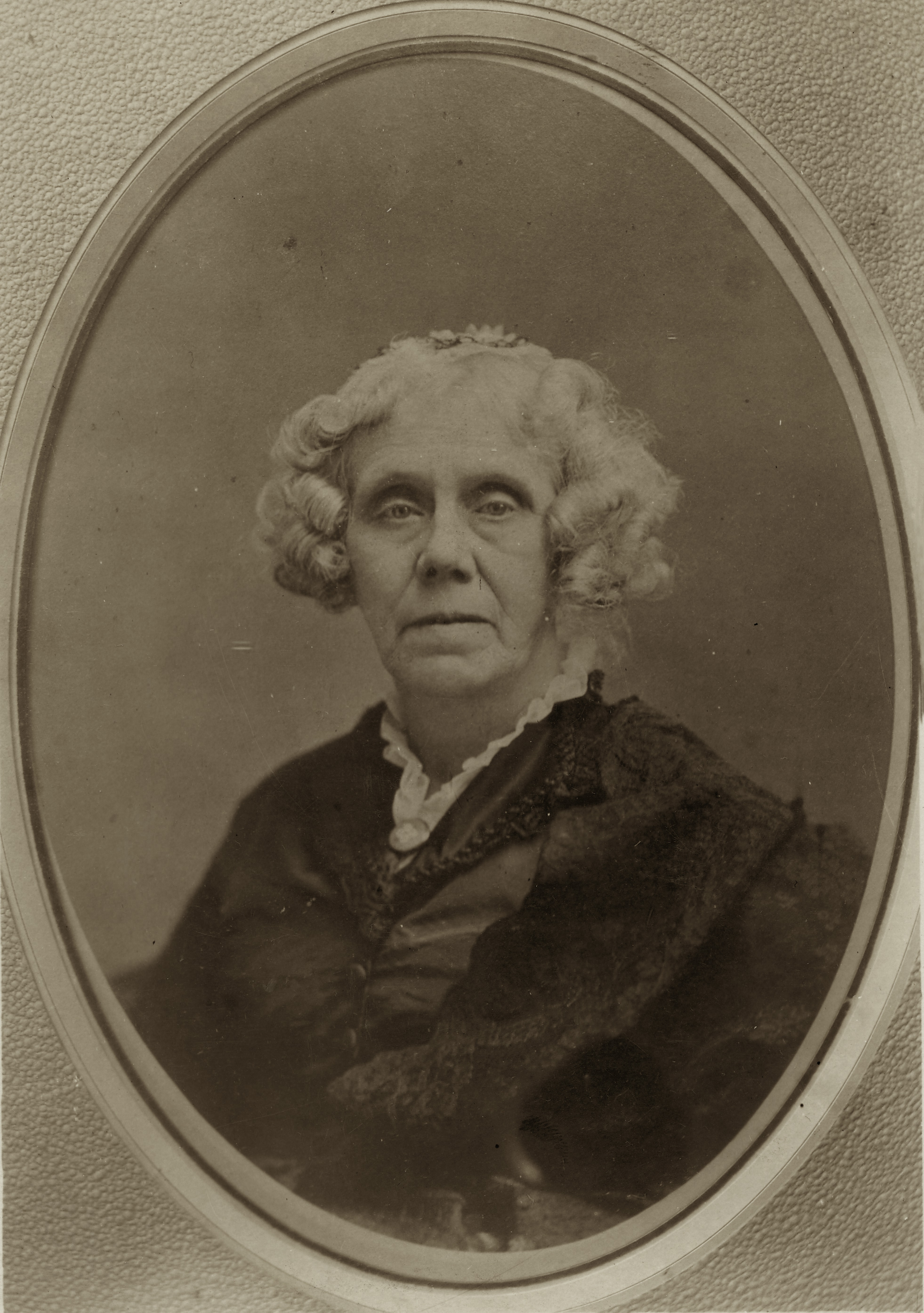
Anna L. Clapp, President, St. Louis Ladies Union Aid Society

Much of the women's suffrage activity in Missouri took place after the Civil War and was centered in St. Louis. However, other areas, such as Columbia and Kansas City also played a key role in working towards women's suffrage. A group that was important early on in Missouri women's suffrage history was the Ladies Union Aid Society of St. Louis (LUAS). On May 8, 1867, the Woman Suffrage Association of Missouri was created by former members of LUAS who met at the Mercantile Library Hall. It was the first political organization in the United States formed solely to advocate for women's suffrage. Among the founders were Anna Clapp and Lucretia Hall. Virginia Minor became its first president. Susan B. Anthony, impressed with the immediate success of the group, visited them in 1867. In October 1867, a women's suffrage convention took place in St. Louis, drawing a large attendance. The Woman Suffrage Association of Missouri also attracted attention in news coverage around the state.

One of the first actions the Woman Suffrage Association of Missouri took on was to collect signatures for a petition for women's suffrage. The group succeeded in obtaining more than 350 signatures which it presented to the Missouri General Assembly. Phoebe Couzins spoke before the legislature for women's suffrage. The St. Joseph Gazette reported that the women from the Woman Suffrage Association were received with "favor". Legislators talked about combining women's suffrage with suffrage for African-American people in the state. However the proposition was voted down.

The first suffrage convention in Missouri was held in St. Louis in 1869 at the Mercantile Library Hall. The Missouri Woman Suffrage Convention hosted a number of speakers and influential suffragists like Susan B. Anthony and Julia Ward Howe. It drew women from out of state, including one woman from Kansas who was arrested and briefly detained for wearing bloomers. At the convention, Virginia Minor put forth the idea that the Fourteenth Amendment already provided women the right to vote. Virginia's husband, Francis Minor, wrote up resolutions and pamphlets were printed up based on this idea. These pamphlets were circulated around the country and the idea it spawned was called the "New Departure". Much of the work on these legal ideas was based on the law that Francis Minor had practiced to protect his wife in case he died before she did.

In this same year, the Missouri Woman Suffrage Association decided not to affiliate with any national groups, though they did send two delegates to a national convention in Washington, D.C. Meetings were well attended by both men and women and were held twice a month. Other active groups at the time included the St. Louis branch of the National Woman Suffrage Association (NWSA).

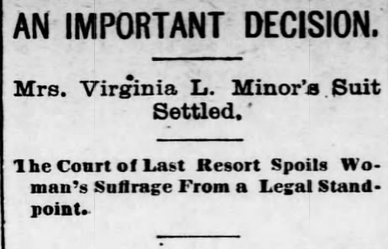
"An Important Decision" from St. Louis Post-Dispatch, March 31, 1875

In the early 1870s, across the United States, Black and white women were attempting to register to vote or to vote in various elections, many of them inspired by Virginia Minor. Virginia Minor attempted to register to vote on October 15, 1872 in St. Louis and was denied by the registrar, Reese Happersett, on the basis of sex. Her husband, Francis Minor, sued on her behalf since women could not file suits in Missouri until 1889. Based on the argument that she was a United States citizen, he argued, Virginia Minor should be allowed to vote. The case went to the Supreme Court of the United States (SCOTUS) in 1874 as Minor v. Happersett. The court ruled against Minor in a unanimous decision, stating that citizens are not guaranteed the right to vote by the United States Constitution. Chief Justice Morrison Waite wrote: "If the law is wrong, it ought to be changed; but the power for that is not with us." Minor v. Happersett showed suffragists across the country that the path to women's suffrage would be through changing the laws, not challenging them in the courts.

In 1875, Missouri considered women's suffrage during the state constitutional convention. Couzins went on a lecture tour to support women's suffrage in 1876. Women brought petitions to the Missouri General Assembly asking for a women's suffrage amendment to the state constitution in 1881. In 1883, women again petitioned the assembly for general and presidential suffrage. The Missouri Woman Suffrage Association seems to have lost momentum around 1886 while other groups in the state remained fairly active.

Another women's suffrage convention took place in St. Louis 1889. More areas of the state were represented here with women from Bloomfield, Brookfield, Cameron, Fayette, La Monte, Maryville, Montgomery, and Wentzville elected as officers in the Missouri branch of NAWSA. Petitions for women's suffrage came from all over the state, including Clinton County, Jackson County, Pike County and St. Clair County.

In 1892, the Kansas City Equal Suffrage League was formed with Kersey Coates as president. A suffrage convention took place in Kansas City, Missouri that featured women and their groups from around the country. The Mississippi Valley Congress held a convention in St. Louis in 1895 and was sponsored by the Woman's Christian Temperance Union (WCTU). Both Susan B. Anthony and Anna Howard Shaw spoke at the convention.

The Missouri Equal Suffrage Association (MESA) was formed in 1895 after delegates from Missouri attended the Mississippi Valley Congress of Women. In 1896, MESA organized a convention in St. Louis to take place concurrently with the 1896 Republican National Convention. Delegates from women's suffrage groups across the country came to try to influence the Republicans to add a women's suffrage plank in their platform. They were unsuccessful, and in addition, there was a lot of infighting between MESA and the St. Louis suffrage group.

== Suffrage efforts gain visibility ==
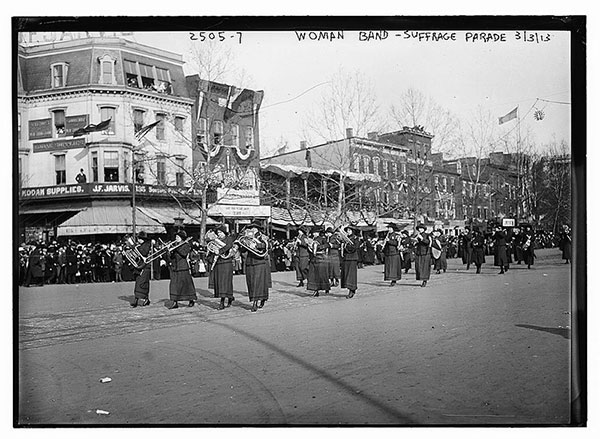
Missouri Ladies Military Band from Marysville marches in Washington, D.C., on March 3, 1913

In 1910, Emmeline Pankhurst came to tour the United States. Her visit inspired women in St. Louis to create the Equal Suffrage League (ESL). Pankhurst was not able to come to St. Louis, but the effort of getting together and inviting her to talk had given the suffragists more strength and helped grow the movement again in Missouri. On April 10, 1910, the ESL of St. Louis was formed with Florence Wyman Richardson as president. In 1911, three other clubs merged into the Missouri Equal Suffrage Association (MESA). MESA divided the state into districts.

Missouri was represented in the Woman Suffrage Procession on March 3, 1913. The Maryville Ladies Marching Band, from Maryville, Missouri, was the only all-women band in the parade. When the parade became violent with men pushing and harassing the women, the band was used to calm the crowd. It was reported that the men were "shocked at the sight of women playing such 'wonderful music.'" That spring, in the state of Missouri, MESA collected more than 14,000 signatures in support of women's suffrage. Representative Thomas J. Roney brought the petition to the Missouri General Assembly and helped create a women's suffrage bill. The bill was defeated in the Senate, and its defeat was discouraging for many women in Missouri.

In the fall of 1913, the St. Louis managers of the Merchants and Manufacturers Street Exposition helped the suffragists plan a car parade for September 30, 1913. The parade had 30 cars with men and women waving yellow "Votes for Women" pennants. One car was covered with the purple banner of MESA. After the car procession, the women marched again on the street behind a marching band. They ended the parade at Franklin Avenue where the suffragists gave speeches on soap boxes.

During a 1913 suffrage conference in Missouri, Black suffragist, Victoria Clay Haley, attended as a representative of the Federated Colored Women's Club. It took place in a hotel that was fairly segregated and Haley, while asked to leave, did not, showing she had just as much right to be there as the white suffragists. Haley also went to the Mississippi Valley Suffrage Conference in 1914.

Throughout 1913 and 1914 suffragists in Columbia gave speeches at every women's organization in the city. The Columbia suffragists also brought in suffragists from other states. An amendment to add women's suffrage to the state constitution was up for a vote in November 1914. After the defeat of the women's suffrage amendment in 1914, Emily Newell Blair accepted a position as the first editor of the suffrage magazine The Missouri Woman. Later, in April 1916, Mary Semple Scott took over as editor of the magazine.

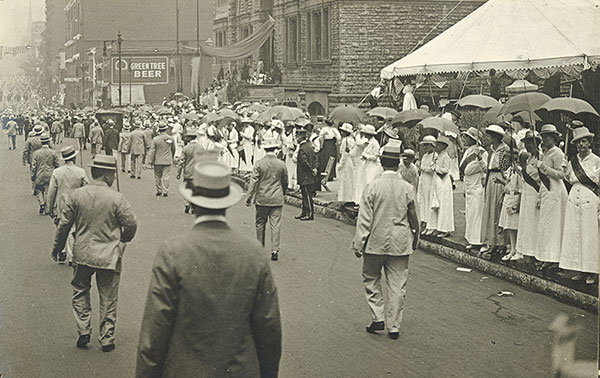
Delegates to the Democratic National Convention walk on the Golden Lane 1916

During the 1916 Democratic National Convention, suffragists staged a demonstration. The idea for the silent protest came from Emily Newell Blair in February earlier that year. More than 3,000 women lined twelve blocks along Locust Street, wearing white dresses, "votes for women" sashes and holding yellow umbrellas. They did not move or talk and the event, which was organized by Edna Gellhorn, was called a "walkless, talkless parade," or the "Golden Lane". The demonstration was meant to show how women had been silenced by not being allowed to vote. The event gained national attention in the media. The Democratic delegates voted to support women's suffrage on a state by state basis. Also in June, during the 1916 Republican National Convention, women sent telegrams to the Missouri electors to convince them to support women's suffrage in the Republican platform. The Republican convention declined to support a federal suffrage amendment, but instead supported suffrage by state.

In 1916, ten Missouri women went to the National Suffrage Convention in Atlantic City as delegates. They pledged Missouri's suffragists to work towards passage of a federal suffrage amendment. Missouri women organized themselves into congressional districts. Suffragists in Missouri opened up headquarters in Jefferson City in order to lobby members of the Missouri General Assembly. Eventually, a bill to provide women the right to vote in a presidential election was proposed in both the Senate and the House. In attempting to influence lawmakers, suffragists provided politicians with maps showing how suffrage had increased throughout the U.S. They also took out ads in the newspapers. Unfortunately, the bill did not pass.

Suffragists again tried to petition for limited suffrage in 1917. While it passed the House, it did not pass the Senate in the general assembly. Later in the year, suffragists in Missouri worked to petition Missouri members of the House Rules Committee to create a House Committee on Women Suffrage. Suffragists continued to communicate with Missouri politicians and let them know that they expected them to support women's suffrage.

During World War I, suffrage groups in Missouri worked to help aid the war effort. The suffrage magazine, The Missouri Woman offered space to the Missouri Women's Division of the Council of National Defense where they printed war propaganda and news. Suffragist, Victoria Clay Haley, who chaired the Colored Women's Unit of the Council of National Defense, hosted a patriotic rally in St. Louis where more than 5,000 Black people attended.

== Presidential suffrage and ratification ==
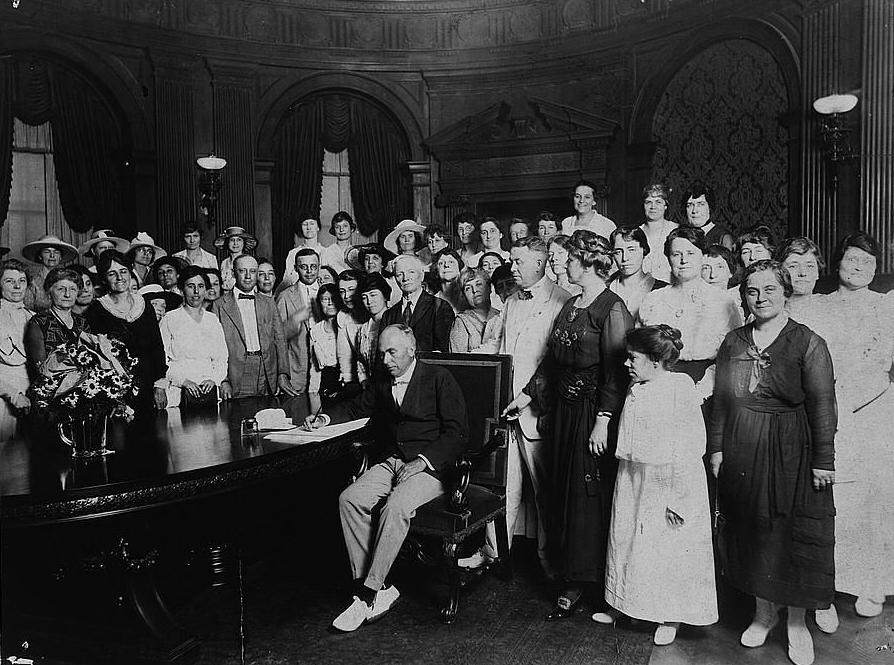
Ratifying suffrage in Missouri July 3, 1919

On January 8, 1919, the first bill introduced in the Missouri General Assembly was to allow women in Missouri to vote in presidential elections and was called "Bill Number One". The bill was introduced by a Jasper County representative, Walter E. Bailey in the House and in the Senate by James McKnight from Gentry County. In the Senate, there was some controversy over whether the bill would be able to pass and three women, Marie Ames, Alma Sasse, and Mrs. Wm. Haight, watched the proceedings and made sure that senators who might vote for suffrage would be on the floor during any votes. Bill Number One passed the Senate and on February 11, it passed the House with a vote of 122 to 8. After this, the bill went back for the final write up. Some anti-suffrage senators tried to attach amendments in hopes of killing the legislation, but they were unsuccessful. The proceedings stretched into March. In the week of March 23 to 29, 1919, NAWSA held their Golden Jubilee Convention in St. Louis. The final vote for the presidential bill was on March 28. Suffragists worked together to procure a special train for one of the senators who was pro-suffrage and was out-of-town. The bill passed the senate again by 21 to 12. On April 5, 1919, the Presidential Suffrage bill was signed by Governor Frederick D. Gardner while suffragists watched.

When the United States Congress passed the Nineteenth Amendment, suffrage leaders urged the states to call special legislative sessions for state ratification. In Kansas City on June 16, 1919, suffragists met at the Grand Avenue Temple to work on strategies to influence the ratification of the Nineteenth Amendment by Missouri. Suffragists lobbied the state government and met with Governor Gardner. They were able to persuade the governor to call a special legislative session in July. Missouri suffragists also contacted the state legislators to persuade them to ratify the amendment.

The day before the special session convened, suffrage groups, along with members of the Women's Christian Temperance Union (WCTU) hosted a suffrage luncheon and dinner. The dinner was also accompanied by speeches and had a general sense of celebration. On July 2, women lined the streets from the New Central Hotel to the Missouri Capitol, holding yellow umbrellas and wearing sashes and yellow flowers. That day the amendment passed the Missouri house by 125 to 4 and in the Senate by 29 to 3. During the proceedings the galleries were filled with suffragists. The next day, Governor Gardner signed the ratification bill.

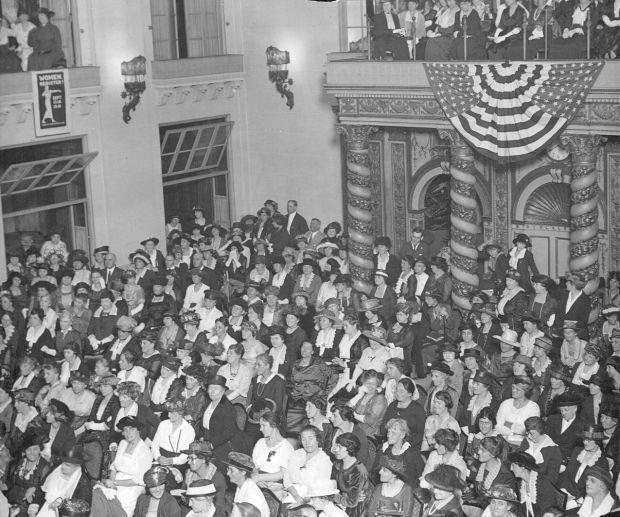
Missouri League of Women Voters at the Statler Hotel on Sep 9, 1920.

Women like Madeleine Liggett Clarke and Mary A. Kennedy began to hold "school for voters" which included classes on citizenship, history, law and other topics. Fannie C. Williams set up a suffrage school at the city's Black YWCA. Paid organizers went to women's homes to help prepare them for voting. The Missouri League of Women Voters (LWV Missouri) was created in October 1919 with Edna Gellhorn as the first president. The Missouri Woman Suffrage Association met at the Statler Hotel in St. Louis where the group changed its name to the LWV. The meeting had 500 attendees, both men and women, and was accompanied by speeches. The National League of Women Voters was established on February 14, 1920. Marie Ruoff Byrum became the first woman voter in Missouri on August 31, 1920.

== Anti-suffragists in Missouri ==
The anti-suffrage arguments in Missouri were often based on adhering to women's traditional roles. An 1872 letter to the editor published in the Warrenton Banner described suffragists as "Free Lovers and loose divorced people," and asserted that there were different roles for men and women. In 1887, Senator George G. Vest argued on the Senate floor that a women's place was "at home, not the ballot box."

In 1914, arguments against giving women the vote included the idea that it would cause an imbalance between rural and urban communities. It was proposed that urban areas would get a disproportionate amount of the vote and that this was undesirable. Minnie Bronson came to Missouri in 1916 in order to persuade state legislators against passing women's suffrage bills. She spent time with Missouri lawmakers telling unflattering, but interesting anecdotes about women.

== See also ==
- List of Missouri suffragists
- Timeline of women's suffrage in Missouri
- Women's suffrage in states of the United States
- Women's suffrage in the United States
