= Adaline Couzins =

British-American civil servant, suffragist, and nurse

- Born: Adaline Weston; August 12, 1815; Brighton, Sussex, England
- Died: May 9, 1892 (aged 76); St. Louis, Missouri, United States
- Resting place: Bellefontaine Cemetery, St. Louis
- Known for: suffragist and an American Civil War nurse
- Spouse: John Edward Decker Couzins (m. 1834)

Adaline Weston Couzins (August 12, 1815 – May 9, 1892) was a British-born American civil servant, a suffragist, and a Civil War nurse who worked for the Ladies' Union Aid Society of St. Louis. She spent most of her career as a nurse during the Civil War on hospital ships that tended to Union and Confederate soldiers all along the Mississippi River.

Adaline moved to St. Louis, Missouri, around 1823 from England and eventually married John Edward Decker Couzins in 1834. Adaline and John had four children. Their daughter, Phoebe Couzins, was one of the first female lawyers in the United States.

Adaline's first civil service was during the cholera epidemic of 1849 as she and her husband headed its relief corps. After Adaline heard of the Civil War she began working under Dr. Charles Pope, a surgeon in St. Louis. Adaline then joined the Ladies' Union Aid Society of St. Louis and was sent out to work in the field. While on the hospital ships she worked under Simon Pollack who was the chief surgeon for the Western Sanitary Commission.

While rescuing and caring for soldiers, Adaline was injured twice. She was first severely frostbitten in 1862 and then struck by a minie-ball fragment in 1863 at the siege of Vicksburg. Despite her injuries, Adaline continued her nursing duties. After the Civil War, Adaline continued on her work as a civil servant. She founded the Female Guardian Home of St. Louis, headed the Ladies' Sanitary Corps of the Special Health Department of St Louis, and campaigned for women's suffrage. Before her death, she was granted government pension on May 27, 1888, for her unrelenting services during the Civil War.

== Early and family life ==
Adaline Weston was born on August 12, 1815 in Brighton, England. Around 1823, at the age of eight, she relocated to St. Louis, Missouri with her parents. Several years after her move to St. Louis, she married John Edward Decker Couzins in 1834. John Couzins started his career as a carpenter, but later served as St. Louis's chief of police during the American Civil War, and from 1884 to 1887 he served as the U.S. marshal of the eastern district of Missouri. Adaline and John had four children together and their daughter, Phoebe Couzins was not only the first female graduate from Washington University School of Law in St. Louis, but was also one of the first female lawyers in the United States, an advocate for women's suffrage, and she was the first female U.S. Marshal.

== Early career ==
In 1849 there was a cholera epidemic in St. Louis, Missouri. During this time in U.S. history there were few hospitals established and not near enough nurses to handle an epidemic like this. That left the responsibility of caring for the sick to family members and volunteers.

Adaline and John were two of those volunteers, and headed the relief corps for this epidemic and worked tirelessly to nurse the sick back to health. This was just the first stepping stone of Adaline's long nursing career and civil service.

== Civil War nursing career ==
In April 1861, shortly after the start of the American Civil War, Adaline volunteered to work with Dr. Charles Pope, a surgeon in St. Louis. Together, with other volunteers, they transported wounded soldiers from trains to the New House of Refuge Hospital, where Adaline helped by washing and bandaging the soldier's wounds.

To continue her efforts in the war, Adaline joined the Ladies' Union Aid Society (LUAS) of St. Louis. Adaline worked closely with the society's president, Anna L. Clapp. She went on many missions to service and save soldiers while working with LUAS. Adaline was oftentimes sent out to battlefields to inspect their conditions and report the number of casualties, putting herself in great danger. Her volunteer efforts were not limited to her time on the battlefields though, as she began working on hospital ships under Dr. Simon Pollack, the chief surgeon for the Western Sanitary Commission, at the end of the American Civil War. These ships went all along the Mississippi River allowing her to tend to many soldiers in battle.

Adaline was praised by the doctors she serviced during this time for her work. She was not paid for her work. Adaline oftentimes paid her own travel expenses so that she was able to provide her services to the American soldiers.

=== Injuries during the War ===
In the winter of 1862, Adaline endured her first serious injury while working as a Civil War nurse. She suffered from serious frostbite after her and another LUAS member, Arethusa L. Forbes, went out to inspect the condition of a battlefield and report the number of casualties. Because of their efforts, hospital cars were sent to save those soldiers who were wounded but still alive. While Adaline recovered from the frostbite, Arethusa did not, and was unable to volunteer such services in the future.

While working on a hospital ship in 1863, Adaline was once again injured. The ship she was on had stopped in Vicksburg, Mississippi, to gather wounded soldiers to take back to St. Louis, and while she was there, Adaline was struck in the knee by minie-ball. Although her injury did not stop her from continuing her services as a nurse, it did cause her problems later in life.

== Post Civil War contributions ==
Even after the American Civil War ended, Adaline could not stop her career as a civil servant. She founded the Female Guardian Home of St. Louis and headed the Ladies' Sanitary Corps of the Special Health Department of St. Louis where she was able to continue her services as a nurse. Adaline also took part in campaigning for women's suffrage and advocated for women's rights.

== Later life ==
=== Government pension ===
Many people appreciated Adaline's service during the American Civil War and recognized the need to compensate her for her work. Both her daughter Phoebe Couzins and Michigan Senator Thomas W. Paler petitioned for Adaline to receive pension for her service in the war. During the debate for her pension in the Congressional House of Representatives it was said by Mr. O'Neill that she deserved the pension because she had done more "for the suffering, sick, and wounded soldiers, Confederate and Federal alike, than any other women in the Mississippi Valley". After debating the amount of money she would receive, Congress recognized her contributions in 1888. The bill, Bill No. 2356, was passed on October 1, 1888, granting Adaline Weston Couzins a government pension of $30 per month.

=== Final days ===
She died at age 76 in St. Louis, Missouri, on May 9, 1892, and is buried at Bellefontaine Cemetery in St. Louis.
