= Rebecca Naylor Hazard =

American philanthropist, suffragist, reformer and writer

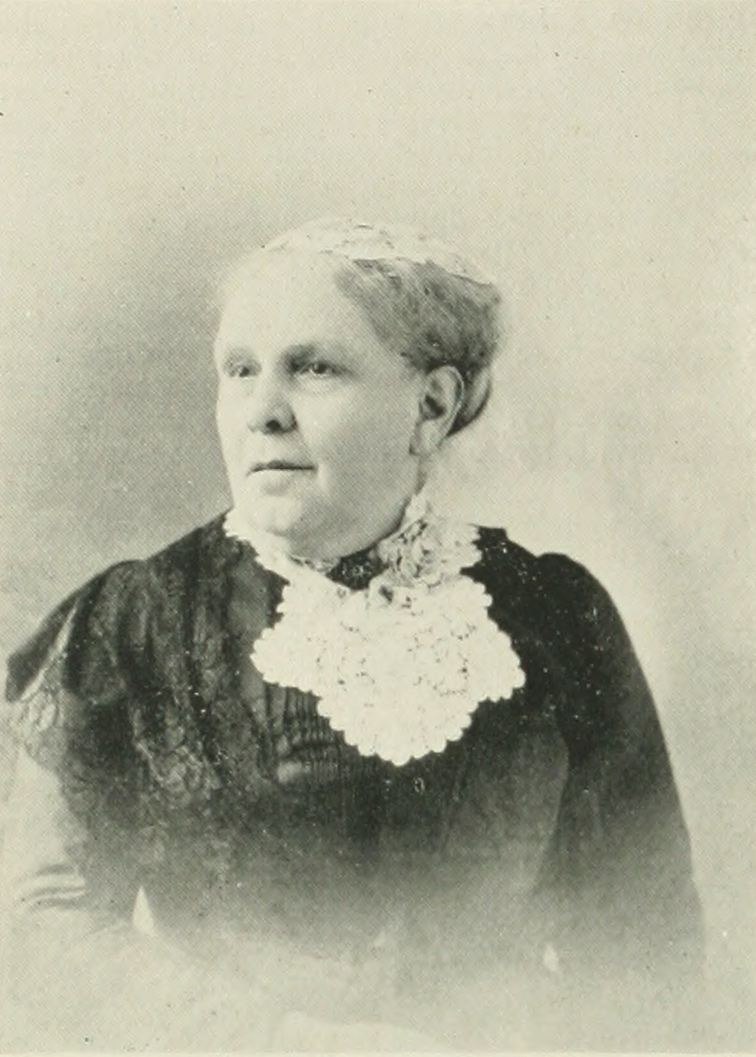
Rebecca Naylor Hazard, "A Woman of the Century"

Rebecca Naylor Hazard (née Rebecca Ann Naylor; November 10, 1826 – March 1, 1912) was a 19th-century American philanthropist, suffragist, reformer, and writer from the U.S. state of Ohio. With a few other women, she formed the Woman Suffrage Association of Missouri and an Industrial Home for Girls in St. Louis. She organized a society known as the Freedmen's Aid Society, and served as president of the American Woman Suffrage Association.

== Early life and education ==
Rebecca Ann Naylor was born in Woodsfield, Ohio, November 10, 1826, the daughter of Robert F. Naylor (born in Pennsylvania, but lived mostly in Virginia) and Mary Bettis Archbold (of Virginia). Until the age of 14, she studied at Monroe Institute and the Marietta Seminary. The family then removed to Cincinnati, Ohio, and later to Quincy, Illinois. In Quincy, in 1844, while still a teenager, she married William Tweedy Hazard, of Newport, Rhode Island.

== Career ==
The husband was not a college man. His occupation during most of his life was that of a manufacturer (flour mills). Five children were born to the couple. In 1850, the family removed to St. Louis, Missouri. For many years, domestic affairs claimed the attention of Hazard.

=== Philanthropist ===
In 1854, she united with other women in establishing an Industrial Home for Girls in St. Louis. For five years she was on the board of managers of that institution, which has sheltered thousands of homeless children. At the breaking out of the American Civil War, Hazard, who was an ardent Unionist, engaged in hospital work, including the care of sick and wounded soldiers. She helped to organize the Union Aid Society and served as a member of the executive committee in the great Western Sanitary Fair. Finding that large numbers of African American women and children were by the exigencies of war helplessly stranded in the city, Hazard sought means for their relief. They were in a deplorable condition, and, as the supplies contributed to the soldiers could not be used for them, she organized a society known as the Freedmen's Aid Society, for their special benefit. At the close of the war, that society was merged in an orphan asylum. Closely following that work came the establishment of a home for women, which was maintained under great difficulties for some years, before being abandoned. With Mary Foote Henderson, Hazard co-founded the School of Design for women in the field of decorative art. It later became part of the Woman's Exchange.

=== Suffragist and writer ===
Deeply impressed with the disabilities under which women labor in being deprived of political rights, Hazard, Virginia Minor, Anna Clapp, Lucretia Hall, and Penelope Allen, met in May 1867, and formed the Woman Suffrage Association of Missouri, the first society bearing the name, and having for its sole object the ballot for woman.

Devoted to this cause, Hazard gave it her attention for many years, filling the various offices of the association, and also serving one term as president of the American Woman Suffrage Association. She authored the popular suffragist song, "Give the Ballot to the Mothers" which was sung by a choir at the first convention of the Kentucky Equal Rights Association in November 1889.

In 1870, the city of St. Louis framed into law the Social Evil Ordinance, which legalized and set out to regulate prostitution. Hazard, who disagreed with the statute on a moral level, advocated against it in both public and private scenes. Three years later, she met with other women and organized an appeal to the legislature through a petition campaign to rescind it.

The law was repealed by the Missouri Legislature in 1874. The call for the formation of the association for the advancement of women, known as the Woman's Congress, was signed by Hazard, and she continued to be a member of that body, contributing at various times to its sessions the following papers: "Home Studies for Women," "Business Opportunities for Women," and "Crime and its Punishment."

== Personal life ==
In 1844, Rebecca Naylor married William T. Hazard (1812-1879), of Newport, Rhode Island. Five children were born to this union, among whom: Charles F. Hazard (1847-1877), Nathaniel Hazard (1848-1928), William T. Hazard (1851-1914). In 1850, the family moved to St. Louis, Missouri.

After the death of her husband, in 1879, Hazard mostly retired from public work, but at her home in Kirkwood, Missouri, a suburb of St. Louis, a class of women met each week for study and mutual improvement. As a result of these studies, Hazard published two papers on the "Divina Commedia." She also wrote a volume on the war period in St. Louis. Her contributions to local and other papers were numerous. Hazard was a member of the Woman's Christian Temperance Union and of the American Akademe, a philosophical society having headquarters in Jacksonville, Illinois. She died in Kirkwood in 1912.

She died on March 1, 1912, aged 85, and is buried at Bellefontaine Cemetery, St. Louis, Missouri.
