= St. Louis Ladies' Union Aid Society =

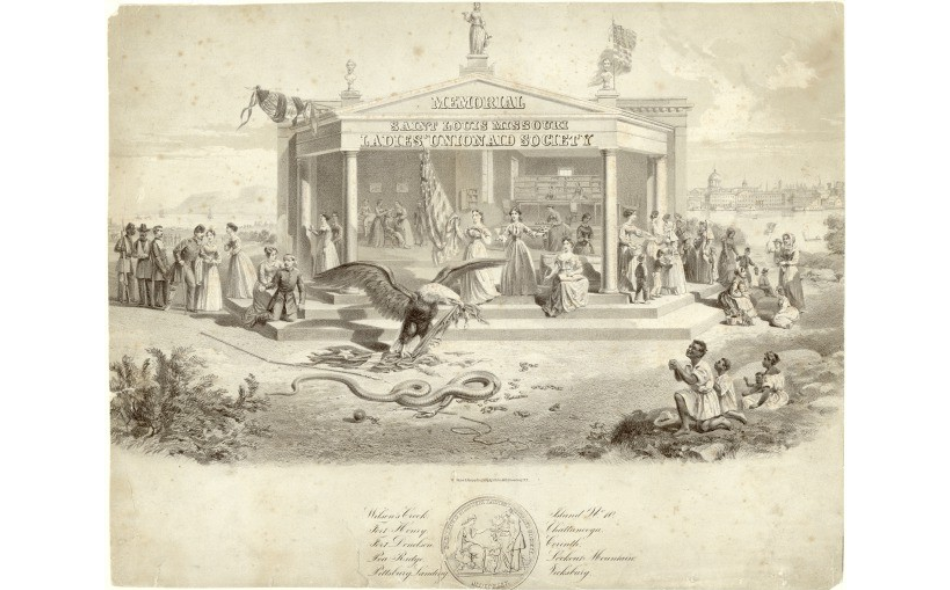
Memorial, St. Louis Ladies' Union Aid Society, 1868 Steel Engraving, Majors and Knapp Missouri History Museum http://collections.mohistory.org/resource/155181

St. Louis Ladies' Union Aid Society was formed on August 2, 1861. During the American Civil War, ladies' aid societies formed across the country to provide medical services and supplies to soldiers. In St. Louis, they partnered with the Western Sanitary Commission in bringing aid to Union soldiers across the state.

== History ==
The St. Louis chapter of the Ladies' Union Aid Society was organized by twenty-five Unionist women in response to the Battle of Wilson's Creek. Wounded soldiers were in need of clean clothes and bandages, and founding member Adaline Weston Couzins sent them supplies by train. The founding women were united by national loyalty despite being located in a divided border city in slave-state Missouri. The Society grew to more than 200 members during the Civil War.

== Members ==
Anna L. Clapp served as the only president of the St. Louis Ladies' Union Aid Society. Through the U.S. surgeon general, Clapp obtained contracts to secure medical supplies and encouraged other Unionist women to work in military hospitals. Other members of this chapter included Margaret Breckinridge, activist Jessie Benton Fremont and lawyer Phoebe Couzins. Abolitionist Mary Meachum later headed the Colored Ladies Soldiers' Aid Society in St. Louis in 1864, assisting escaped slaves and black Union soldiers.
