= USS Red Rover =

Hospital steamship of the American Civil War

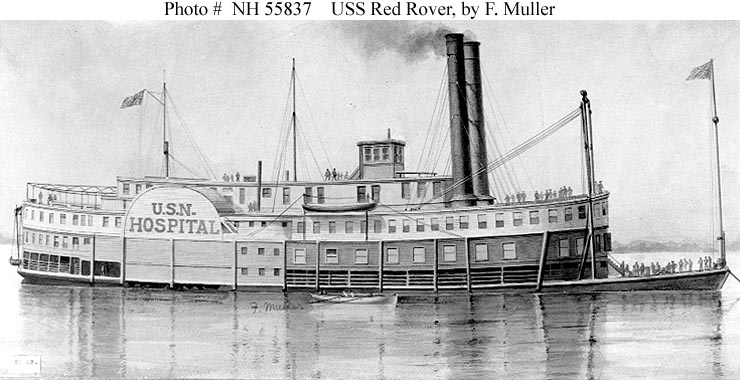
- USS Red Rover

History

United States
- Name: USS Red Rover
- Launched: 1859
- Acquired: 30 September 1862
- Commissioned: circa 26 October 1862
- Decommissioned: 17 November 1865
- Captured: circa 25 March 1862
- Fate: Sold, 29 November 1865

General characteristics
- Type: Steamer / Hospital ship
- Displacement: 650 long tons (660 t)
- Length: 256 ft (78 m)
- Draft: 8 ft (2.4 m)
- Propulsion: Steam engine; side wheel-propelled
- Speed: 8 kn (9.2 mph; 15 km/h)
- Complement: crew of 47; medical department 30+
- Armament: 1 × 32-pounder gun

USS Red Rover was a 650-ton Confederate States of America steamer that the United States Navy captured. After refitting the vessel, the Union used it as a hospital ship during the American Civil War.

Red Rover became the U.S. Navy's first hospital ship, serving the Mississippi Squadron until the end of the American Civil War. Her medical complement included nurses from the Catholic order Sisters of the Holy Cross, the first volunteer females to serve on board a Navy ship. In addition to caring for and transporting sick and wounded men, she provided medical supplies to Navy ships along the Western Rivers.

== Service under the Confederacy ==
Red Rover was a side-wheel steamer built in 1859 at Cape Girardeau, Missouri. The Confederacy purchased her on 7 November 1861, and initially put her to use as a barracks ship for the floating battery at New Orleans, Louisiana. Serving from 15 March 1862, at Island Number Ten, near New Madrid, Missouri, she was holed by Union fire during a bombardment of that island sometime before 25 March, leading the Confederates to abandon her as a barracks ship.

== Captured by the Union Army ==
When the island fell to Union forces on 7 April, the Union gunboat USS Mound City captured Red Rover. The Union forces repaired her, fitting her out as a summer hospital ship for the Army's Western Flotilla. Her role was to augment the limited Union medical facilities, to minimize the hazards to sick and wounded in fighting ships, and to facilitate delivery of medical supplies to and evacuation of personnel from forward areas.

== Civil War care of the sick and wounded ==
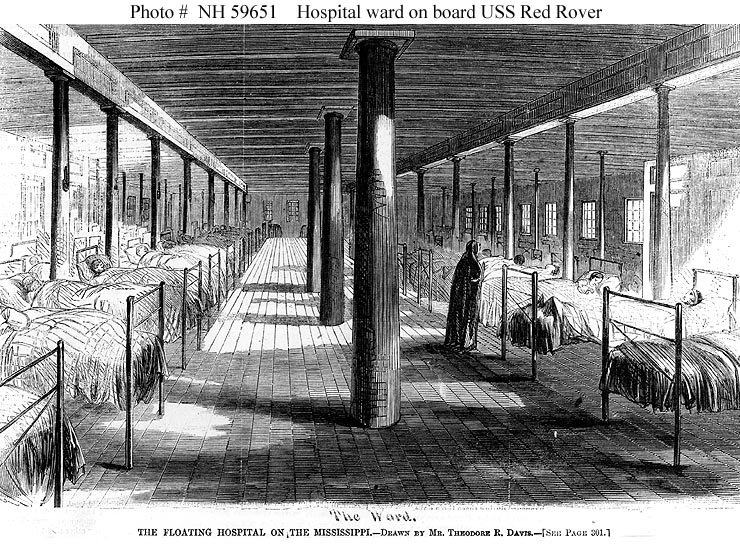
Hospital ward on Red Rover

At the time of Red Rover's commissioning as a hospital ship, the Union was already using steamers such as the City of Memphis as medical transports to carry casualties upriver. However, these transports lacked necessary sanitary accommodations and medical staff, and thus were unable to prevent the spread of disease. Barges, housed over or covered with canvas, were ordered for the care of contagious diseases, primarily smallpox, and were moored in shady spots along the river.

Rapid mobilization at the start of the Civil War had vitiated efforts to prevent the outbreak and epidemic communication of disease on both sides of the conflict. Vaccination was slow; sanitation and hygiene were generally poor. Overworked military medical personnel were assisted by voluntary societies coordinated by the U.S. Sanitary Commission founded in June 1861. But by 1865, typhoid fever, typhus, dysentery, diarrhea, cholera, smallpox, measles, and malaria would claim more lives than gunshot.

== Conversion to hospital ship ==
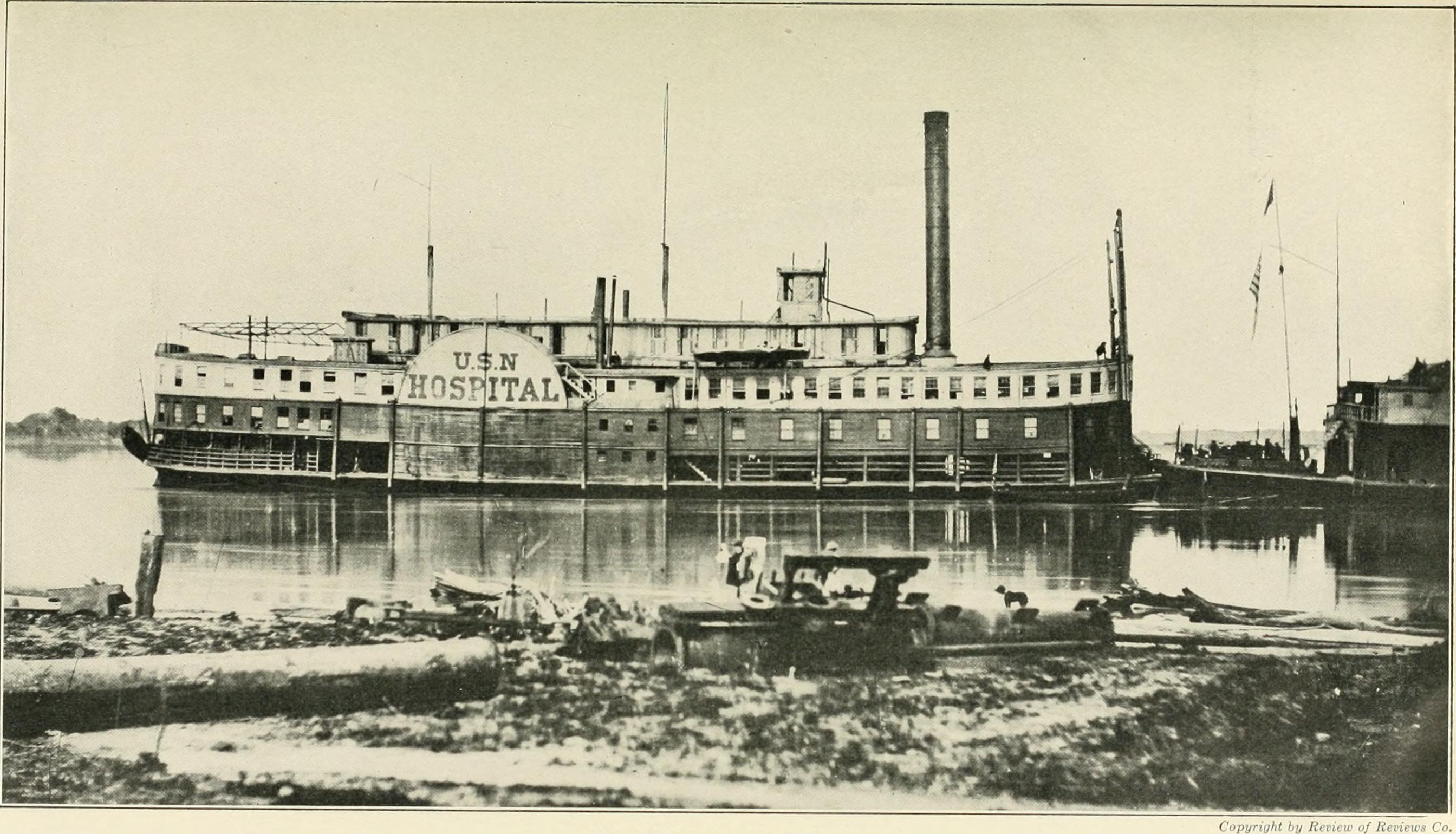
Red Rover

Red Rover, serving first with the Union Army, then with the Union Navy, drew on both military and voluntary medical personnel. Her conversion to a hospital boat, begun at St. Louis, Missouri, and completed at Cairo, Illinois, was undertaken by the Western Sanitary Commission with both sanitation and comfort in mind. A separate operating room was installed and equipped. A galley was put below, providing separate kitchen facilities for the patients. The cabin aft was opened for better air circulation. A steam boiler was added for laundry purposes. An elevator, numerous bathrooms, nine water closets, and gauze window blinds " ... to keep cinders and smoke from annoying the sick" were also included in the work.

== Civil War service ==
=== Mound City hospital service ===
On 10 June 1862, Red Rover was ready for service. Her commanding officer was Captain McDaniel of the Army's Gunboat Service. Assistant Surgeon George H. Bixby became Surgeon in Charge.

On 11 June, Red Rover received her first patient, a cholera victim and American Union seaman from the gunboat USS Benton named David Sans who became the first patient taken aboard the first hospital ship in American history. By the 14th, she had 55 patients. On the 17th, Mound City exploded during an engagement with Confederate batteries at St. Charles, Arkansas. Casualties amounted to 135 out of a complement of 175. Red Rover, dispatched to assist in the emergency, took on board extreme burn and wound cases at Memphis, Tennessee, and transported them to less crowded hospitals in Illinois.

=== Vicksburg, Mississippi, hospital service ===
From Mound City, Illinois, the hospital ship moved down-stream again and joined the Western Flotilla above Vicksburg, Mississippi. Through the summer, she treated the flotilla's sick and wounded while the Ram Fleet engaged at Vicksburg and along the Mississippi River to Helena, Arkansas. While off Helena, Red Rover caught fire, but — with assistance from the gunboat Benton — she extinguished the blaze and continued her work.

=== Transferred to the Union Navy's Mississippi operating area ===
In September 1862, Red Rover — still legally under the jurisdiction of an Illinois prize court — was sent to Cairo to be winterized. The Navy purchased her on the 30th. The next day, the Union transferred the vessels of the Western Flotilla, with their officers and men, to the Navy Department to serve as the Mississippi Squadron under acting Rear Adm. David Dixon Porter. The Navy Medical Department of Western Waters was organized at the same time under Fleet Surg. Edward Gilchrist.

In December Red Rover, used during the fall to alleviate crowded medical facilities ashore, was ready for service on the river. On the 26th, she was commissioned under the command of Acting Master William R. Wells, USN. Her complement was 47, while her medical department, remaining under Assistant Surgeon Bixby, was initially about 30. Of that number, three were Sisters of the Order of the Holy Cross, later joined by a fourth member of their order. The Red Rover also hosted 5 African-American former slaves who were enlisted as "Boys" and were paid to serve as Nurses in the Navy, and these women: Ann Bradford Stokes, Ellen Campbell, Alice Kennedy, Sarah Kinno and Betsy Young (later became Young Fowler) were the forerunners and pre-dated the formation of the Navy Nurse Corps. These women were the forerunners of the U.S. Navy Nurse Corps. The Western Sanitation Commission, which also donated over $3,000 worth of equipment to the ship, coordinated the work of these and other volunteers. Five of the women who served as nurses on the ship with the Sisters were five former slaves, including Stokes, who had volunteered their service to the Navy.

In December 1862, Fleet Surg. Ninian A. Pinckney relieved Fleet Surg. Gilchrist. Pinckney imposed such strict standards on the department's day-to-day activities and ran them so well run from his headquarters in Red Rover that by 1865, he was able to claim

there is less ... sickness in the Fleet than in the healthiest portion of the globe.

=== Supporting the White River expedition ===
On the 29th, Red Rover headed downstream. During January 1863, she served with the expedition up the White River. While the expedition took the Post of Arkansas (Fort Hindman), she remained at the mouth of the river to receive the wounded. On her departure, she was fired on and two shots penetrated into the hospital area, but caused no casualties.

From February to the fall of Vicksburg early in July, she cared for the sick and wounded of that campaign and supplemented her medical support of Union forces by provisioning other ships of the Mississippi Squadron with ice and fresh meat. She also provided burial details and sent medical personnel ashore when and where needed.

Red Rover continued her service along the river, taking on sick and wounded and delivering medicine and supplies until the fall of 1864. In October of that year, she began her last supply run. After delivering medical stores to ships at Helena and on the White, Red, and Yazoo Rivers, she transferred patients to Hospital Pinckney at Memphis and headed north.

== Post-war decommissioning ==
Arriving at Mound City on 11 December, she remained there, caring for Navy patients, until she was decommissioned on 17 November 1865. Having admitted over 2,400 patients during her career, she transferred her last 11 to Grampus on that date. On 29 November, she was sold at public auction to A. M. Carpenter.

== Legacy ==
When accessioned recruits to the United States Navy arrive at Recruit Training Center, Great Lakes, Illinois, the first Branch Medical Clinic they visit is named BMC Red Rover. It is there that recruits get their first inoculations, immunizations, optometry screenings, female examinations, and dental screenings.

== See also ==
- Hospital Ships of the Sanitary Commission
- Anaconda Plan
