= Virginia Minor =

American suffragist (1824–1894)

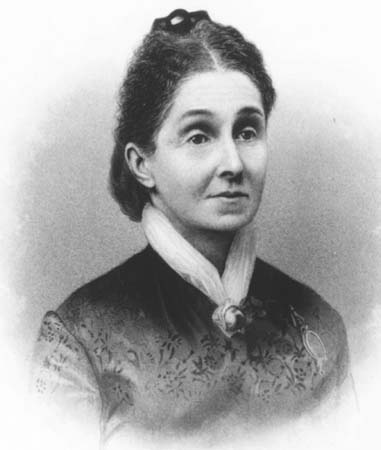
- Born: March 27, 1824; Caroline County, Virginia, US
- Died: August 14, 1894 (aged 70); St. Louis, Missouri, US
- Burial place: Bellefontaine Cemetery
- Known for: First president of the Woman's Suffrage Association of Missouri 1867
- Spouse: Francis Minor (m. 1843)
- Children: 1

Virginia Louisa Minor (March 27, 1824 – August 14, 1894) was an American women's suffrage activist in Missouri. She is best remembered as the plaintiff in Minor v. Happersett, an 1875 United States Supreme Court case in which Minor unsuccessfully argued that the Fourteenth Amendment to the United States Constitution gave women the right to vote. And the first president of the Women's suffrage Association in Missouri.

== Life ==
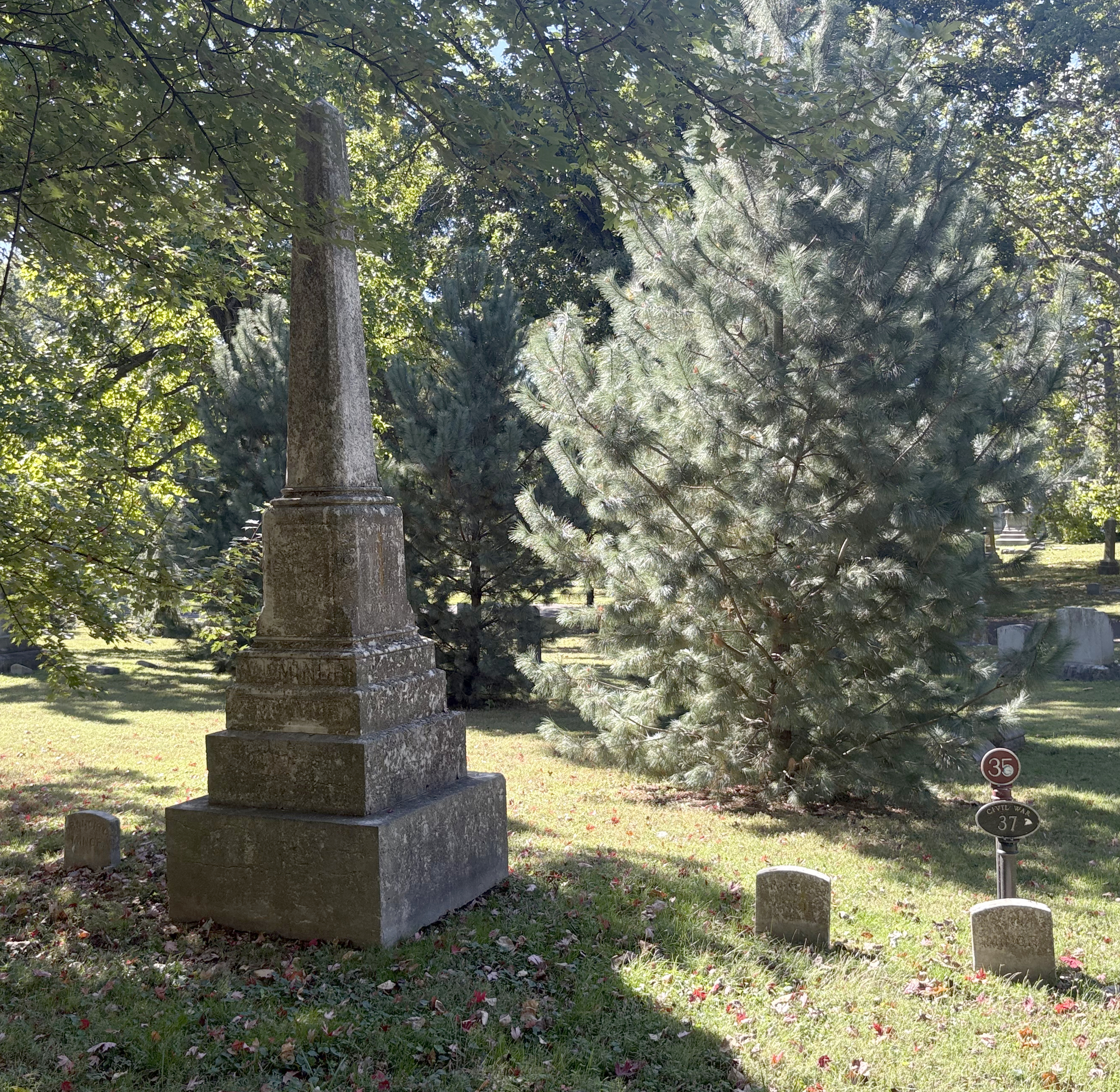
Graves of Virginia and Francis Minor at Bellefontaine Cemetery

Minor was born in Caroline County, Virginia on March 27, 1824. the second of seven children of Warner and Maria Timberlake Minor.

Minor married her distant cousin Francis Minor in 1843; they settled in St. Louis in 1844. During the American Civil War, Minor was an active member of the St. Louis Ladies' Union Aid Society that later became the Western Sanitary Commission. She got pregnant and had her first child in 1852; who was only 14 years old when he died from a bullet in 1866. When the war ended Minor and other labored women demonstration of citizenship, along with the Republican Party supporting expansion of citizenship to the reconstruction in the Civil war aftermath would help to acquire similar rights for women.

In 1867, Minor co-founded and became the first president of the Woman's Suffrage Association of Missouri (later an affiliate of the American Woman Suffrage Association). The Women's Suffrage Association of Missouri was the first organization created with the specific aim of enfranchising women. Minor personally sided with the National Woman's Suffrage Association, prompting her resignation as President of the Missouri Association. At an 1869 convention in St. Louis, Minor stated that "the Constitution of the United States gives me every right and privilege to which every other citizen is entitled." Later that year, Francis and Virginia Minor drafted and circulated pamphlets arguing for women's suffrage based on the newly passed Fourteenth Amendment.

On October 15, 1872, Virginia Minor attempted to register to vote in St. Louis. When election registrar Reese Happersett turned her down, Virginia (represented by Francis) filed suit in the Missouri state courts. The trial court, Missouri Supreme Court, and United States Supreme Court all ruled in favor of the state of Missouri. The Supreme Court unanimously held "that the Constitution of the United States does not confer the right of suffrage upon any one", and that the decision of who should be entitled to vote was left to the legislative branch.

While the women's rights movement was pressing for the reform of married women's legal status in the North, no such organized movement would materialize in Missouri, a slaveholding state. What was possible was the "creative" use of standing laws-that is, making use of a law that, while technically legal, subverted the law's general intent that rendered women legal non-entities. Everything that needed to happen was some legal expertise on the part of Francis Minor and then being willing to give up his status as "lord and master" to be able to bestow on his wife her legal personality. We see this strategy at work in May 1846 when Francis Minor bound his trustee in a way calculated to move Virginia Minor as close as possible to being a completely empowered individual in her own right. The trustee was to hold the property in trust only until such time as Virginia Minor determined to "sell, mortgage, devise, bequeath or otherwise dispose of the same or any part thereof at her will and pleasure". Virginia Minor was further empowered to "at any time revoke the power of the old and appoint a new trustee". If the trustee should fail to carry out her will, she could change trustees until she found one that would do so to her satisfaction.

When a St. Louis chapter of the National Woman Suffrage Association was established in 1879, Minor was elected president of a suffrage group once more. Virginia Minor testified in support of women's suffrage before the United States Senate in 1889. Minor was chosen to serve as the organization's president once more after the two associations were unified in 1890. She remained in this role until 1892, when her poor health compelled her to resign. She died on August 14, 1894, two years later, and was laid to rest at St. Louis' Bellefontaine Cemetery.

== Legacy ==
In December 2013 Minor was announced as an inductee to the Hall of Famous Missourians. Her bronze bust was unveiled in 2014 as one of forty-four on permanent display in the Missouri State Capitol in Jefferson City.

Minor was named an honoree of the National Women's History Alliance in 2020.

Although the Minors demonstrated operate as a partnership to women's rights in Missouri, Virginia Minor is credited to their efforts. Even Susan B. Anthony, who knew them both well, when asked to write an encyclopedia entry for Virginia Minor, attributed the jointly conceived, filed, and argued the legal case to Virginia Minor alone. Perhaps we chary recognize great women showing that there might be a great man behind every great woman. Historians do discuss the rise of a more companionate relationship between husbands and wives, as far back as the American Revolution, but there are fewer documents were the husbands choosing to put their wives' causes first. "Historians seem to find the idea that men might, at the expense of their gender privilege, take a stand for the emancipation of women, puzzling, if not inexplicable". Francis Minor was one such man, a "women's rights man." As we will see, it was the gender equality that the Minors practiced at home for more than twenty years as a married couple—not the inequality between them—that underwrote their eventual emergence as the leading advocates of women's suffrage in the state.

Virginia Minor is recognized as the first person to publicly advocate for women's suffrage in her state. In 1867, she circulated a petition to the state legislature, requesting that a proposed amendment allowing African American men to vote be expanded to include women as well.

Unlike the northeastern part of the country, St. Louis had no organized movement for women's rights in 1845. The first organized agitation for women's rights to emerge in the North did so in connection with efforts to abolish slavery. It is not surprising, then, that the organized movement in Missouri for women's emancipation did not emerge until well into the Civil War-ten years after Virginia and Francis first moved to St. Louis, and twenty years after the slaves were emancipated.

== See also ==
- History of women's suffrage in the United States
- Nineteenth Amendment to the United States Constitution
- List of suffragists and suffragettes
- Timeline of women's suffrage

== Sources ==
- Whites, LeeAnn; Neth, Mary C.; Kremer, Gary R., eds. (2014). Women in Missouri History: In Search of Power and Influence. University of Missouri Press. ISBN 978-0-8262-6413-8. Project MUSE book 28600.
