= Hospital Ships of the Sanitary Commission =

Hospital Ships of the U.S. Sanitary Commission
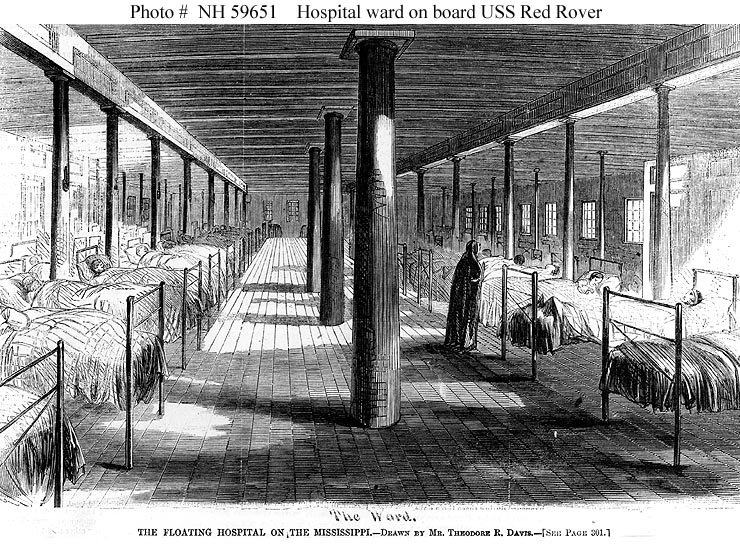
- Hospital ward on the USS Red Rover (Theodore R. Davis, Harper's Weekly, 1863).

Site history
- Built: Prior to and during the American Civil War
- In use: 1861–1866

Frederick Law Olmsted, the executive director of the United States Sanitary Commission, set up a system of hospital ships for wounded and sick soldiers during the American Civil War. The USSC was a private agency that cooperated closely with the U.S. Army.

== City of Memphis and Fanny Bullit ==
Between 6 and 16 February 1862, Union Army troops advanced across the United States to capture Forts Henry and Donelson. In response to news reports of these combat engagements, members of the U.S. Sanitary Commission who were stationed in Cincinnati, Ohio, began to gather supplies and recruit volunteers to help distribute those supplies and render care to ailing and injured soldiers. Procuring a steamer to transport the most senior members of their commission members to Fort Donelson, they realized upon arrival that the City of Memphis and Fanny Bullitt were essentially empty vessels on which vast numbers of wounded were suffering despite the fact that both vessels had been placed into service as hospital ships. After quickly distributing supplies and beginning their care of the wounded, they then prepared 80 wounded for immediate steamer transport back to Cincinnati with doctors and nurses to tend to them on their voyage. That steamer then also traveled on to additional sites to render further aid to other soldiers who had fallen ill or been wounded at other Union duty stations.

== Tycoon and Monarch ==
In April 1862, the Union's victory at Shiloh resulted in the outpouring of hospital transports to the city. The two transports refitted and dispatched by the Sanitary Commission were joined by a fleet of private, army, and state hospital ships. The Tycoon and Monarch were the commission's first refitted hospital ships. Sympathy, benevolence, patriotism and a desire to ease the suffering of their nation's troops was the only thing these groups shared in common. Following this event, the Sanitary Commission began outfitting any hospital ship, army, state, association, or voluntary, and if necessary, they operated the ships as well. All of the army's ships used as hospital transports were refitted and initially supplied through the direction of the Sanitary Commission. Funding came from the army, Sanitary Commission, state, and volunteer organizations. The army transferred at least one ship to the Sanitary Commission, the steamer Daniel Webster No. 1. Even the Red Rover, a river boat captured by the Union Army, was well equipped and initially staffed by the Sanitary Commission until the ship was sold to the navy.

== St. Philip ==
These were not the first hospital ships employed by the Civil War governments; previous ships used as hospitals, like the hospital ship CSS St. Philip (formerly the Star of the West) in September 1861 and April 1862, retained patients for long periods of time (30–90 days easily) and stayed on station rarely travelling. The Sanitary Commission used their steamers as a means of bringing wounded further back behind supply lines, keeping wounded on board for as short a time as possible, from 1–7 days. Men and women of all races, some hired while others volunteered, served throughout the hospital ships and hospitals of the Union as nurses.

The Western Sanitary Commission was a private agency based in St. Louis that was a rival of the larger U.S. Sanitary Commission, doing much the same work. It was led by abolitionists and focused more on the needs of Freedmen.

== The Hospital Transport Service ==
The Sanitary Commission, at the request of the army, created the Hospital Transport Service. It acquired 16 medium and large boats and converted them to hospital ships. Its first major operations came in the Peninsular Campaign of spring 1862, when it serviced casualties from General McClellan's Army of 100,000 men after a series of battles.

The Sanitary Commission quickly organized large fleets of ships and created a network system of routes to move wounded. Rivers and ocean connecting the Union became highway over which the wounded steadily traveled further North.

When possible, few embarkation points were used. Ships were assigned schedules and maximum patient allowances. If a ship embarked more patients than allowed, even though space permitted, her crew would be required to notify the receiving station. Several ships were kept in reserve, used only when another ship was unable to continue to make a journey. Thus a very predictable and organized system grew. On the Pamunkey River, 19 hospital transports working on a fixed schedule moved 700 wounded a day. Of particular interest, the ships had far greater capacity, some 600 more wounded could have been crammed onto some of the ships. But, this was frowned upon by the organizers as such a number would overcrowd the ship, overtask the medical staff, erode the quality of care, and place an unexpected burden on the receiving hospital. Thus, in theory some 70,000 wounded could be moved from Virginia in 100 days to hospitals in five states as far north as New York. A second inland force of about 16 hospital ships moved patients along riverways north to Missouri, Ohio, and Kentucky.

=== Hospital ships and boats of the Peninsula Campaign ===
Name	Type	Year; built	Ton.; (Note: Gross register tonnage.)	Cap.; (Note: Cap. = Capacity, ie, number of wounded or sick the ship or boat could hold.)	Embarkation Area	Disembarkation Area	Transport Days	Note
S.R. Spaulding	Steamship	1859	1090		Fortress Monroe	New York	7	
Daniel Webster No. 1	Steamship	1851	1035		Fortress Monroe	New York	7	Former Army, saw service at Yorktown
Empress	Steamboat			400	York River	Fortress Monroe	2	
Imperial	Steamboat			400	York River	Fortress Monroe	2	Outfitted in St. Louis
Ocean Queen	Steamship	1858	2801	400	James River	Fortress Monroe	2	
Wilson Small	Steamboat	1851	258	400	James River	Fortress Monroe	2	
Elizabeth	Steam barge			n/a	Fortress Monroe	York and James River	n/a	Storeboat
Elm City	Steamboat	1855	760	400	Pamunkey River	Philadelphia	6	
Commodore	Steamboat	1848	984	400	Pamunkey River	Maryland	4	
C. Vanderbilt	Steamboat	1847	1041	400	Pamunkey River	Maryland	4	(Note: See note to Cornelius Vanderbilt.) (Note: Referred to only as Vanderbilt in Olmsted's correspondence, an abbreviation which led to Censer misidentifying the steamer as USS Vanderbilt, the only steamer of that name listed in official documents of the era.)
Louisiana	Steamboat			400	Pamunkey River	Maryland	4	
State of Maine	Steamboat	1848	806	400	Pamunkey River	Maryland	4	
Kennebeck	Steamboat	1845	480	300	Pamunkey River	Virginia	2	
Daniel Webster No. 2	Steamboat	1853	766	300	Pamunkey River	Virginia	2	
John Brooks	Steamboat	1859	780	400	Pamunkey River	n/a	n/a	In Reserve
Wilmon Whillden	Steamboat	1845	241	400	Pamunkey River	n/a	n/a	In Reserve
Knickerbocker	Steamboat	1843	858	400	Pamunkey River	n/a	n/a	In Reserve
St. Mark	Ship	1860	1448		Pamunkey River	n/a	n/a	Stationary
Euterpe	Clipper	1854	1985		Pamunkey River	n/a	n/a	Stationary

== Hospital boats of the Sanitary Commission ==
- Fanny Bullitt (Ohio River)
- City of Alton
- Crescent City
- Ruth
- Glasgow
- Diana
- Nebraska
- Champion
- Baltic
- J. S. Cairns
- Ben Franklin
- Continental
- Hazel Dell
- Bickerdyke
- Tycoon (Shiloh - Cincinnati)
- Monarch (Shiloh - Cincinnati)

== Ships outfitted by Sanitary Commission but transferred to Army ==
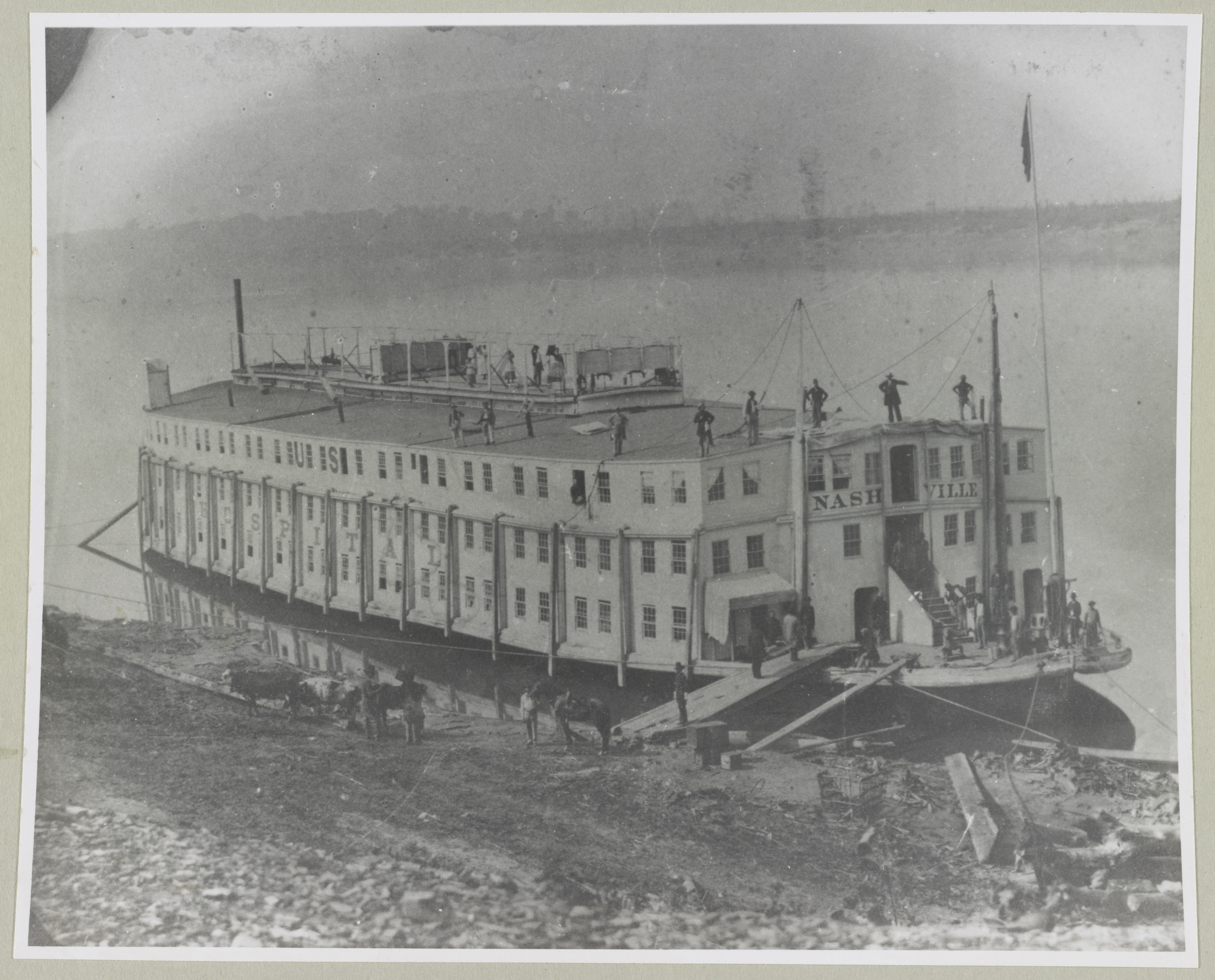
Hospital ship, Nashville, photographed c. 1861–1865.

- Red Rover (Mississippi River) later transferred to Navy
- City of Memphis (Ohio River)
- City of Nashville
- City of Louisiana, Renamed R. C. Wood (Ohio River)
- D. A. January*
