= List of United States Supreme Court cases, volume 88 =

Supreme Court of the United States
- Interactive map of Supreme Court of the United States
- 38°53′26″N 77°00′16″W
- Established: March 4, 1789; 236 years ago
- Location: Washington, D.C.
- Coordinates: 38°53′26″N 77°00′16″W
- Composition method: Presidential nomination with Senate confirmation
- Authorised by: Constitution of the United States, Art. III, § 1
- Judge term length: life tenure, subject to impeachment and removal
- Number of positions: 9 (by statute)
- Website: supremecourt.gov

This is a list of cases reported in volume 88 (21 Wall.) of United States Reports, decided by the Supreme Court of the United States in 1874 and 1875.

== Nominative reports ==
In 1874, the U.S. government created the United States Reports, and retroactively numbered older privately published case reports as part of the new series. As a result, cases appearing in volumes 1–90 of U.S. Reports have dual citation forms; one for the volume number of U.S. Reports, and one for the volume number of the reports named for the relevant reporter of decisions (these are called "nominative reports").

=== John William Wallace ===
Starting with the 66th volume of U.S. Reports, the Reporter of Decisions of the Supreme Court of the United States was John William Wallace. Wallace was Reporter of Decisions from 1863 to 1874, covering volumes 68 through 90 of United States Reports which correspond to volumes 1 through 23 of his Wallace's Reports. As such, the dual form of citation to, for example, Dupasseur v. Rochereau is 88 U.S. (21 Wall.) 130 (1875).

Wallace's Reports were the final nominative reports for the US Supreme Court; starting with volume 91, cases were identified simply as "(volume #) U.S. (page #) (year)".

== Justices of the Supreme Court at the time of 88 U.S. (21 Wall.) ==
The Supreme Court is established by Article III, Section 1 of the Constitution of the United States, which says: "The judicial Power of the United States, shall be vested in one supreme Court . . .". The size of the Court is not specified; the Constitution leaves it to Congress to set the number of justices. Under the Judiciary Act of 1789 Congress originally fixed the number of justices at six (one chief justice and five associate justices). Since 1789 Congress has varied the size of the Court from six to seven, nine, ten, and back to nine justices (always including one chief justice).

When the cases in 88 U.S. (21 Wall.) were decided the Court comprised the following nine members:

| Portrait | Justice | Office | Home State | Succeeded | Date confirmed by the Senate (Vote) | Tenure on Supreme Court |
|---|---|---|---|---|---|---|
| | Morrison Waite | Chief Justice | Ohio | Salmon P. Chase | January 21, 1874 (63–0) | March 4, 1874 – March 23, 1888 (Died) |
| | Nathan Clifford | Associate Justice | Maine | Benjamin Robbins Curtis | January 12, 1858 (26–23) | January 21, 1858 – July 25, 1881 (Died) |
| | Noah Haynes Swayne | Associate Justice | Ohio | John McLean | January 24, 1862 (38–1) | January 27, 1862 – January 24, 1881 (Retired) |
| | Samuel Freeman Miller | Associate Justice | Iowa | Peter Vivian Daniel | July 16, 1862 (Acclamation) | July 21, 1862 – October 13, 1890 (Died) |
| | David Davis | Associate Justice | Illinois | John Archibald Campbell | December 8, 1862 (Acclamation) | December 10, 1862 – March 4, 1877 (Resigned) |
| | Stephen Johnson Field | Associate Justice | California | newly created seat | March 10, 1863 (Acclamation) | May 10, 1863 – December 1, 1897 (Retired) |
| | William Strong | Associate Justice | Pennsylvania | Robert Cooper Grier | February 18, 1870 (No vote recorded) | March 14, 1870 – December 14, 1880 (Retired) |
| | Joseph P. Bradley | Associate Justice | New Jersey | newly created seat | March 21, 1870 (46–9) | March 23, 1870 – January 22, 1892 (Died) |
| | Ward Hunt | Associate Justice | New York | Samuel Nelson | December 11, 1872 (Acclamation) | January 9, 1873 – January 27, 1882 (Retired) |

== Notable Case in 88 U.S. (21 Wall.) ==
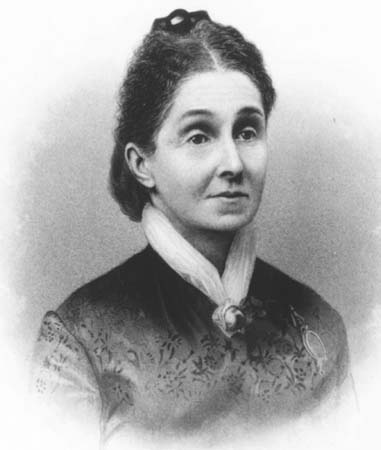
Virginia Minor, plaintiff

=== Minor v. Happersett ===
In Minor v. Happersett, 88 U.S. (21 Wall.) 162 (1875), the Supreme Court held that, while women are no less citizens than are men, citizenship does not confer a right to vote and state laws barring women from voting are constitutionally valid. The ruling was based on an interpretation of the Privileges or Immunities Clause of the Fourteenth Amendment. The Nineteenth Amendment, which became a part of the Constitution in 1920, effectively overruled Minor by prohibiting discrimination in voting rights based on sex. In the 1960s, the Court started to view voting as a fundamental right covered by the Equal Protection Clause of the Fourteenth Amendment. In his dissenting opinion in a 1964 Supreme Court case involving reapportionment in the Alabama state legislature, Associate Justice John Marshall Harlan II included Minor in a list of past decisions about voting and apportionment which were no longer being followed.

== Citation style ==
Under the Judiciary Act of 1789 the federal court structure at the time comprised District Courts, which had general trial jurisdiction; Circuit Courts, which had mixed trial and appellate (from the US District Courts) jurisdiction; and the United States Supreme Court, which had appellate jurisdiction over the federal District and Circuit courts—and for certain issues over state courts. The Supreme Court also had limited original jurisdiction (i.e., in which cases could be filed directly with the Supreme Court without first having been heard by a lower federal or state court). There were one or more federal District Courts and/or Circuit Courts in each state, territory, or other geographical region.

Bluebook citation style is used for case names, citations, and jurisdictions.

- "C.C.D." = United States Circuit Court for the District of . . .
  - e.g.,"C.C.D.N.J." = United States Circuit Court for the District of New Jersey
- "D." = United States District Court for the District of . . .
  - e.g.,"D. Mass." = United States District Court for the District of Massachusetts
- "E." = Eastern; "M." = Middle; "N." = Northern; "S." = Southern; "W." = Western
  - e.g.,"C.C.S.D.N.Y." = United States Circuit Court for the Southern District of New York
  - e.g.,"M.D. Ala." = United States District Court for the Middle District of Alabama
- "Ct. Cl." = United States Court of Claims
- The abbreviation of a state's name alone indicates the highest appellate court in that state's judiciary at the time.
  - e.g.,"Pa." = Supreme Court of Pennsylvania
  - e.g.,"Me." = Supreme Judicial Court of Maine

== List of cases in 88 U.S. (21 Wall.) ==
| Case Name | Page and year | Opinion of the Court | Concurring opinion(s) | Dissenting opinion(s) | Lower Court | Disposition |
|---|---|---|---|---|---|---|
| The Lady Pike | 1 (1874) | Clifford | none | none | C.C.E.D. Wis. | reversed |
| Jerome v. McCarter | 17 (1874) | Waite | none | none | C.C.E.D. Mich. | no bond increase |
| Doane v. Glenn | 33 (1874) | Swayne | none | none | Sup. Ct. Terr. Colo. | reversed |
| Gardner v. Brown | 36 (1875) | Waite | none | none | C.C.M.D. Tenn. | affirmed |
| Vannevar v. Bryant | 41 (1874) | Waite | none | none | Mass. Super. Ct. | affirmed |
| Schulenberg v. Harriman | 44 (1875) | Field | none | none | C.C.D. Minn. | affirmed |
| Clinkenbeard v. United States | 65 (1874) | Bradley | none | Clifford | C.C.S.D. Ohio | reversed |
| Maxwell v. Stewart | 71 (1875) | Waite | none | none | Sup. Ct. Terr. N.M. | affirmed |
| Hamilton v. Dillin | 73 (1875) | Bradley | none | none | C.C.M.D. Tenn. | affirmed |
| Douglass v. Douglass | 98 (1874) | Swayne | none | none | Sup. Ct. D.C. | reversed |
| C. and J. Cooper and Company v. Coates and Brothers Company | 105 (1874) | Hunt | none | none | C.C.N.D. Ill. | affirmed |
| Smith v. Nichols | 112 (1875) | Swayne | none | none | C.C.D. Mass. | affirmed |
| City of Sacramento v. Fowle | 119 (1875) | Davis | none | none | C.C.D. Cal. | affirmed |
| Watson v. Bondurant | 123 (1874) | Bradley | none | none | C.C.D. La. | reversed |
| Dupasseur v. Rochereau | 130 (1875) | Bradley | none | none | La. | affirmed |
| Vermilye and Company v. Adams Express Company | 138 (1875) | Miller | none | none | C.C.S.D.N.Y. | affirmed |
| French v. Edwards | 147 (1875) | Swayne | none | none | C.C.D. Cal. | reversed |
| American Life Insurance Company v. Mahone | 152 (1875) | Strong | none | none | C.C.S.D. Miss. | reversed |
| Springfield Fire and Marine Insurance Company v. Sea | 158 (1874) | Waite | none | none | C.C.N.D. Ill. | affirmed |
| Minor v. Happersett | 162 (1875) | Waite | none | none | Mo. | affirmed |
| Marsh v. Whitmore | 178 (1874) | Field | none | none | C.C.D. Me. | affirmed |
| Adams v. Adams | 185 (1874) | Hunt | none | none | Sup. Ct. D.C. | affirmed |
| Garrison v. City of New York | 196 (1875) | Field | none | none | C.C.S.D.N.Y. | affirmed |
| Littlefield v. Perry | 205 (1875) | Waite | none | none | C.C.N.D.N.Y. | reversed |
| The Mohler | 230 (1874) | Davis | none | none | C.C.E.D. Wis. | affirmed |
| Ex parte Sawyer | 235 (1875) | Waite | none | none | C.C.D.N.Y. | mandamus denied |
| Tilden v. Blair | 241 (1875) | Strong | none | none | C.C.S.D.N.Y. | affirmed |
| Ochiltree v. Iowa Railroad Company | 249 (1875) | Davis | none | none | Mo. | affirmed |
| Florida Railroad Company v. Smith | 255 (1874) | Field | none | none | C.C.N.D. Fla. | reversed |
| Southern Express Company v. Caldwell | 264 (1875) | Strong | none | none | C.C.W.D. Tenn. | reversed |
| Butler v. United States | 272 (1875) | Waite | none | none | C.C.E.D. Tenn. | affirmed |
| Yonley v. Lavender | 276 (1875) | Davis | none | none | Ark. | affirmed |
| Bailey v. Clark | 284 (1875) | Field | none | none | C.C.S.D.N.Y. | affirmed |
| Terrell v. Allison | 289 (1875) | Field | none | none | C.C.S.D. Miss. | reversed |
| Decatur Bank v. St. Louis Bank | 294 (1875) | Davis | none | none | C.C.S.D. Ill. | affirmed |
| Jennisons v. Leonard | 302 (1875) | Hunt | none | none | C.C.W.D. Mich. | affirmed |
| Iowa Railroad Land Company v. Courtright | 310 (1875) | Field | none | none | Iowa | affirmed |
| Chambers County v. Clews | 317 (1874) | Hunt | none | none | M.D. Ala. | affirmed |
| Clarion Bank v. Jones's Assignee | 325 (1875) | Clifford | none | none | C.C.W.D. Pa. | affirmed |
| Bailey v. Glover | 342 (1875) | Miller | none | none | C.C.S.D. Ala. | reversed |
| Mitchell v. United States | 350 (1875) | Swayne | none | none | Ct. Cl. | affirmed |
| Hotchkiss v. National Banks | 354 (1875) | Field | none | none | C.C.S.D.N.Y. | affirmed |
| Clark's Assignee v. Iselin | 360 (1875) | Strong | none | none | C.C.S.D.N.Y. | reversed |
| Watson v. Taylor | 378 (1875) | Strong | none | Hunt | C.C.W.D. Pa. | certification |
| Brown v. Brackett | 387 (1875) | Field | none | none | Cal. | affirmed |
| Atlee v. Union Packet boat Company | 389 (1875) | Miller | none | none | C.C.D. Iowa | reversed |
| Michaels v. Post | 398 (1874) | Clifford | none | none | C.C.N.D.N.Y. | affirmed |
| Dillon v. Barnard | 430 (1875) | Field | none | none | C.C.D. Mass. | affirmed |
| Trist v. Child | 441 (1875) | Swayne | none | none | Sup. Ct. D.C. | reversed |
| Hill v. Mendenhall | 453 (1875) | Waite | none | none | C.C.E.D.N.C. | reversed |
| Baltimore and Ohio Railroad Company v. Maryland | 456 (1875) | Bradley | none | Miller | Md. | affirmed |
| Fox v. Gardner | 475 (1875) | Hunt | none | none | C.C.W.D. Wis. | affirmed |
| Grosholz v. Newman | 481 (1874) | Waite | none | none | C.C.W.D. Tex. | affirmed |
| Texas v. Chiles | 488 (1875) | Swayne | none | none | original | subpoena granted |
| Erie Railroad Company v. Pennsylvania | 492 (1875) | Hunt | none | none | Pa. | affirmed |
| Little v. Alexander | 500 (1875) | Miller | none | none | C.C.W.D.N.C. | reversed |
| In re Broderick's Will | 503 (1875) | Bradley | none | Clifford | C.C.D. Cal. | affirmed |
| Langdeau v. Hanes | 521 (1875) | Field | none | none | C.C.S.D. Ill. | affirmed |
| Edwards v. Elliott | 532 (1874) | Clifford | none | none | N.J. Sup. Ct. | affirmed |
| The Lottawanna | 558 (1875) | Bradley | none | Clifford | C.C.D. La. | reversed |
| National Bank v. Colby | 609 (1875) | Field | none | none | Ala. | reversed |
| Jackson v. Ludeling | 616 (1874) | Strong | none | none | C.C.D. La. | reversed |
| Moore v. Mississippi | 636 (1875) | Waite | none | none | Miss. | dismissed |
| Wood v. Bailey's Assignee | 640 (1875) | Miller | none | none | S.D. Ala. | affirmed |
| Doe v. Childress | 642 (1875) | Hunt | none | none | C.C.M.D. Tenn. | affirmed |
| Vigo's Case | 648 (1875) | Waite | none | none | Ct. Cl. | mandamus granted |
| United States v. Boecker | 652 (1874) | Swayne | none | Bradley | C.C.D. Md. | affirmed |
| Morton v. Nebraska | 660 (1875) | Davis | none | none | Neb. | affirmed |
