= Anna L. Clapp =

- Born: August 15, 1814; Cambridge, New York, US
- Died: December 3, 1889 (age 75); Lee Center, Illinois, US
- Known for: Activist during the American Civil War

Anna L. Clapp (1814–1889) was the only president of the St. Louis Ladies' Union Aid Society and helped supply for those wounded during the American Civil War. She advocated for women to step outside of their homes and join the efforts to help during the war. She made medical supplies available for injured soldiers and provided shelter for refugees of all color as well. Even when the war was over, she continued to make a difference by creating homes for women and orphans. She was president of the Western Female Guardian Home and the director of the St. Louis Protestant Orphan Asylum.

== Early life ==
Anna L. Clapp was born on August 15, 1814. Anna's maiden name was Wendell. She was born in Cambridge, New York and is of Dutch descent. For three years, she was a teacher in Newburgh, New York. Her desire to do good started before the American Civil War. She served as the treasurer for the Industrial School Association. The Industrial School Association was created in 1854 to provide food, shelter, and education to orphan children. At the age of twenty four, she married Alfred Clapp who was an enterprising merchant. They resided in Brooklyn, New York up until the American Civil War began. Mrs. Clapp and her husband emigrated to St. Louis, Missouri. The reason for the couples move is unknown, but they found the right place to put Anna's benevolent nature into action. Every public building was overwhelmingly taken over by wounded soldiers and the St.Louis area was in desperate need for help. Shortly after arriving in St. Louis, Anna discovered the St. Louis Ladies' Union Aid Society and her efforts to help those in need during the American Civil War began.

== St. Louis Ladies' Union Aid Society ==
Anna started her work by joining the local Ladies' Union Aid Society. The St. Louis Ladies' Union Aid Society was formed in 1861 to provide funds, supplies, and volunteers for the wounded and sick soldiers during the American Civil War. The organization was the largest and most active female aid group in St. Louis during this time. The society worked closely with the Western Sanitary Commission to help Union soldiers. The St. Louis Ladies' Union Aid Society, an all-female organization, assigned Mrs. Clapp as president in the fall of 1861. She remained the only president throughout the society's existence in St. Louis. As president she was in charge of ensuring that hospital garments, medical supplies, grief counselling, and family support were available for the needy during this time. The society did not affiliate with any religious connections, but all members were of Christian faith. Jessie Benton Freemont and Adaline Weston Couzins were among many of the women in the Ladies' Union Aid Society.

== Post-Civil War and death ==
After the American Civil War ended, Anna continued her benevolent efforts in the St. Louis area. She was the president of the Western Female Guardian Home and the St. Louis Protestant Orphan Asylum. The St. Louis Protestant Orphan Asylum was established in 1832 due to the cholera epidemic. Many children were left without family to care for them during the epidemic. The orphan asylum has transformed into what is now known as Great Circle and still provides services to those struggling. Anna L. Clapp died on December 3, 1889, in Lee Center, Illinois.
