= Simon Pollak =

Czech-American physician (1814–1903)

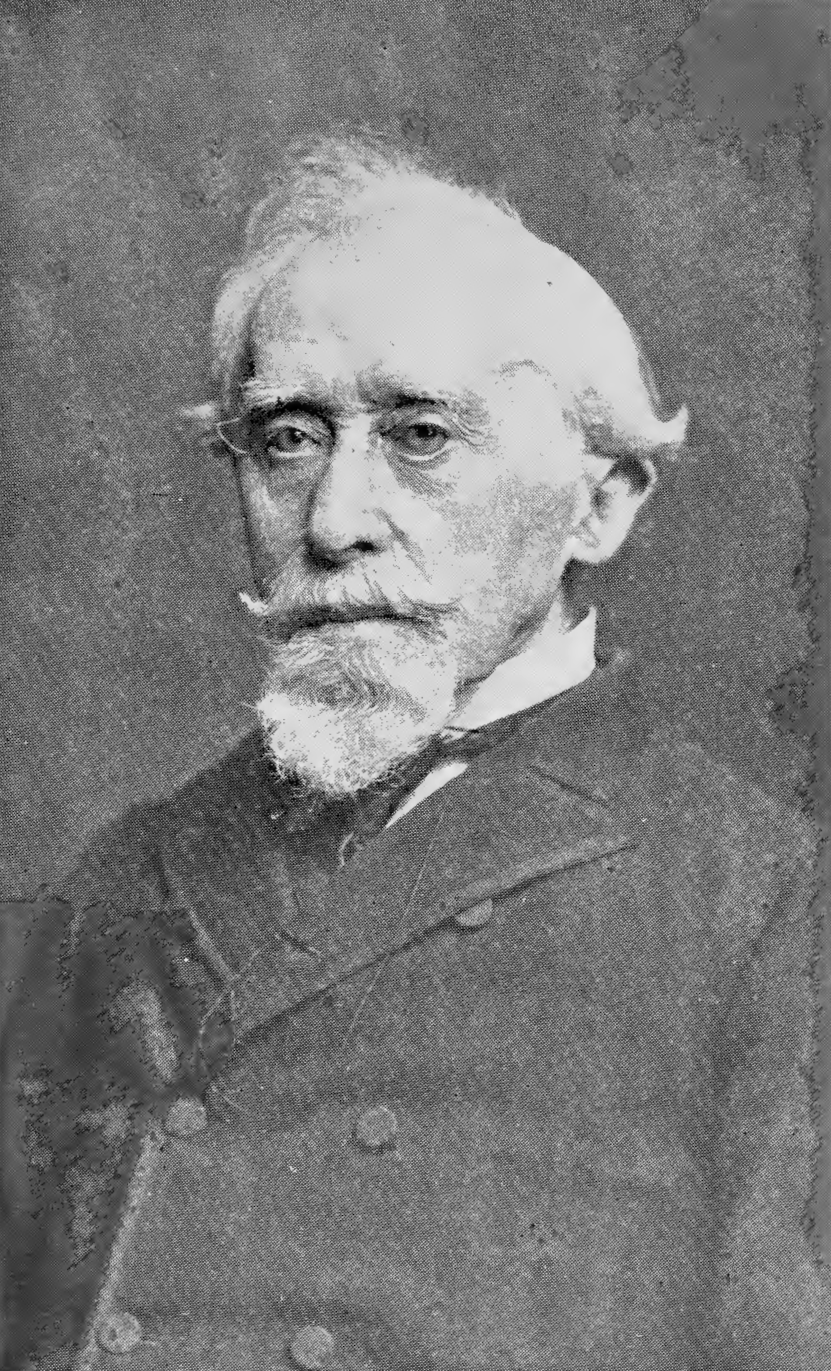
- Born: April 14, 1814; Prague
- Died: October 31, 1903 (aged 89); St. Louis, Missouri, US
- Medical career
- Profession: Physician
- Sub-specialties: Ophthalmology, otology

Simon Pollak (April 14, 1814 – October 31, 1903) was a St. Louis doctor who helped to found the Missouri Institute for the Education of the Blind in 1850 and who was involved in the development of the Western Sanitary Commission during the American Civil War. The Missouri Institute for the Education of the Blind was the first institute to adopt the Braille System in the United States. The Western Sanitary Commission provided military camps with trained nurses, hospitals, and sanitary conditions.

== Biography ==
Pollak was born in Prague and his family moved to Vienna when he was five. His father was a successful merchant. Pollak graduated from medical school in Vienna in 1835. He received postgraduate training in several cities in Europe. He gained unique experience when the Austrian government asked him to be part of a delegation to Russia to learn more about cholera.

After moving to the United States, Pollak practiced medicine in Nashville, Tennessee, for several years. In the mid-1840s, Pollak became friends with U.S. senator Alexander Barrow and military colonel Zachary Taylor, the future U.S. president. Taylor and Barrow asked Pollak to accompany them on a trip to Louisiana, where they introduced him to influential people in several cities. Based on these contacts, he decided to move to St. Louis in 1844. In St. Louis, Pollak established a successful medical practice. He was a general practitioner, but he had a special interest in eye and ear issues. He has been described as the first ophthalmologist in St. Louis. Pollak served several terms as treasurer of the St. Louis Medical Society, and he served one term as president.

In 1850, Pollak helped to start the Missouri School for the Blind. Until 1847, the state of Missouri issued no funds for the education of the blind, and in that year they only provided enough funding to educate fifteen students for a two-year period. The state legislature had usually taken the stance that it was wasteful to educate the blind. By 1851, a private citizen, Eli William Whelan, connected with Pollak and they started a foundation to plan for the Missouri School for the Blind. The organization applied for state funding, and the legislature agreed to give the school $3,000 per year for five years if they raised the initial $10,000.

The Missouri School for the Blind opened in late 1851, and the founders allowed it to fall under the control of the Missouri legislature in 1855. During Pollak's time with the school, he introduced Braille to his students. The system had not been embraced in the United States before that time, but Pollak had learned about it when he trained in Europe. Most schools preferred other systems for the blind, because Braille was not understood by those who could see. Braille was not adopted widely in the U.S. until the early 1890s.

In 1856, Pollak was one of fifteen founders of the Academy of Science, St. Louis. He opened the first eye and ear clinic in St. Louis in 1860; it was based at Mullanphy Hospital. During the Civil War, he served on the United States Sanitary Commission. He worked at the eye and ear clinic until his death at the age of 89. Pollak had gotten married in 1873 to the former Sallie Perry, and he was survived by his wife and two sons.

Pollak was described after his death as the "oldest and most illustrious member" of the St. Louis Medical Society.
