= Missouri School for the Blind =

American school for the bling in St. Louis

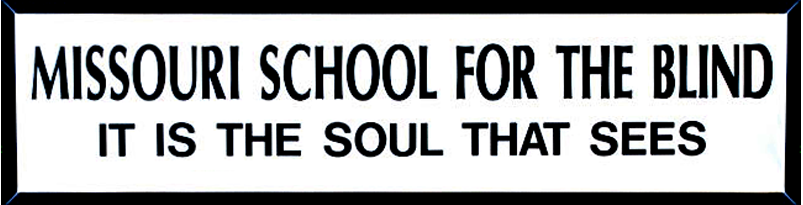

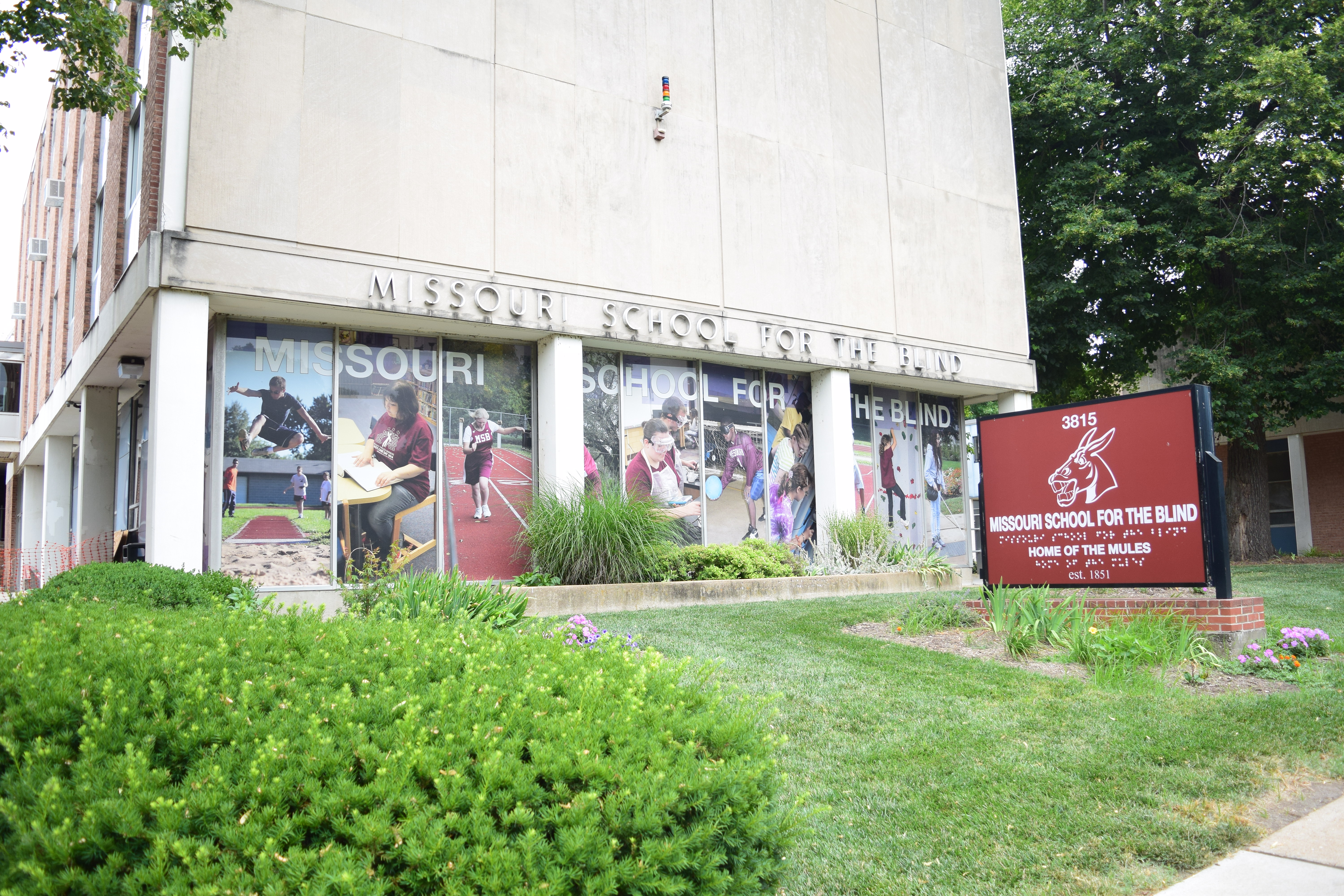
- Missouri School for the Blind sign

Location
- 3815 Magnolia Avenue; St. Louis, Missouri 63110; United States; 38°36′30″N 90°14′42″W

Information
- Type: Public high school
- Established: 1851; 175 years ago
- Superintendent: Geoffrey Barney
- Grades: K–12
- Enrollment: 67
- Website: msb.dese.mo.gov

The Missouri School for the Blind (MSB, Braille: ⠍⠊⠎⠎⠕⠥⠗⠊ ⠎⠉⠓⠕⠕⠇ ⠋⠕⠗ ⠞⠓⠑ ⠃⠇⠊⠝⠙) is a school for the blind and visually impaired in St. Louis, Missouri, operated by the State of Missouri. It has served the state of Missouri from the Greater St. Louis area for more than 150 years as a governmental agency of the state of Missouri. In 1860, the Missouri School became the first educational institution in the nation to adopt the braille system. It also owned, developed and operated one of the nation's earliest braille printing presses.

== History ==
The Missouri School for the Blind is a state-operated agency in St. Louis, Missouri, serving children from kindergarten through twelfth grade. The school opened under the formal name "Missouri Institution for the Education of the Blind" in 1851. It was organized as a private charitable enterprise by Eli William Whelan, a blind teacher who had previously been the superintendent of the Tennessee Institution for the Blind. The Missouri General Assembly placed the school under state control in 1855, and it was given its present name by legislative decree in 1879.

Among the alumni of the Missouri School are the blind musicians Nat Brown, John William Boone (1864–1927) and Louis Hardin, aka "Moondog" (1916–1999).

=== Modern era ===
As of 2011, the school has an enrollment of sixty-seven students served by nineteen teachers, forming a student/teacher ratio of 3.5. Modern classrooms are augmented with technologically advanced tools including BrailleNotes and other computers with refreshable Braille displays and text-to-speech functions. The physical location of the school has changed numerous times since it was founded, but it has never closed. It remains in the city of St. Louis, fully operated by the Missouri Department of Elementary and Secondary Education (DESE).

== Campus ==
The school maintains boarding facilities.

== Adoption of braille ==
The braille system of writing had been slow to develop in the United States, but was introduced at the Missouri School in the late 1850s by a member of its board of directors, Dr. Simon Pollak. He had witnessed the promise of the braille system while he was in Europe, but the Missouri School's director, Dr. John T. Sibley, opposed the system because it could not be readily appreciated by sighted teachers. Eventually, however, the students themselves took up Pollak's cause and found an enthusiastic spokesman in the school's music department chairman, Henry Robyn. With him, the students finally overcame the administration's opposition and braille was officially adopted for use at the school in 1860.

Two years later, the school was able to report that "great advantage has been derived from the use of the system of point writing known as Braille." It further noted that "in music its excellency is especially manifest." In a meeting of the Board of Trustees on 30 June 1863, singular praise was bestowed upon the music teacher Robyn: "This Institution is the pioneer of the Braille system in this country, and Mr. Robyn certainly deserves the honorable title of benefactor of the blind."

The Missouri School was the first educational institution in the United States to recognize braille as the primary system for blind persons' instruction. The braille system had been popularized throughout Europe since soon after Louis Braille's death in 1852, but did not find widespread approval in America until much later. Despite the Missouri School's endorsement, the rest of the country's schools would take until 1916 before officially adopting braille.

=== Early braille printing press ===
The teacher Henry Robyn supplied the school with his own custom-made braille printing press. The press functioned by means of metal slugs bearing braille dots in relief: the slugs were hand-placed in a flat frame, over which soft rollers were run to emboss the dots onto paper. The press first went to work in 1865 with Robyn personally handling its operation.

Although more than one claim has been made regarding the title of "first braille printing press in the United States," some authorities have clearly awarded that title to the Missouri School. Harvard professor Gabriel Farrell states definitively, "The first real printing press for the blind in the United States was invented and operated by Henry Robyn, head of the music department at the Missouri School for the Blind, in 1865."

== See also ==
- Blindness and education

== Bibliography ==
- Farrell, Gabriel (1956). The Story of Blindness. Cambridge: Harvard University Press. ISBN 9780674839403. OCLC 263655.
- Montesi, Albert; Deposki, Richard (2004). St. Louis Garden District. Arcadia Publishing. ISBN 978-0-7385-3259-2.
