= Victoria Clay Haley =

American suffragist, clubwoman, bank executive, and fundraiser

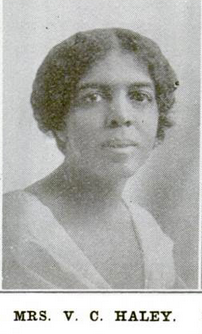
Victoria Clay Haley, in a 1917 publication.

Victoria Clay Haley (January 1, 1877 – after 1940), later Victoria Clay Roland, was an American suffragist, clubwoman, bank executive, and fundraiser based in St. Louis, Missouri and later in Chicago.

== Early life ==
Victoria Clay was born in Macon, Mississippi and raised in St. Louis, the daughter of Samuel Clay and Charlotte Williams Clay. She graduated from Sumner High School in St. Louis in 1895, and attended a business college in Chicago.

== Career ==
Victoria Clay taught school from 1900 until her marriage in 1904. She was the first vice-president of the Young Women's Christian Association in St. Louis, and served two terms on the board of commissioners of the State Industrial School for Incorrigible Negro Girls. She was a contributing editor to a weekly newspaper, St. Louis Afro-American, and wrote short stories. She was a member of the National Negro Press Association.

Victoria Clay Haley was president of the Federated Colored Women's Clubs of St. Louis in 1913, when the city hosted a large regional suffrage conference. Haley attended, although the hotel venue of the conference did not usually serve black guests. The hotel management and some fellow attendees requested that she leave, but she held her seat, and her attendance was defended by the conference leadership. She returned to the same conference in Des Moines, Iowa the following year.

Haley was active in the National Association of Colored Women's Clubs. She was on the executive committee of the Frederick Douglass Home, a historic preservation project of the NACW. In 1914, her motion carried for the NACW to endorse the work of her friend, Madame C. J. Walker. During World War I, she chaired the St. Louis chapter of the Colored Women's Unit of the Council of National Defense, and chaired the Colored Women's War Savings Commission of Missouri.

Haley was active in Republican party work in St. Louis. She was an alternate in the Missouri delegation to the 1920 Republican National Convention. In 1921, she was the director of the Western district for the Republican National Committee's outreach to black women voters. Victoria Clay Haley was also active in church work, and was Grand Matron of the Order of the Eastern Star in Missouri. She was also "chief of the St. Louis division of the Grand Fountain of the United Order of True Reformers" in 1912.

In the 1920s, she was on the executive board of the Douglass National Bank of Chicago. In 1926 she was named chair of the National Headquarters Fund of the NACW, to raise money for a national headquarters.

== Personal life ==
Victoria Clay married James L. Haley in 1904. They divorced in 1921. She moved to Chicago soon after and was known as Victoria Clay Roland there.
