= Francis Minor =

American lawyer and suffragist (1820–1892)

Francis Minor (August 15, 1820 – February 19, 1892), husband of suffragist Virginia Minor, was a lawyer and a women's rights advocate. Turning Point Suffragist Memorial lists Francis along with six others (including Frederick Douglass) as "Suffragist Men" and "the Importance of Allies."

== Early life and education ==
Minor was born in Orange County, Virginia on August 20, 1820. He graduated from Princeton University and the University of Virginia before he and his wife (a distant cousin), moved to St. Louis in 1845 from Virginia.

They had only one child, a son named Francis Gilmer Minor, who was born in 1852 and died in 1866 as a result of a "shooting accident."

== Women's suffrage activist ==
When the Minors arrived in St. Louis, Francis purchased a home valued at $6,000. "The law said that only the man could be the owner of property, so in the spring of 1846, Francis put all their property in a trust in his wife's name, thus circumventing the law and allowing her to legally own the property and thus have the power to buy and sell said property."

In 1869 a national woman suffrage convention was held in St. Louis. In preparation, Francis drafted a pamphlet and set of resolutions asserting national women's suffrage was already legal based on the verbiage of section one of the Fourteenth Amendment which makes no reference to sex or gender, only "citizens" and "persons."

A few years later, in 1872, seeking judicial judgment of Francis's interpretation of the Fourteenth Amendment, Virginia went to the Old Courthouse in St. Louis (the same courthouse where the Dred Scott case was argued in 1846 and 1850) to register to vote. When the registrar, Reese Happersett, refused to allow her to do so, Francis filed a lawsuit. "Since women were not allowed to file suit on their own behalf, Virginia was named as co-plaintiff. The suit demanded that Reese Happersett be ordered to register Virginia Minor to vote and pay damages in the sum of $10,000."

After losing in circuit court, Francis appealed to the Supreme Court of Missouri, where he had served as a clerk until stepping down on May 1, 1873, so as not to give the appearance of a conflict of interest. After also losing there, Francis appealed his wife's case to the Supreme Court of the United States, argued the case, and lost in a unanimous decision, Minor v. Happersett, 88 U.S. 162 (1874).

== Death and tributes ==
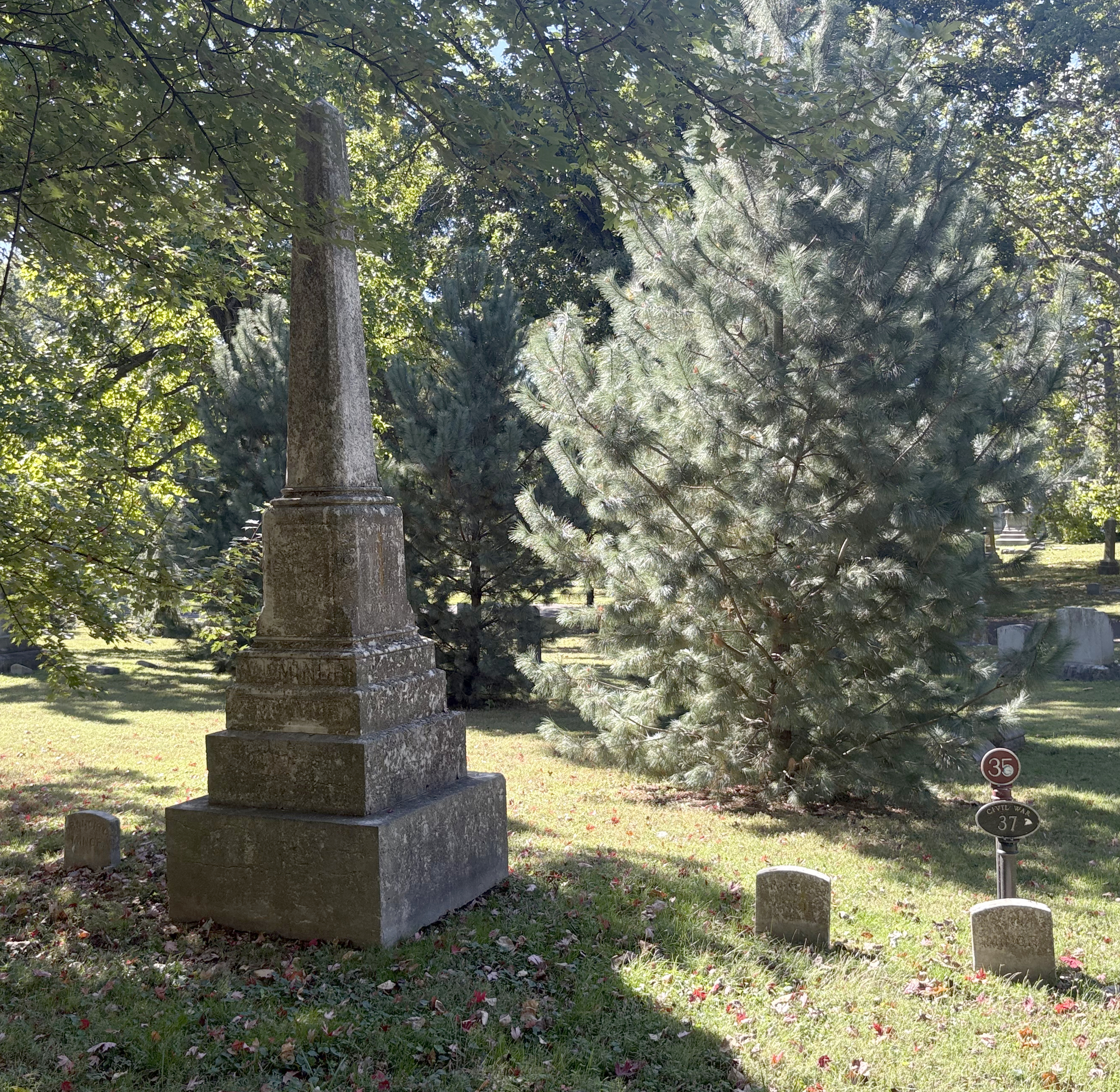
Graves of Francis and Virginia Minor at Bellefontaine Cemetery

When Francis Minor died in St. Louis at age 71, on February 19, 1892 (two years before his wife), Susan B. Anthony wrote about him, "No man has contributed to the woman suffrage movement so much valuable constitutional argument and proof as Mr. Minor."

Francis is buried at Bellefontaine Cemetery next to his wife and their only child. "Coincidentally, in a unmarked grave just across the cemetery road, less than two-hundred feet away, sits the grave of [their] adversary Reese Happersett."
