= Minor v. Happersett =

- Supreme Court of the United States

Argued February 9, 1875 Decided March 29, 1875
- Full case name: Virginia Minor v. Reese Happersett
- Citations: 88 U.S. 162 (more) 21 Wall. 162; 22 L. Ed. 627

Case history
- Prior: Appeal from the Supreme Court of Missouri; 53 Mo. 58 (1873)

Holding
- The Fourteenth Amendment does not guarantee women the right to vote.

Court membership
- Chief Justice Morrison Waite Associate Justices Nathan Clifford · Noah H. Swayne; Samuel F. Miller · David Davis; Stephen J. Field · William Strong; Joseph P. Bradley · Ward Hunt

Case opinion
- Majority: Waite, joined by unanimous

Laws applied
- U.S. Const. amend. XIV
- Superseded by
- U.S. Const. amend. XIX (in part)

Minor v. Happersett, 88 U.S. (21 Wall.) 162 (1875), is a United States Supreme Court case in which the Court held that citizenship does not confer a right to vote, and therefore state laws barring women from voting were constitutionally valid. The Supreme Court upheld state court decisions in Missouri, which had refused to register a woman as a lawful voter because that state's laws allowed only men to vote.

The Minor v. Happersett ruling was based on an interpretation of the Privileges or Immunities Clause of the Fourteenth Amendment. The Supreme Court readily accepted that Minor was a citizen of the United States, but it held that the constitutionally protected privileges of citizenship did not include the right to vote.

The opinion concluded with the statement that "...the Constitution of the United States does not confer the right of suffrage upon anyone". This was clarified in Ex parte Yarbrough, 110 U.S. 651 (1884) which stated that "the Constitution adopts as the qualification for voters of members of Congress that which prevails in the State where the voting is to be done; therefore... the right is not definitely conferred on any person or class of persons by the Constitution alone, because you have to look to the law of the State for the description of the class. But the court did not intend to say that when the class or the person is thus ascertained, his right to vote for a member of Congress was not fundamentally based upon the Constitution".

The Nineteenth Amendment, which became a part of the Constitution in 1920, superseded Minor v. Happersett with respect to women's suffrage. Minor v. Happersett continued to be cited in support of restrictive election laws of other types until the 1960s, when the Supreme Court started interpreting the Fourteenth Amendment's Equal Protection Clause to prohibit discrimination among citizenry in voting rights.

== Background ==
Virginia Minor, a leader of the women's suffrage movement in Missouri, attempted to register to vote on October 15, 1872, in St. Louis County, Missouri, but was refused on the grounds that she was a woman. With the assistance of her husband, Francis Minor (a lawyer), she brought an action in state courts against Reese Happersett, the registrar who had rejected her application to register to vote, alleging that the provisions of the Missouri state constitution which allowed only men to vote were in violation of the United States Constitution, and specifically the Fourteenth Amendment. The key to the Minors' argument was that citizenship entailed voting rights—an assertion with enough rhetoric on both sides to make it an open question.

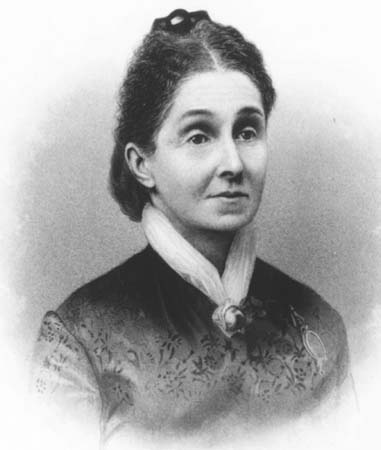
Virginia Minor, whose attempts to register as a voter gave rise to the Minor v. Happersett case

The Missouri Supreme Court ruled in favor of the registrar and against Minor. The state court observed that the "almost universal practice of all of the States ... from the adoption of the Constitution to the present time" was to restrict voting rights to men only; and, additionally, that the clear intent of the Fourteenth Amendment was to give the rights of citizenship to the former slaves, and not to force other changes in state laws. The court noted, in particular, that the second section of the Fourteenth Amendment (penalizing states which denied the right to vote to any of its citizens) referred specifically to male citizens, and concluded that "this clearly recognizes the right, and seems to anticipate the exercise of the right, on the part of the States to restrict the right of suffrage to the male inhabitants."

Minor appealed the Missouri ruling to the United States Supreme Court, presenting the same arguments before the Supreme Court as had been unsuccessfully put forth before the state court, and additionally proposing that women's suffrage was consistent with the original intent of the framers of the Constitution. The Supreme Court observed that the sole point at issue was whether the Constitution entitled women to vote despite state laws limiting this right to men only. The State of Missouri did not send counsel to defend its decision before the Supreme Court, choosing instead to justify its decision in a three-sentence demurrer.

The case was argued on February 9, 1875 and decided March 29, 1875.

== Opinion of the Court ==
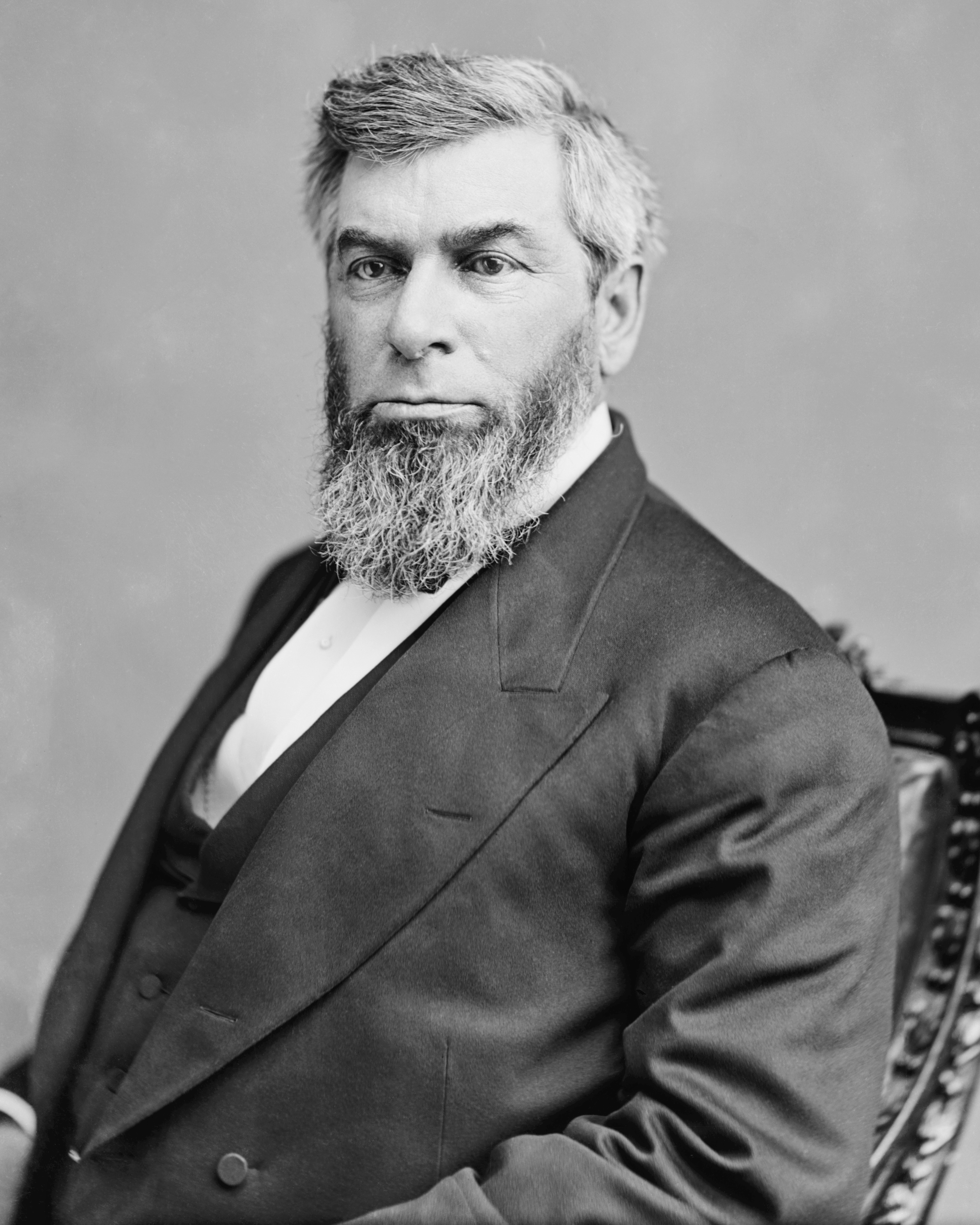
Chief Justice Morrison Waite, who wrote the Minor v. Happersett opinion for a unanimous Supreme Court

The Supreme Court unanimously upheld the Missouri voting legislation, saying that voting was not an inherent right of citizenship, that the Constitution neither granted nor forbade voting rights for women, and that allowing only male citizens to vote was not an infringement of Minor's rights under the Fourteenth Amendment.

The opinion (written by Chief Justice Morrison Waite) first asked whether Minor was a citizen of the United States, and answered that she was, citing both the Fourteenth Amendment and earlier common law. Exploring the common-law origins of citizenship, the court observed that "new citizens may be born or they may be created by naturalization" and that the Constitution "does not, in words, say who shall be natural-born citizens." Under the common law, according to the court, "it was never doubted that all children born in a country of parents who were its citizens became themselves, upon their birth, citizens also. These were natives, or natural-born citizens, as distinguished from aliens or foreigners." The court observed that some authorities "include as citizens children born within the jurisdiction without reference to the citizenship of their parents"—but since Minor was born in the United States and her parents were U.S. citizens, she was unquestionably a citizen herself, even under the narrowest possible definition, and the court thus noted that the subject did not need to be explored in any greater depth.

The court then asked whether the right to vote was one of the "privileges or immunities of citizens of the United States" at the time of the Fourteenth Amendment's adoption in 1868. Citing a variety of historical sources, it found that it was not. The court reasoned that the Constitution of the United States did not explicitly give citizens an affirmative right to vote and that, throughout the history of the nation from the adoption of the Constitution, a wide variety of persons—including women—were recognized as citizens but denied the right to vote. For example, at the time of the adoption of the Constitution, none of the original Thirteen Colonies gave all citizens the right to vote, all attaching restrictions based on factors such as sex, race, age, and ownership of land. The opinion continues that "it cannot for a moment be doubted that if it had been intended to make all citizens of the United States voters, the framers of the Constitution would not have left it to implication. So important a change in the condition of citizenship as it actually existed, if intended, would have been expressly declared."

== Subsequent history ==
The Nineteenth Amendment to the Constitution, ratified in 1920, prohibited sex-based denial or abridgment of any United States citizen's right to vote, abrogating the key holding in Minor v. Happersett. In some later voting rights cases, however, Minor was cited in opposition to the claim that the federal Constitution conferred a general right to vote, and in support of restrictive election laws involving poll taxes, literacy tests, and the role of political parties in special elections.

In the 1960s, the Supreme Court started to view voting as a fundamental right covered by the Equal Protection Clause of the Fourteenth Amendment. In his dissenting opinion in Reynolds v. Sims (1964) involving reapportionment in the Alabama state legislature, Associate Justice John Marshall Harlan II included Minor in a list of past decisions about voting and apportionment which were no longer being followed. However, the majority opinion in Reynolds v. Sims does not mention or cite Minor v. Happersett, and instead cites Ex parte Yarbrough in concluding that the federal constitution does protect the right of qualified citizens to vote in federal and state elections.

== See also ==
- Women's suffrage in the United States
- List of United States Supreme Court cases, volume 88
