= Ladies' aid societies =

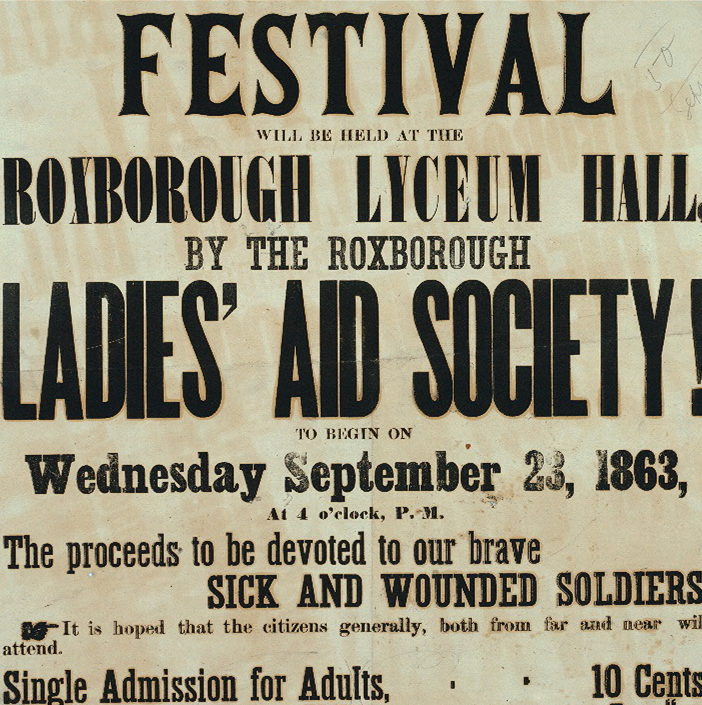
Flyer for Ladies' Aid Society festival to benefit wounded Civil War soldiers

Ladies' aid societies or soldiers' aid societies were organizations of women formed during the American Civil War that were dedicated to providing supplies to soldiers on the battlefield and caring for sick and wounded soldiers. Over the course of the war, between 7,000 and 20,000 ladies' aid societies were established. The work these women did in providing sanitary supplies and blankets to soldiers helped lessen the spread of diseases during the Civil War. In the North, their work was supported by the U.S. Sanitary Commission. At the end of the war, many ladies' aid societies in the South transformed into memorial associations. Free black women often formed their own ladies' aid societies, like the Colored Ladies Soldiers' Aid Society of St. Louis, Missouri, headed by Mary Meachum, which tended to black Union soldiers at the local hospital.

== The Sanitary Commission ==
Although war causes many casualties, for every man that died from battle during the Civil War, two men died from disease. Dysentery, diarrhea, typhoid and malaria were all diseases caused by the overcrowdedness and unsanitary conditions during the war. People began addressing the importance of having clean water, clean food, and fresh air to breathe. Women decided to take initiative. They began collecting food, clothing, medicine, or anything usable for the soldiers in need. However, the women had an issue—they were not sure how they would be able to deliver the supplies to the soldiers. They held a conference in New York for all the doctors, lawyers, and clergymen interested in helping the soldiers. The result of this event led to the formation of the Sanitary Commission. The sanitation was organized, run, and supplied by the civilians.

== Soldiers' Aid Society of Northern Ohio ==
At the Ladies’ Aid Society a group of women from Cleveland met and organized a "blanket raid" to collect blankets for the troops of soldiers. Months after the women organized the raid, they connected with other local groups to create the Soldiers' Aid Society. The organization was financed by private donations to care for the sick and wounded. They provided hospital service, food, clothing, and medical supplies. They established their distribution center at 95 Bank (W. 6th) St. From February 22 to March 10, 1864, the women from the Soldiers' Aid Society held a Sanitation Fair. The fair was organized to raise money to help soldiers during the Civil War.

== After the Civil War ==
When the war was over, soldiers who came home were still in need of medical care, so many ladies' aid societies continued to support hospitals and war veterans. As they volunteered, women picked up nursing skills and some of them continued into nursing careers after the war.
