= Western Sanitary Commission =

Private relief agency during the American Civil War

The Western Sanitary Commission was a private agency based in St. Louis that was a rival of the larger U.S. Sanitary Commission. It operated in the west during the American Civil War to help the U.S. Army deal with sick and wounded soldiers. It was led by abolitionists and focused on the needs of Freedmen.

It was founded in St. Louis August 1861 under the protection of General John C. Frémont and under the leadership of Reverend William Greenleaf Eliot (1811–1887) and James E. Yeatman (1818–1901). Its first mission was to care for the wounded from the Battle of Wilson's Creek. In its first six weeks it established four large general hospitals with over two thousand beds. It later set up convalescent facilities. A major activity was acquiring adequate stocks of medicines and medical supplies for the hospitals run by the U.S. Army. Working with Dorothea Dix it took charge of finding women to be civilian nurses and nurses' aides in Army facilities.

The Western Sanitary Commission generally handled all sanitary affairs west of the Mississippi, and operated on a budget of $50,000 a month (about one-fourth the size of the rival national organization). The money came from private fundraising in the city of St. Louis, as well as from donors in California and New England. Parrish explains it selected nurses, provided hospital supplies, set up several hospitals, and outfitted several hospital ships. It also provided clothing and places to stay for freedmen and refugees, and set up schools for black children. It continued to finance various philanthropic projects until 1886.

== See also ==
- Missouri in the American Civil War
- United States Sanitary Commission
