= List of Delaware suffragists =

This is a list of Delaware suffragists, suffrage groups and others associated with the cause of women's suffrage in Delaware.

== Groups ==
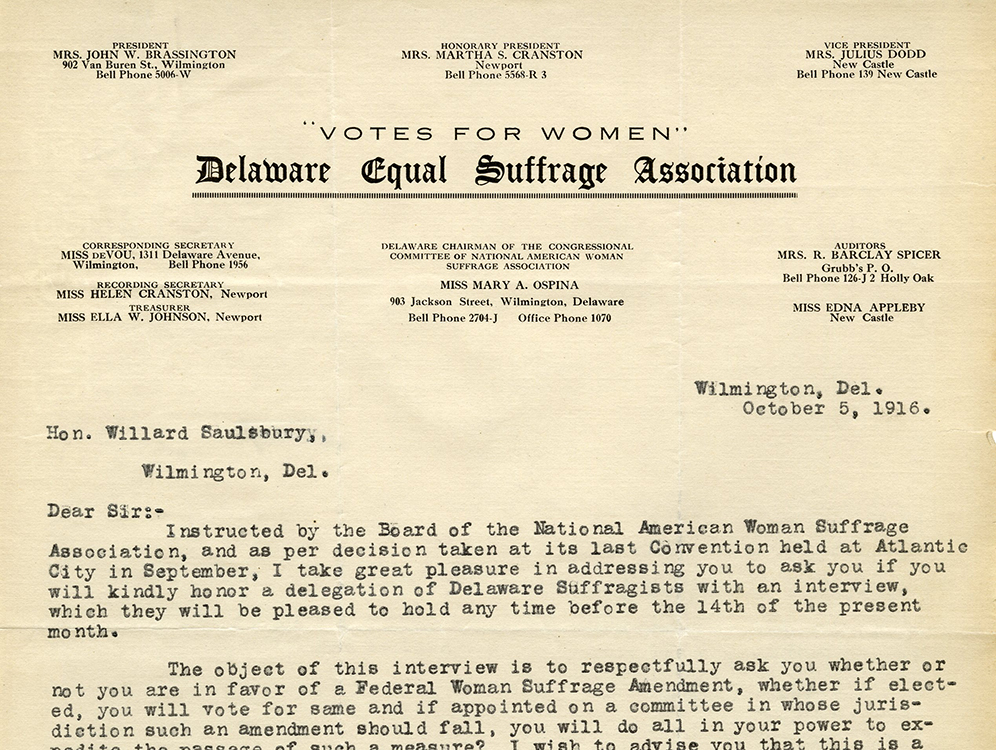
Delaware Equal Suffrage Association letterhead, 1916

- Arden Equal Suffrage Association, formed in 1912.
- Congressional Union (CU).
- Delaware Equal Suffrage Association (DESA), formed in 1895.
- Delaware Suffrage Association, formed in 1869.
- Equal Suffrage Study Club.
- New Castle Equal Suffrage Association.
- Newport Equal Suffrage Association.
- National Women's Party (NWP).
- Wilmington Equal Suffrage Club (or Association), formed in 1895.
- Wilmington Equal Suffrage Suffrage Study Club (WESSC).
- Women's Christian Temperance Union (WCTU) of Delaware.

== Suffragists ==
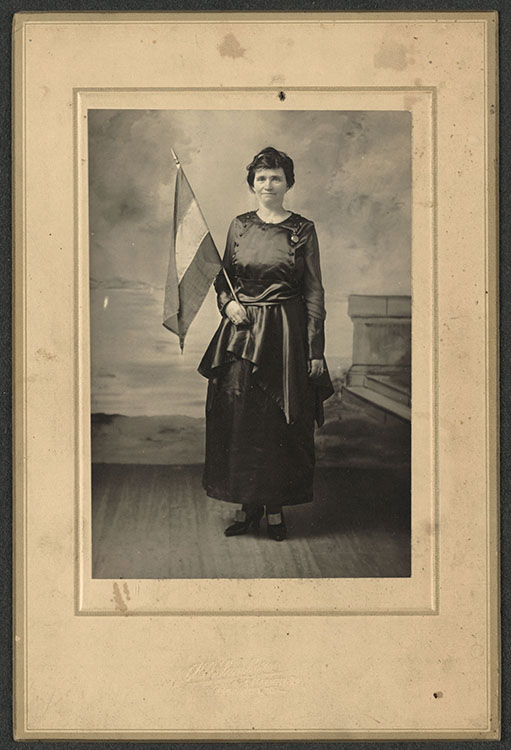
Catherine Boyle c. 1910-1920

- Helen Wormley Anderson .
- Annie Arniel (Wilmington).
- Rachel Foster Avery (Wilmington).
- Anna Cootsman Bach.
- Alice Gertrude Baldwin (Wilmington).
- Ida Perkins Ball.
- Mary Richardson Bancroft.
- Naomi Barrett (Wilmington).
- Catherine Boyle (New Castle).
- Mary Clare Brassington.
- Mary E. Brown (Wilmington).
- Eleanor Morris Burnet.
- Emma Jester Burnett.
- Mary Ann Shadd Cary (Wilmington).
- Martha Churchman Cranston.
- Mary R. De Vou (Wilmington).
- Mabel F. Donahoe.
- Bessie Spence Dorrell.
- Agnes Y. Downey (Wilmington).
- Rose Lippincott Hizar Duggin.
- Josephine Anderson du Pont.
- Mary Seward Pillips Eskridge.
- Sallie Topkis Ginns (Wilmington).
- Susie Estella Palmer Hamilton.
- Rosewell Hammond.
- Florence Hilles (New Castle).
- Robert G. Houston (Georgetown).
- Margaret W. Houston.
- Caroline Taylor Hughes.
- Ella W. Johnson.
- Etta Gray Jones (Bridgeville).
- Margaret Harrigon Kent.
- Marie T. Lockwood (Middletown).
- Emma Maria Lore (Wilmington).
- Annie J. Magee (Wilmington).
- Mary H. Askew Mather.
- Mary E. Marchand Milligan.
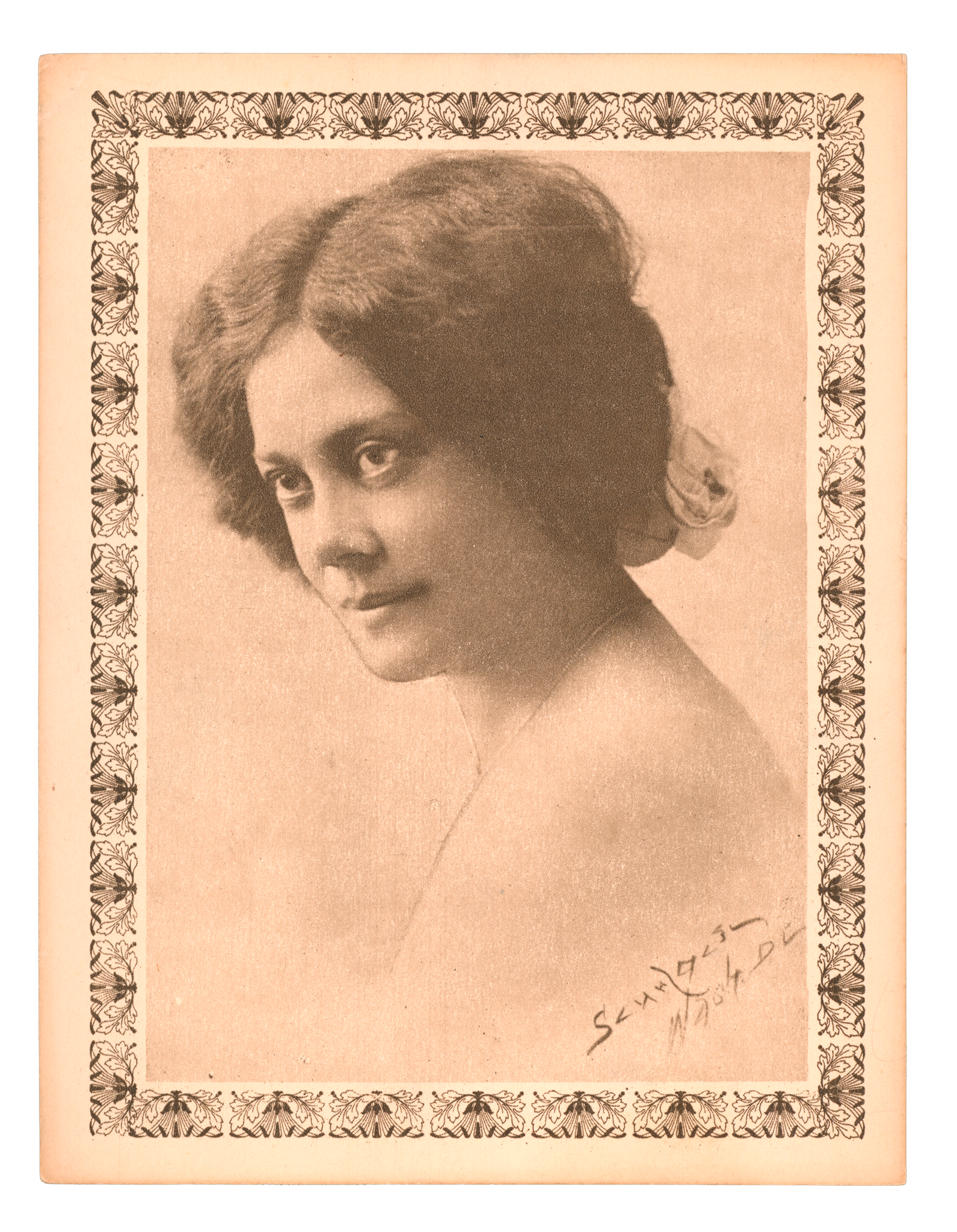
  Alice Dunbar Nelson
- Winifred Morris.
- Anna Fisher Morse.
- Alice Dunbar Nelson (Wilmington).
- Nellie B. Nicholson (Wilmington).
- Gertrude Fulton Nields.
- Mary Ospina (Wilmington).
- Jane White Pennewill.
- Mary Price Phillips.
- Adelina Piunti (New Castle).
- Mabel Lloyd Ridgely (Dover).
- Eva Halpern Robin.
- Elizabeth G. Robinson.
- Willabelle Shurter.
- Frank Stephens (Arden).
- Mary Ann Sorden Stuart (Greenwood).
- Blanche Williams Stubbs (Wilmington).
- Emma Gibson Sykes (Wilmington).
- Mabel Vernon (Wilmington).
- Elizabeth Walling.
- Emalea Pusey Warner.
- Sadie Monroe Waters (Greenwood).
- Anna Beauchamp Reynolds Wedler.
- Caroline B. Williams (Wilmington).
- Mary J. Johnson Woodlen (Wilmington).
- Emma Worrell.

=== Politicians in support of women's suffrage ===
- T. Coleman du Pont.
- John G. Townsend, Jr.

== Places ==
- Hotel DuPont (Wilmington).
- New Castle County Courthouse (New Castle).

== Suffragists who campaigned in Delaware ==
- Lida Stokes Adams.
- Lucy E. Anthony.
- Susan B. Anthony.
- Mary C. C. Bradford.
- Carrie Chapman Catt.
- Mary Ware Dennett.
- Susan S. Fessenden.
- Helen Hoy Greeley.
- Laura A. Gregg.
- Beatrice Forbes Robertson Hale.
- Florence Jaffray Harriman.
- Mary Garrett Hay.
- Elsie Hill.
- Diana Hirschler.
- Anna Maxwell Jones.
- Rosalie Jones.
- Belva Lockwood.
- Maria McMahon.
- Harriet May Mills.
- Henrietta G. Moore.
- Emmeline Pankhurst.
- Maud Wood Park.
- Jeannette Rankin.
- Anna Howard Shaw.
- Elizabeth Cady Stanton.
- Mary Church Terrell.
- Lola Trax.
- Harriet Taylor Upton.
- Narcissa Cox Vanderlip.
- Mary Heald Way.
- Mary Winsor.

== Anti-suffragists ==
Groups

- Delaware Association Opposed to Woman Suffrage (DAOWS), formed in 1914.

People

- Elizabeth du Pont Bayard.
- Amy du Pont.
- Emily Bissell (Wilmington).
- May du Pont Saulsbury.
- Mary Wilson Thompson (Greenville).

Politicians

- Henry P. Scott.

== See also ==
- List of American suffragists
- Timeline of women's suffrage in Delaware
- Women's suffrage in Delaware
- Women's suffrage in states of the United States
- Women's suffrage in the United States
