= Women's suffrage in Delaware =

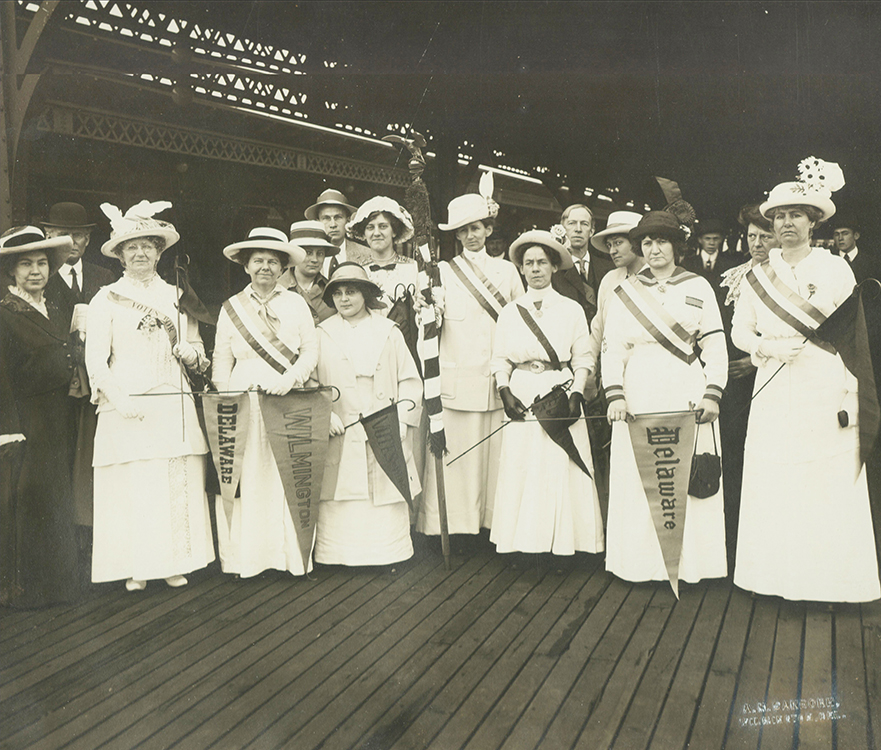
Delaware suffragists at Wilmington train station, May 1914.

Women's suffrage began in Delaware the late 1860s, with efforts from suffragist, Mary Ann Sorden Stuart, and an 1869 women's rights convention held in Wilmington, Delaware. Stuart, along with prominent national suffragists lobbied the Delaware General Assembly to amend the state constitution in favor of women's suffrage. Several suffrage groups were formed early on, but the Delaware Equal Suffrage Association (DESA) formed in 1896, would become one of the major state suffrage clubs. Suffragists held conventions, continued to lobby the government and grow their movement. In 1913, a chapter of the Congressional Union (CU), which would later be known at the National Woman's Party (NWP), was set up by Mabel Vernon in Delaware. NWP advocated more militant tactics to agitate for women's suffrage. These included picketing and setting watchfires. The Silent Sentinels protested in Washington, D.C., and were arrested for "blocking traffic." Sixteen women from Delaware, including Annie Arniel and Florence Bayard Hilles, were among those who were arrested. During World War I, both African-American and white suffragists in Delaware aided the war effort. During the ratification process for the Nineteenth Amendment, Delaware was in the position to become the final state needed to complete ratification. A huge effort went into persuading the General Assembly to support the amendment. Suffragists and anti-suffragists alike campaigned in Dover, Delaware for their cause. However, Delaware did not ratify the Nineteenth Amendment until March 6, 1923, well after it was already part of the United States Constitution.

== Early efforts ==
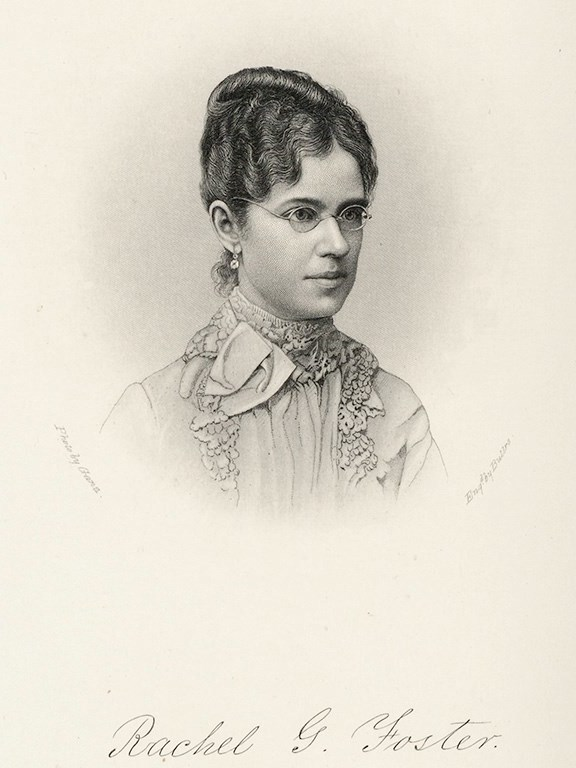
Rachel Foster Avery in 1887

The first women's rights convention in Wilmington, Delaware was held on November 12, 1869, with speakers Thomas Garrett and Lucy Stone. At the convention, the Delaware Suffrage Association was formed and affiliated with the American Woman Suffrage Association (AWSA). Mary Ann Sorden Stuart, who had been working towards women's rights issues since 1868, went on to testify in front of the United States Senate Judiciary Committee on women's suffrage in 1878. Stuart was a constant lobbyist for women's rights at the Delaware General Assembly. On January 25, 1881, Stuart, Susan B. Anthony and Elizabeth Cady Stanton addressed the General Assembly on women's suffrage.

The Delaware chapter of the Women's Christian Temperance Union (WCTU) set up a "franchise department" in 1888 to address women's suffrage. WCTU members felt that gaining suffrage for women would help them have more political power. Another women's suffrage group was the Wilmington Equal Suffrage Club, formed by Rachel Foster Avery on November 18, 1895. The next year, organizers Henrietta G. Moore and Mary Garrett Hay came to Delaware to help continue suffrage work in the state. Moore and Hay were involved in working on the state suffrage convention. The Delaware Equal Suffrage Association (DESA) was created at the convention and the group affiliated itself with the National American Woman Suffrage Association (NAWSA). DESA began its work by focusing on education about women's suffrage. They also lobbied both federal and state legislators.

To prepare for the upcoming Delaware constitutional convention in 1897, Carrie Chapman Catt met with suffrage leaders in Delaware. Mary C. C. Bradford and Laura A. Gregg came to Delaware to provide further services organizing suffragists in the state. Suffragists sent petitions around the state and Martha S. Cranston and Catt took the signatures to Dover for the convention. The constitutional convention delegates permitted the suffragists to speak on January 13, 1897. The speakers included Catt, Margaret W. Houston, Emalea Pusey Warner, and Emma Worrell. It was proposed that "male" not be applied to the description of a legal voter, but it did not pass.

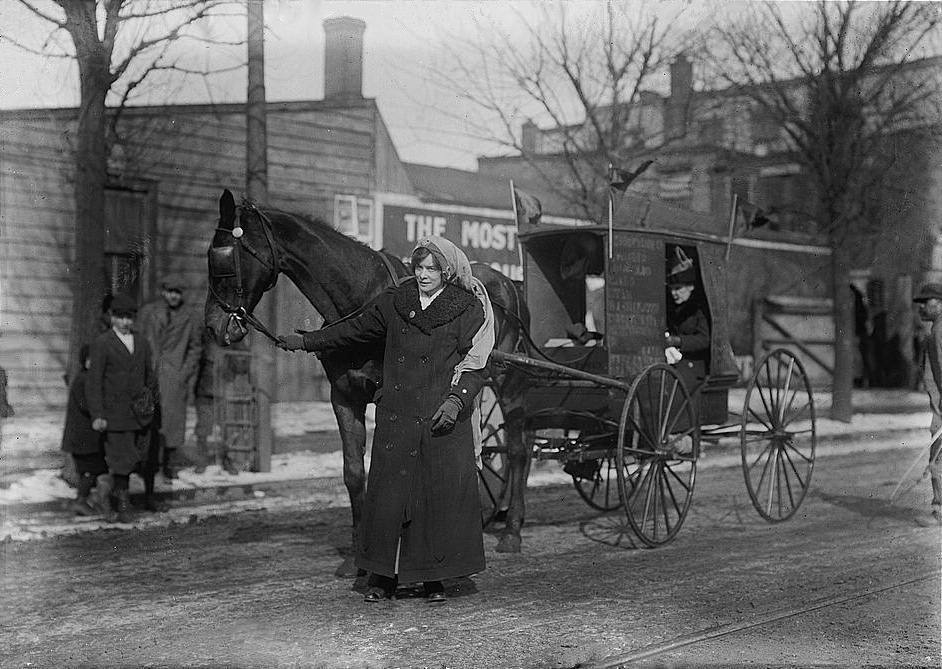
Elisabeth Freeman and Lausanne in Wilmington.

In 1900, some women who paid property taxes in the state were considered "eligible" to vote for school commissioners. That same year, anti-suffragist Emily Bissell spoke to the United States Congress against women's suffrage. In 1909, DESA helped the National American Woman Suffrage Association (NAWSA) with their federal suffrage amendment petition drive.

Suffragists in Arden, Delaware held one of the first suffrage parades in the state in 1913. The area was a "single-tax community" and overall supported women's suffrage throughout their fight in Delaware. On February 18, 1913, Rosalie Gardiner Jones and her "suffrage army" hiked through Delaware on their way to the Woman Suffrage Procession in Washington, D.C. The suffrage army was greeted and accompanied to city hall in Wilmington. They were also given a kitten as a gift, which became the suffrage army mascot and named Scouty. The suffrage army brought literature and gave speeches and other performances. The suffrage army also had their new horse, Lausanne, checked out by the local veterinarian. Lausanne was given the go-ahead to continue the march to Washington. The suffrage army was a huge draw in the city. Delaware also sent their own suffrage delegates to the National Suffrage Procession who marched on March 3, 1913. On April 7, 1913, Martha S. Cranston, president of DESA, was part of a delegation of suffragists who marched to Congress. The suffragists were urging Congress to pass a federal amendment.

== Militant Delaware suffragists ==
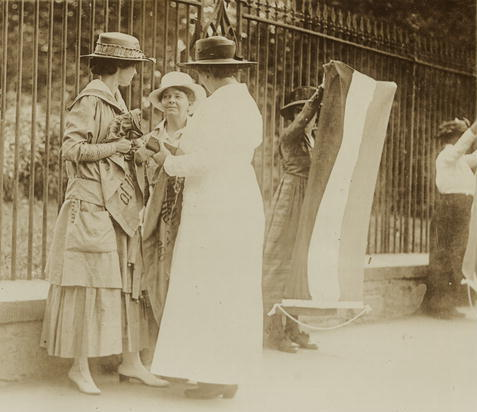
Policewoman arrests Annie Arniel for picketing the White House.

Alice Paul hired Mabel Vernon of Wilmington to work full time on the Congressional Committee of the Congressional Union (CU). Vernon opened CU headquarters in Wilmington in 1913 where CU members hoped to recruit more support for women's suffrage in the state. CU shared the headquarters with the Delaware Equal Suffrage Association (DESA). The two groups only worked together until 1915, when CU decided to form another state society. DESA had also become critical of militant suffrage tactics used by members of the CU. The News Journal wrote that the two groups chose to "agree to disagree."

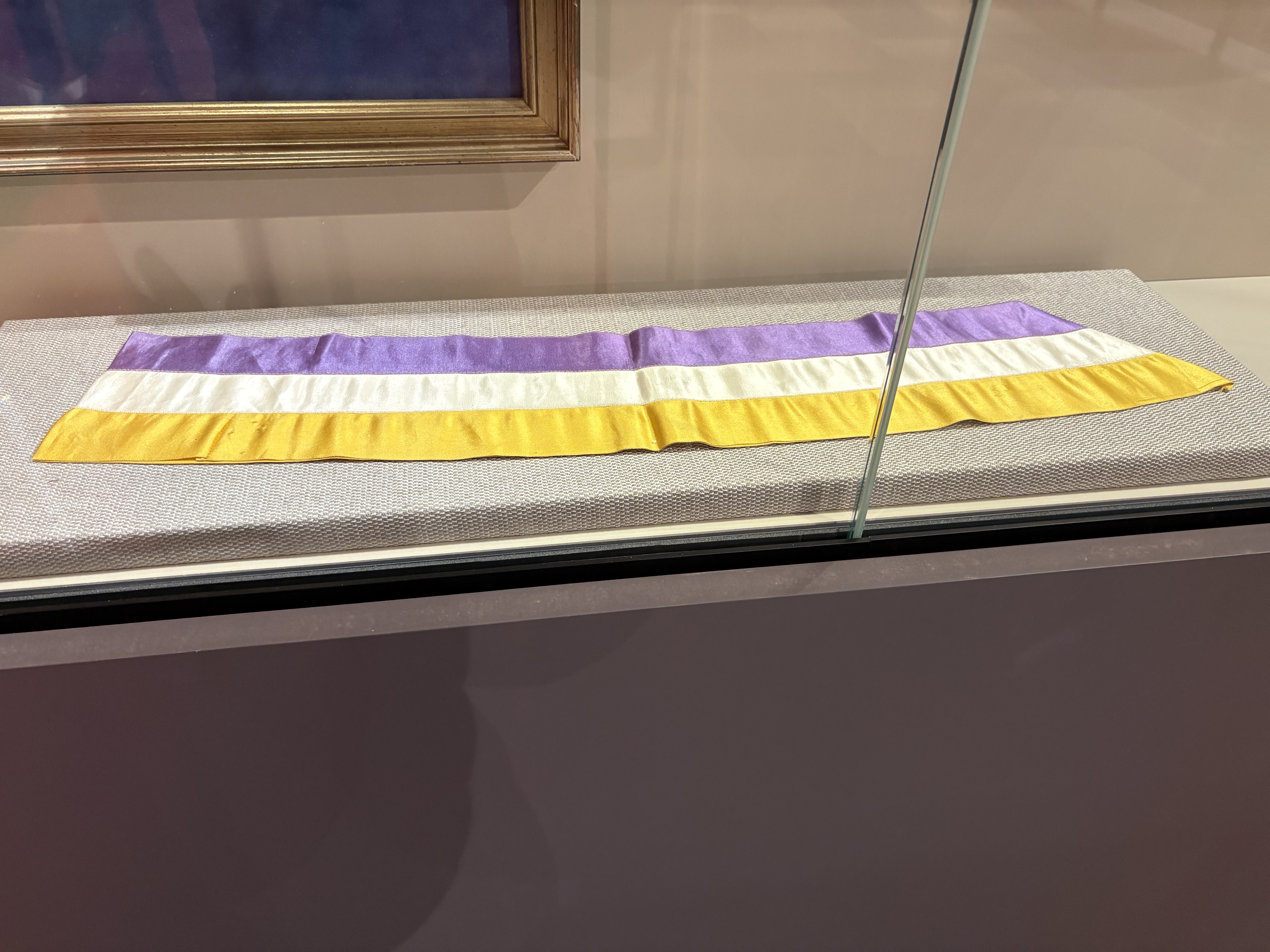
A Congressional Union sash worn by Frances Schagrin in Wilmington, Delaware’s parade for women’s suffrage on May 2, 1914.

Vernon was an effective speaker who addressed churches, labor unions, Grange meetings, and women's clubs on women's suffrage. She pioneered new tactics in Delaware to support women's suffrage, such as holding "open-air rallies and speeches." Vernon hosted Emmeline Pankhurst on her lecture tour in Wilmington in 1913. Vernon also spoke at the Delaware State Fair where she won over Florence Bayard Hilles to the cause. Hilles went on to plan the first large suffrage parade in Delaware, which took place in Wilmington on May 2, 1914. The parade, which consisted of around 400 participants, ended at the New Castle County Courthouse where suffragists held a rally. African-American suffragists also marched in the parade. In 1915, Vernon and Edna Latimer toured Delaware in a car donated by Hilles and dubbed the "Votes for Women Flyer."

Vernon was involved with more militant tactics to advance to cause of women's suffrage. Vernon interrupted a speech by President Woodrow Wilson, shouting, "Mr. President, if you sincerely desire to forward the interests of all the people, why do you oppose the national enfranchisement of women?" She was also part of the Silent Sentinels who began to picket the White House on January 10, 1917. Suffragists began to be arrested for their picketing on July 14. The 16 suffragists were charged with "blocking traffic" and were to choose between paying a large fine or spending 60 days in jail. Hilles, who was also arrested for this charge, called it "a ridiculous frame-up." She defended herself in court and tried to appeal to the patriotism of the judge. All of the women who were arrested for picketing refused to pay their fines. They were sent to Occoquan Workhouse for three days of "harsh and humiliating conditions" before they were pardoned. Sixteen suffragists from Delaware during the entirety of the protest were sentenced to Occoquan. Annie Arniel from Delaware went to jail the most times of any other American suffragist: eight times. Arniel also served a total of 103 days in jail all together.

During World War I, less militant suffragists worried that protest tactics would hurt the cause. In 1918, munitions workers Hilles and Catherine Boyle tried to meet with President Wilson to urge him to support women's suffrage. As munitions workers, Hilles and Boyle wanted to stress that they deserved the right to vote, since they contributed to WWI, too. In early 1919, Arniel, Boyle, Mary E. Brown, Hilles and Adelina Piunti started setting watchfires with women from the National Women's Party (NWP).

== Ratification efforts ==
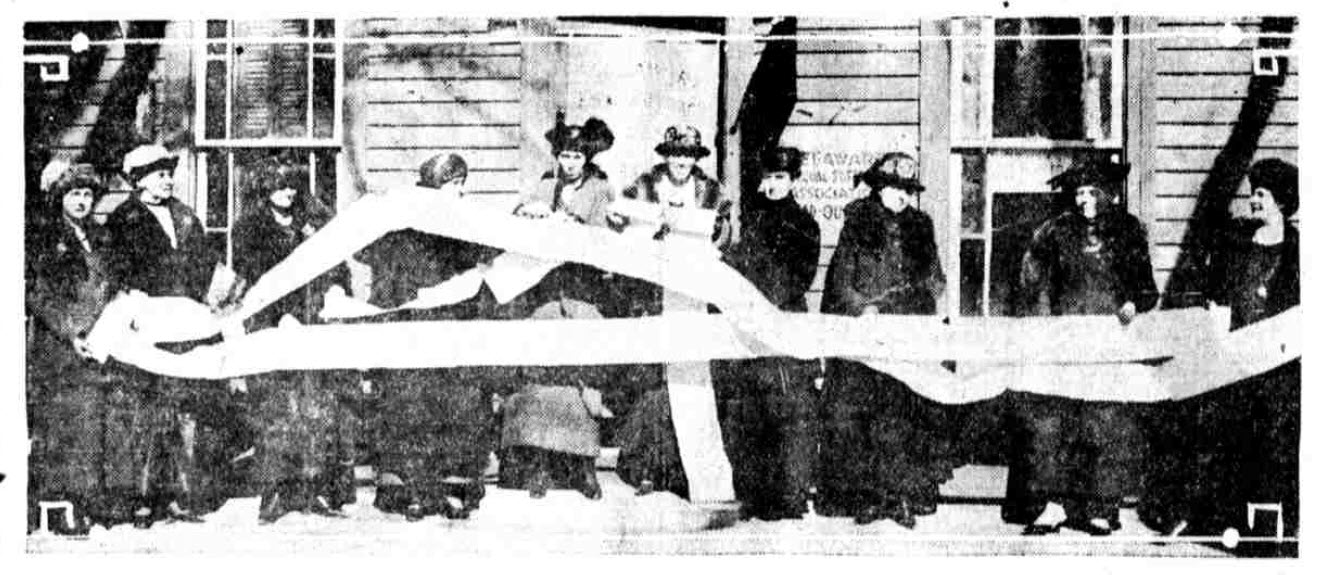
Suffragists in Dover display the 26,000 signatures for women's suffrage, March 22, 1920

In May 1918, a petition drive was kicked off in Wilmington by women who attended a "subscription luncheon" at Hotel DuPont. Carrie Chapman Catt, Maud Wood Park, and Narcissa Cox Vanderlip were featured speakers. The petitions to the United States Congress to support a federal suffrage amendment had 11,118 names that were secured by 175 volunteers in the state.

In January 1919, NAWSA organizer, Maria McMahon, came to set up suffrage headquarters in Dover, Delaware. McMahon also organized other Delaware towns. Suffragists urged their representatives in the United States Congress to pass the federal suffrage amendment. Around 600 telegrams were sent to the U.S. senators from Delaware from suffragists in the state. As women in the state started to see evidence that the federal amendment would pass the U.S. Congress, suffragists set up a committee to organize campaigning efforts. McMahon returned to help organize and T. Coleman du Pont lent his automobile to the suffragists to help them campaign. Suffragists suggested in their campaigns that politicians who gave them the right to vote would be rewarded with a faithful base of voters. Women pressed for a special session to ratify the Nineteenth Amendment. On March 22, 1920, the General Assembly was called for the special session to convene.

Delaware could have been the 36th and last state needed to ratify the Nineteenth Amendment. Suffragists looked to encourage Delaware to become the state that put the amendment into the Constitution. Suffragists and anti-suffragists alike came to Dover to lobby the General Assembly on suffrage. It was written of Dover in the Philadelphia Inquirer that "Everybody and his mother and sister is heading for the State Capitol." A large amount of suffrage resources were devoted to Delaware during this time. The Governor, John G. Townsend, Jr., was supportive of women's suffrage, as were other politicians in the state. However, the legislators from Sussex County were more conservative.

When the General Assembly convened the special session they were considering both women's suffrage and a tax issue for the schools. Suffragists held mass meetings throughout the state and brought in prominent speakers like Catt to campaign. NAWSA sent more organizers, including Marjorie Shuler and Betsy Edwards. At the same time, anti-suffragists were also campaigning against the federal amendment.

On March 25, a hearing on women's suffrage was held in the General Assembly. The suffragists had two hours in the morning to speak and the anti-suffragists had the same in the afternoon. Both groups had thirty minutes each session to provide rebuttals. Catt and Hilles both spoke in favor of suffrage. After the hearing, lobbying took place by both groups.

Behind the scenes, a personal fight between a state representative, Daniel Layton and the governor, used women's suffrage as a proxy. Layton, who personally had supported women's suffrage in the past, decided to fight it in order to anger the governor. Other legislators were angry that they had received telegrams from President Wilson to support women's suffrage. The anti-suffragists had influential lobbyists and the representatives from Sussex County remained stubborn. Du Pont was brought back to Delaware to convince members of the General Assembly to support women's suffrage. While he did change some minds, it wasn't enough to budge Sussex County. Layton's group was resentful of du Pont's interference and did not want "rich outsiders" making decisions in local government.

On April 20, an enormous suffrage rally took place in Dover. Cars were decorated, women marched, and gave speeches all day in front of the State House and the Republican convention hall. Suffragists displayed petitions that contained signatures of around 20,000 Delaware women who wanted women's suffrage. A suffragist from Georgetown, Delaware in Sussex County, Robert G. Houston, also spoke at the rally. The rally helped cement the support of Republicans in the House of the General Assembly.

Delay tactics in the General Assembly were made several times throughout the special session for various reasons. Senator Thomas F. Gormley, who was involved in liquor interests, introduced on March 23 a bill that would force all U.S. Constitutional Amendments to go out to the citizens of Delaware as a referendum. Other legislators delayed votes until they thought they could get a win. Suffragists were involved in "kidnapping" a chair of a committee to the House to keep the amendment from going to the floor too soon.

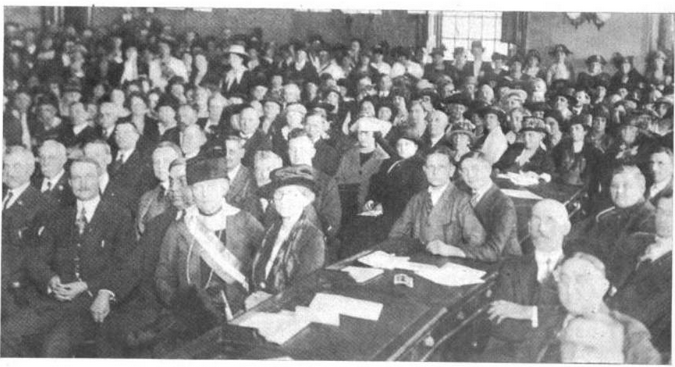
Suffragists watching the debate in the House of the Delaware General Assembly 1920.

On May 5, the Senate finally voted on the federal amendment and it passed 11 to 6. The Senate did not immediately give it to the House because they were unsure it would pass yet. John E. "Bull" McNabb "assaulted" suffrage supporters in the Assembly who were delaying the vote and anti-suffragist Mary Wilson Thompson egged him on. McNabb also expressed racist ideas about women's suffrage, which Emma Gibson Sykes called out in a Sunday Morning Star editorial. Thompson's influence in the House of the General Assembly kept the majority of the representatives from supporting women's suffrage.

Finally, the vote on the federal amendment went to the House on May 28. More suffrage backers came to Dover to support the effort. However, the amendment did not pass the House and the General Assembly adjourned on June 2, without approving the Nineteenth Amendment. Anti-suffragists "shouted and sang" when the General Assembly didn't ratify the amendment. Thompson was congratulated for her role in working against women's suffrage.

Hilles, along with others, went to Tennessee to lobby for ratification of the federal Amendment. Tennessee became the 36th and final state needed to ratify the Nineteenth Amendment. DESA and the Suffrage Committee of Delaware went on to become the League of Women Voters (LWV) of Delaware. Delaware belatedly ratified the Nineteenth Amendment on March 6, 1923.

== African-American women's suffrage in Delaware ==
African-American teachers at Howard High School held a women's suffrage debate and hosted Mary Church Terrell at the school's commencement exercises in June 1895. Teachers at the school also created the Wilmington Equal Suffrage Study Club (WESSC) on March 19, 1914. The founders of the group included Alice Gertrude Baldwin, Alice Dunbar Nelson, and Blanche Williams Stubbs. They met at the home of Emma Gibson Sykes. Members of the group felt that gaining women's suffrage would help improve racial equality.

Black suffragists from Wilmington marched in the May 2, 1914, suffrage parade and were led by Stubbs. However, the Black and white suffragists marched separately. The participation of WESSC was nearly erased from history. Drafts of the report from the parade initially included WESSC, though they were later edited out before publication.

During WWI, Black women suffragists in Delaware aided the war effort. They helped work in segregated Army camps and WESSC was active in many different war efforts. Dunbar Nelson served on the Women's Committee of the Council of National Defense. Howard High School staff and Nelson organized a patriotic parade in 1918.

While most women's suffrage efforts remained segregated in Delaware, Florence Bayard Hilles, a white suffragist, worked with Dunbar Nelson to give speeches at Black women's clubs and churches. Hilles worked to recruit Black women into the National Woman's Party (NWP). While Hilles had worked as an ally to Black women, the leader of NWP, Alice Paul, dismissed the disenfranchisement of Black women who asked the group for help. Among the sixty women who approached NWP about the issue were Dunbar Nelson, Stubbs, and Mary J Johnson Woodlen.

After the passage of the Nineteenth Amendment, Black women mobilized to register to vote in Wilmington. Most Black women did not face significant discrimination in registering or voting in Delaware.

== Anti-suffrage in Delaware ==
Many wealthy people in Delaware opposed women's suffrage. One prominent anti-suffragist in Delaware, Mary Wilson Thompson, wrote that when women voted, it "cheapened womanhood." She also felt that women would not have the neutrality needed to properly lobby for civic causes if they were allowed to vote. Thompson was the president of the Delaware Association Opposed to Woman Suffrage (DAOWS), formed in 1914. Another wealthy, independent woman who opposed women's suffrage was Emily Bissell who already had the ear of legislators through her own influence. Bissell did not believe that "political purification" of politics followed giving women the vote, therefore, she did not see an advantage to women in Delaware voting. Other women feared voting would be an "insult" to their husbands or that voting would change traditional gender roles.

Anti-suffragists also felt that African-American women would be "unfit voters." Antis used racist language to keep the idea in the mind of legislators that women's suffrage would include Black women's suffrage, too.

== See also ==
- List of Delaware suffragists
- Timeline of women's suffrage in Delaware
- Women's suffrage in states of the United States
- Women's suffrage in the United States
