= Timeline of women's suffrage in Delaware =

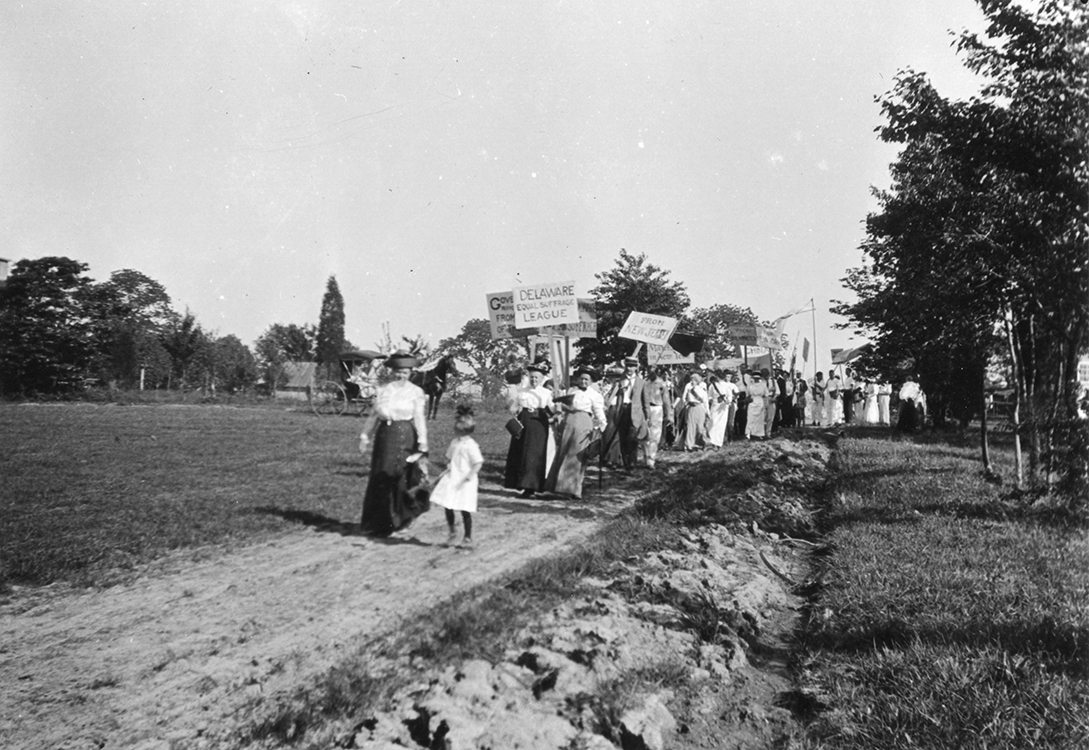
Arden, Delaware suffrage parade c. 1913

This is a timeline of women's suffrage in Delaware. Suffragists in Delaware began to fight for women's suffrage in the late 1860s. Mary Ann Sorden Stuart and national suffragists lobbied the Delaware General Assembly for women's suffrage. In 1896, the Delaware Equal Suffrage Association (DESA) was formed. Annual state suffrage conventions were held. There were also numerous attempts to pass an equal suffrage amendment to the Delaware State Constitution, but none were successful. In 1913, a state chapter of the Congressional Union (CU) was opened by Mabel Vernon. Delaware suffragists are involved in more militant tactics, including taking part of the Silent Sentinels. On March 22, 1920, Delaware had a special session of the General Assembly to consider ratification of the Nineteenth Amendment. It was not ratified by Delaware until 1923.

== 19th century ==
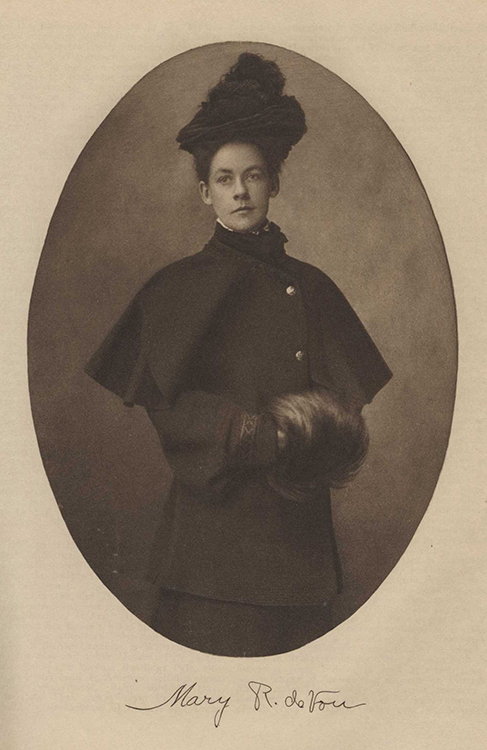
Delaware suffragist, Mary R. de Vou c. 1892

=== 1860s ===
1869

- November 12: Women's rights convention held in Wilmington, Delaware. Delaware Suffrage Association is formed and affiliates with the American Woman Suffrage Association (AWSA).

=== 1870s ===
1878

- Mary Ann Sorden Stuart speaks in favor of women's suffrage at the United States Senate Judiciary Committee.

=== 1880s ===
1881

- Stuart, Susan B. Anthony and Elizabeth Cady Stanton lobby the Delaware General Assembly to amend the state constitution in favor of women's suffrage.

1888

- The Delaware chapter of the Women's Christian Temperance Union (WCTU) endorses women's suffrage.
- Delaware WCTU sets up a "franchise department."

=== 1890s ===
1895

- June: Mary Church Terrell speaks at the Commencement of Howard High School.
- November 18: The Wilmington Suffrage Club (or Association) is formed.

1896

- January 17–18: First annual state suffrage convention is held in Wilmington. The Delaware Equal Suffrage Association (DESA) was formed and affiliated with the National American Women's Suffrage Association (NAWSA).
- November 27: Second annual state suffrage convention is held in Wilmington.

1897

- January 13: Prominent suffragists speak in favor of women's suffrage at a hearing at the Delaware constitutional convention.
- February 16: Voting was held on a proposition to not include "male" as a description of a voter in the state constitution, but it did not pass.
- April 22–23: National suffrage convention is held in Wilmington.
- December 2: Third annual state suffrage convention is held in Delaware.

1899

- December 15: State suffrage meeting held in Wilmington Unitarian Church with Carrie Chapman Catt as featured speaker.

== 20th century ==
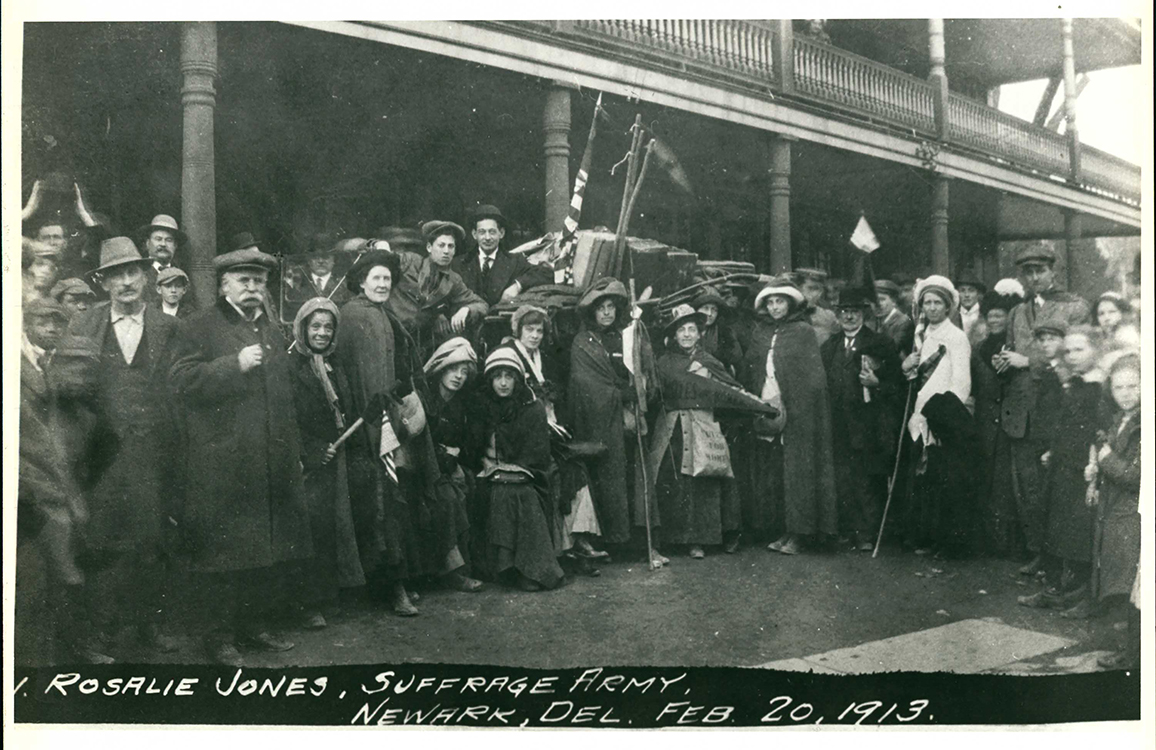
Rosalie Jones and her "suffrage army" in Newark, Delaware, February 20, 1913

=== 1900s ===
1900

- Some women who pay a property tax are allowed to vote for school commissioners in Delaware.
- November 15: State suffrage meeting was held in New Castle, Delaware.

1901

- November 6: The state suffrage convention is held in Newport, Delaware.

1902

- November 8: The state suffrage convention takes place in Wilmington.

1903

- November 28: The state suffrage convention is held in Newport.

1904

- November 22: The state suffrage convention is held in Wilmington.

1905

- November 4: The state suffrage convention takes place in New Castle.

1906

- November 6 : The state suffrage convention is held in Newport, Delaware.

1907

- October 2: The state suffrage convention is held in Wilmington.

1908

- November 12: The state suffrage convention is held in Newport.

1909

- DESA helps NAWSA with a petition drive for a federal suffrage amendment.
- November 29: The state suffrage convention is held in Wilmington.

=== 1910s ===
1910

- November 10: The state suffrage convention is held in Wilmington.

1911

- November 9: The annual state suffrage convention is held in Newport.

1912

- November 20: The state suffrage convention is held in Wilmington.
- The Arden Colony forms a women's suffrage group.

1913

- Equal Suffrage amendment for the Delaware constitution does not pass out of the General Assembly.
- January 4: Suffragists in Wilmington speak to the Charter Commission and ask for municipal women's suffrage, but it does not pass.
- February 18–20: The Wilmington suffrage group sponsored Rosalie Gardiner Jones and her pilgrims.
- March 3: Delaware sends suffragists to the Woman Suffrage Procession in Washington, D.C.
- April 7: Delaware is part of the procession that marches to the Capitol with letters to the U.S. Congress.
- Summer: Mabel Vernon is hired as the Delaware Congressional Union (CU) organizer.
- September: CU and DESA open up joint women's suffrage headquarters in Wilmington.
- November 6: The state suffrage convention is held in Wilmington.

1914

- May 2: Large women's suffrage parade in Wilmington.
- May 9: Delaware is represented in a national suffrage parade in Washington, D.C.
- Summer: Florence Bayard Hilles and Elsie Hill go on a two-day suffrage tour of 7 Delaware towns.
- October 30: The annual state suffrage club takes place in Dover.

1915

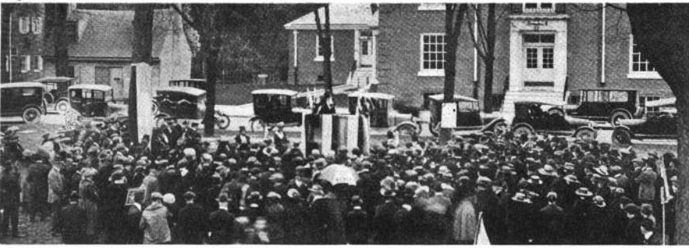
Suffrage rally on Dover Green on Convention Day, 1920

- Hilles drives through Delaware in her car, the "Votes for Women Flyer."
- February–March: Blanche Williams Stubbs and Mary J Johnson Woodlen are published in Wilmington newspapers on the issue of racism against Black women's suffrage.
- March: Another equal suffrage amendment fails in the General Assembly.
- June : DESA moves out of the joint headquarters when they split with CU.
- November 11: Annual state suffrage convention is held in Wilmington.

1916

- July 8 : Mary Ospina of DESA polls members of the Delaware General Assembly on where they stand on women's suffrage.
- November 10: State suffrage convention is held in Wilmington.

1917

- January: Governor John G. Townsend, Jr., comes out in support of women's suffrage.
- February: A full equal suffrage bill is defeated in the General Assembly.
- March 1: "Delaware Day" in the Silent Sentinel picket of the White House where all women are from Delaware.
- November 22: State suffrage convention is held in Newport.
- November 23: DESA states that the group is officially opposed to picketing.

1918

- May: Women's suffrage petition campaign to send to congress is launched at the Hotel DuPont in Wilmington.
- November 29: State suffrage convention is held in Wilmington.

1919

- January: Maria McMahon comes to Delaware to open suffrage headquarters in Dover.
- February: Suffragists send around 600 telegrams to their U.S. Senators to support the federal amendment for women's suffrage.
- June 26: DESA celebrates the congressional approval of a federal suffrage amendment.
- August 3: National Women's Party (NWP) hold a ratification rally in Wilmington.
- August 9: Dover, Delaware holds a ratification rally.
- November: State suffrage convention takes place in Dover.

=== 1920s ===
1920

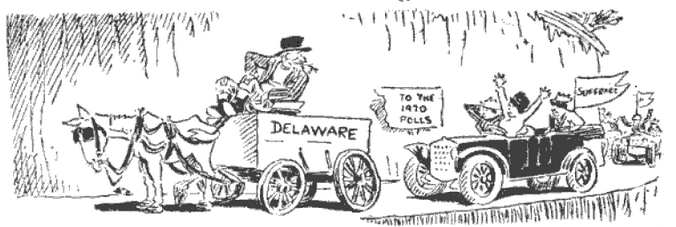
Suffrage cartoon from Dayton Herald in 1920

- March 22: A special session of the Delaware General Assembly is convened.
- March 25: A hearing on women's suffrage takes place in the General Assembly.
- April 5: Emma Gibson Sykes is published in the Sunday Star where she decries racist opposition to women's suffrage.
- April 20: A large suffrage rally is held in Dover.
- May 5: The General Assembly Senate approves the federal suffrage amendment.
- May 28: The General Assembly House votes against the federal suffrage amendment.
- June 2: The Delaware General Assembly ends its session without ratifying the 19th Amendment.

1923

- Delaware ratifies the 19th Amendment.

== See also ==
- List of Delaware suffragists
- Women's suffrage in Delaware
- Women's suffrage in states of the United States
- Women's suffrage in the United States
