= Ginn =

Ginn or GINN may refer to:

- Ginn, a character appearing in the television series Stargate Universe
- Ginn & Co., an imprint of Pearson Education
- Ginn & Co Solicitors, a UK law firm
- Ginn and Company, a UK publisher, part of the Penguin Group
- Bobby Ginn (born 1949), owner of Ginn Resorts and the NASCAR Nextel Cup team Ginn Racing
- Greg Ginn (born 1954), American musical artist
- Hubert Ginn (1947–2023), American football running back
- J.T. Ginn (born 1999), American baseball player
- Samantha Ginn, American actress and stage director
- Samuel Ginn (born 1937), American businessman and namesake of the Samuel Ginn College of Engineering at Auburn University
- Ted Ginn Jr. (born 1985), American football wide receiver
- Ted Ginn Sr. (born 1955), American football coach

== See also ==
- Senator Ginn (disambiguation)
- Ginns, a surname
