= Mary J. Johnson Woodlen =

African-American suffragist in Wilmington, Delaware

- Born: 1870; Virginia
- Died: February 8, 1933 (aged 62–63); Wilmington, Delaware
- Occupation: Suffragist
- Spouse(s): John H. Woodlen, Sr.
- Children: 2 Step-children
- Parent(s): James and Edmonia (Garnet) Johnson

Mary J. Johnson Woodlen (1870-1933) was an influential suffragist in Wilmington, Delaware. She was vice president of the Wilmington chapter of NAACP, a founding member of the Wilmington Equal Suffrage Study Club, and a major religious speaker at Methodist churches in the area.

== Biography ==
Mary J. Johnson was born in 1870 in Virginia to James and Edmonia (Garnet) Johnson.

By 1900, she moved to Wilmington, Delaware. She married John H. Woodlen, Sr., who was a widower with two children.

Woodlen volunteered at the Layton Home for Aged Colored Persons, and served on the home's Senior Board during the 1910's. She worked with other active suffragists like Blanche Williams Stubbs and Florence Bayard Hilles, who were part of the Junior Board.

In 1913, she worked with Stubbs, Dr. J. Bacon Stubbs, and Alice Dunbar to incorporate a new social service agency: the Thomas Garrett Settlement. This offered programs like kindergarten, art and music classes, athletics, health clinic, and meeting spaces.

Woodlen became the vice president of the Wilmington chapter of the NAACP in 1914.

In 1916, she formed the Delaware Federation of Colored Women's Clubs, and at their annual meeting in 1918, she became the chaplain. The Federation sponsored an Industrial School for Colored Girls, and Woodlen was on the school's board of directors.

=== Suffrage Activism ===
Woodlen was part of the Equal Suffrage Study Club from its inception on March 19, 1914. The meeting was held at the home of Emma Gibson Sykes, and Woodlen was a major part of the club's activist work. The participants created networks to support the community and suffrage efforts. This included the Howard School, the Layton and Sarah Ann White homes, the Garrett Settlement, the NAACP, and other local African American women's clubs. This was one of Delaware's most active suffragist groups.

In May 1914, Wilmington held its first suffrage parade and the Equal Suffrage Study Club marched as a contingent, leading the segregated section at the back of the parade.

Woodlen also made her voice known by writing to local papers. One letter to the editor addressed a racist editorial that opposed enfranchisement for African American women with demeaning stereotypes. Woodlen's response challenged the assumption that Black women would vote mindlessly for Republicans.

In February 1921, the National Woman's Party (NWP) unveiled a statue of Lucretia Mott and Elizabeth Cady Stanton in Washington, D.C.. Addie Hunton of the NAACP was appalled that the NWP refused to defend African American women's voting rights, and Alice Dunbar-Nelson formed a delegation of six Delaware women, including Woodlen and Stubbs, to go to Washington and confront NWP president Alice Paul.

They joined a larger contingent already in Washington led by Mary Church Terrell. They held a protest at the 19th St. Baptist Church against the "flagrant disregard of the enforcement of the 19th amendment in the Southern states." They traveled to the headquarters of the NWP to address Paul, but the chairwoman insisted that disenfranchisement was a race issue, not a woman's issue.

Woodlen continued to support the Republican Party in Delaware. She led registration and voting drives in Black neighborhoods, and supported the election of Conwell Banton, an African American physician, to the Board of Education.

Woodlen had a key role in the Wilmington Colored Women's Republican Club, also called the League of Colored Republican Women. Their mission was to register 100% of the colored women in the city, and they held registration and get-out-the-vote efforts for the November 1920 election. Woodlen was elected to the finance committee.

In 1924, she ran to be a delegate at the Republican State Convention. She was a visible presence in the 1924 and 1928 presidential elections in her role as an elected committeewoman.

She was much in demand for her spiritual guidance, especially in Methodist churches. Newspaper announcements contained regular notices of her sermons and addresses.

=== Later life and death ===
Her husband died in 1915, and she lived with her stepson John.

On February 8, 1933, Woodlen died of diabetes and a cerebral hemmorage. She was buried at Mt. Olive cemetery.

== See also ==
- African-American women's suffrage movement
- Black suffrage in the United States
- Equal Suffrage Study Club
- Women's suffrage in Delaware
