= Arniel =

Arniel is a surname. Notable people with the name include:

- Annie Arniel (1873–1924), American suffragist and women's rights advocate
- Jamie Arniel (born 1989), Canadian ice hockey player
- Scott Arniel (born 1962), Canadian ice hockey player and coach
