= Susie Estella Palmer Hamilton =

American suffragist (1862-1942)

Susie Estella Palmer Hamilton (1862–1942) was an American suffragist and activist in Wilmington, Delaware, and a founding member of the Equal Suffrage Study Club.

== Early life ==
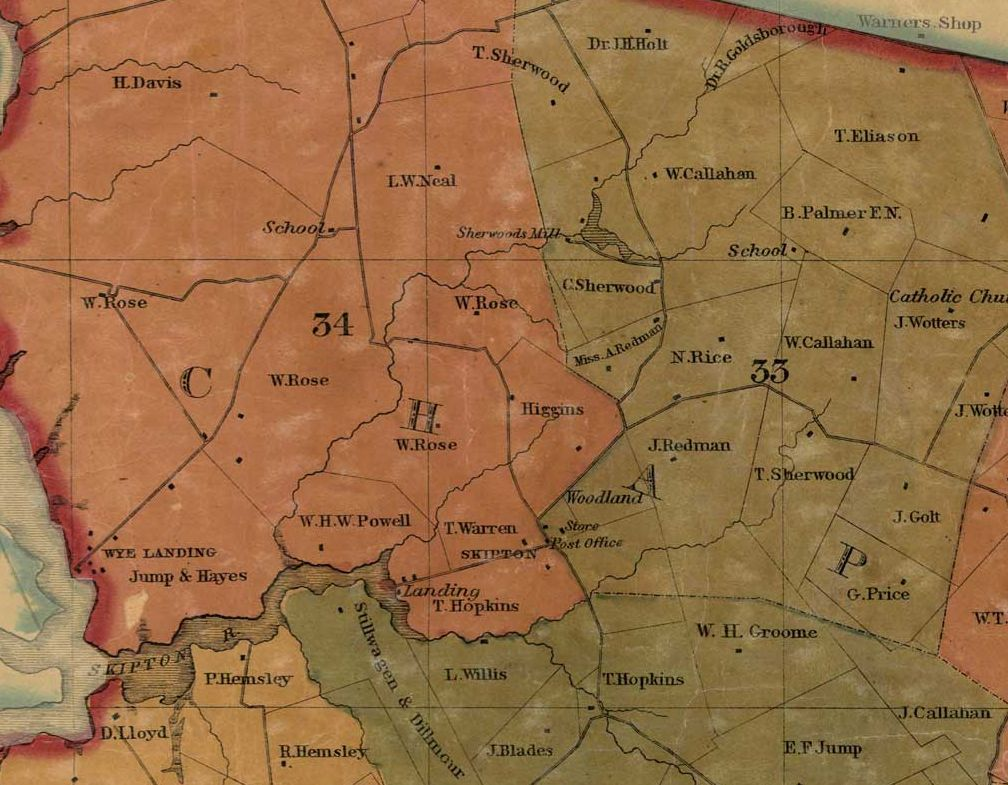
Map depicting Palmer farm, Talbot County, Maryland, 1858.

Susie Estella Palmer Hamilton was born in 1862 in Talbot County, Maryland. She was the granddaughter of farmers Milly Richardson Palmer and Benjamin Palmer, who appeared on an 1858 map of Talbot County as "B. Palmer, F.N" (free negro). Benjamin Palmer was free when the majority of African Americans in Maryland were enslaved: in 1850, there were 90,368 individuals enslaved in Maryland, outnumbering the free population of 74,723. Hamilton's parents, Wesley and Charlotte Palmer, were free as well, and continued farming in Talbot County.

By 1880, Hamilton was working as a cook in Baltimore, where she lived at a boarding house along with her sisters Amelia and Elizabeth. She had moved to Delaware by 1882. That year, when Hamilton was twenty, she married Snowden Francis Hamilton at Ezion Methodist Episcopal Church in Wilmington, New Castle County. Also a native of Maryland, he worked as a railroad porter and, later, a chef. Susie Hamilton continued to work as a cook, and the couple lived at a home they purchased in 1891 at 916 Wilson Street in Wilmington's East Side.

Hamilton returned to Maryland briefly to serve as her father's executor when he died in 1906, where he still had a farm in Talbot County. She inherited one third of his property.

== Activism ==
Main articles: Suffragette, NAACP

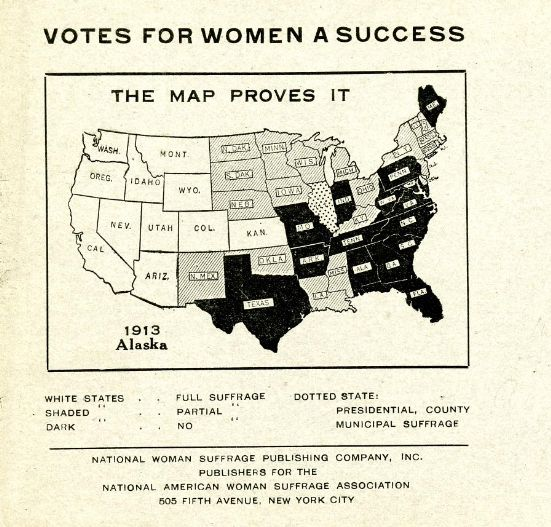
Votes for Women a Success

In March 1914, Hamilton co-founded Wilmington's Equal Suffrage Study Club. The club focused on studying suffrage issues at every level, whether local, state, national, or worldwide, especially as relating to women's rights and advancement. Her fellow members included Wilmington activists Blanche Williams Stubbs, Fannie Hopkins Hamilton, Emma Belle Gibson Sykes, Alice M. Dunbar-Nelson, and Bessie Spence Dorrell. The year prior, the National American Woman Suffrage Association had published a widely distributed postcard entitled "Votes for Women a Success." In spite of the title, the postcard showed Delaware among the states with only partial suffrage, representing the issue that likely prompted Hamilton's activism.

On May 2, 1914, four hundred women demonstrated by marching through Wilmington, Delaware, in the state's first suffrage parade. The Equal Suffrage Study Club led the segregated section in the rear of the march. The same month, W.E.B. DuBois's "The Crisis" noted that disenfranchisement of both male and female voters continued to be an issue in New Castle County. That June, the club debuted a lecture series held at Bethel A.M.E. Church, hosting a talk by a former Senator Washburn from Hamilton's home state of Maryland, focusing on the significance of the suffrage movement for African American women.

In 1915, Hamilton joined the local branch of the NAACP, the same year the branch was chartered under the leadership Alice Dunbar-Nelson, a co-founder of the Equal Suffrage Study Club. In spite of Delaware's failure to ratify the Nineteenth Amendment, national suffrage for women was won in August 1920, and Hamilton registered to vote that year. She and her fellow members of the Equal Suffrage Study Club worked to encourage African American women to register in time to vote in the 1920 election Eight years later, Hamilton appealed against an attempt by a Wilmington voter registrar to remove her from the voting list. She won her appeal, and continued to exercise her voting rights.

Hamilton also was involved in Wilmington's African American community beyond suffrage, serving on committees for Ezion Methodist Episcopal Church, where her husband was a trustee. Hamilton's love for her community continued to show up in newspapers only five days after the suffrage parade, when she served on a committee organizing and hosting of a church event featuring young adult musical talent. She also helped raise funds for the nearby Sarah Ann White Home for Aged Colored Persons.

== Later years ==
Hamilton died in Philadelphia from pancreatic cancer on December 26, 1942, when she was fifty-one. Her husband Snowden had died seven years earlier, and both are buried in Mount Olive Cemetery in Wilmington, Delaware.
