= Sunday Star =

Sunday Star may refer to:

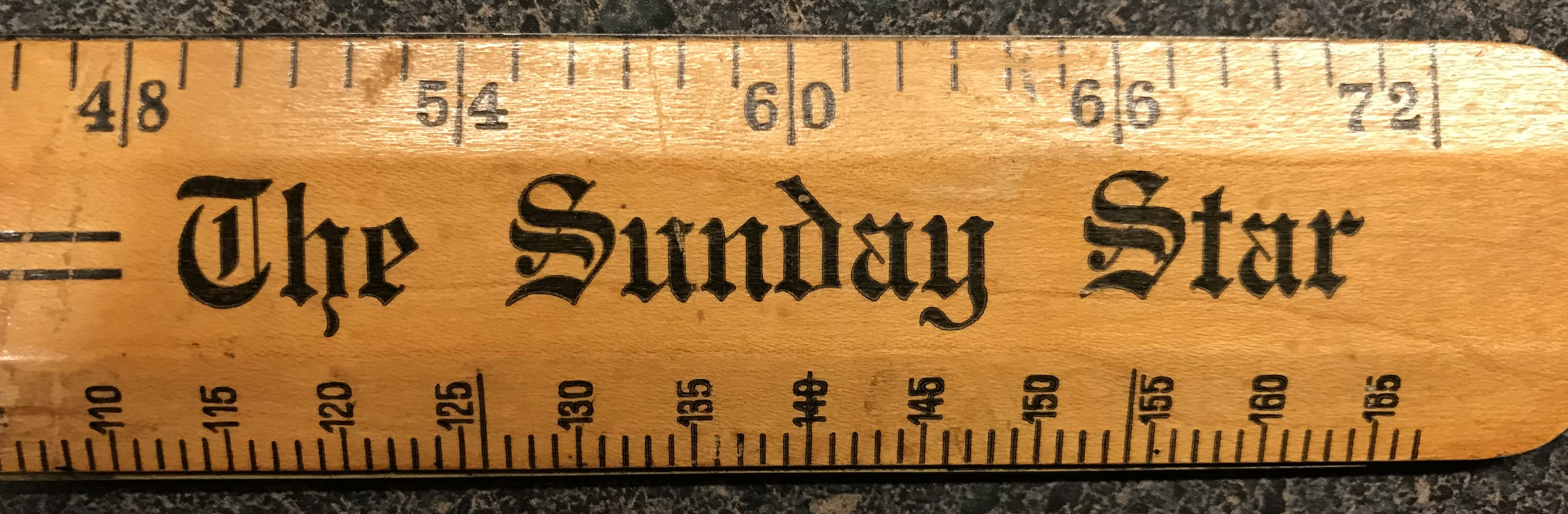
The Sunday Star

- Daily Star (Louisiana), a daily newspaper in Hammond, Louisiana, United States
- Daily Star Sunday, a weekly newspaper in London, England, UK
- Sunday Morning Star, a weekly newspaper in Wilmington, Delaware, United States
- The Sunday Star, a weekly newspaper in Auckland, New Zealand; predecessor to the Sunday Star-Times
- The Washington Star, a daily newspaper in Washington, D.C., United States

== See also ==
- Sunday Times-Star
- The Star on Saturday / The Saturday Star, special weekly edition of The Toronto Star daily newspaper in Toronto, Ontario, Canada
- Sunday (disambiguation)
- Star (disambiguation)
