= Ginns =

Ginns is a surname. Notable people with the surname include:

- Russell Ginns (fl. from 1991), American author and game designer
- Sallie Topkis Ginns (1880–1976), American suffragist

== See also ==
- Ginn (disambiguation)
