= Equal Suffrage Study Club =

African-American women's suffrage organization

The Wilmington Equal Suffrage Study Club (WESSC) was the name of an African American women's suffrage organization, founded in Wilmington, Delaware, in March 1914.

== History ==
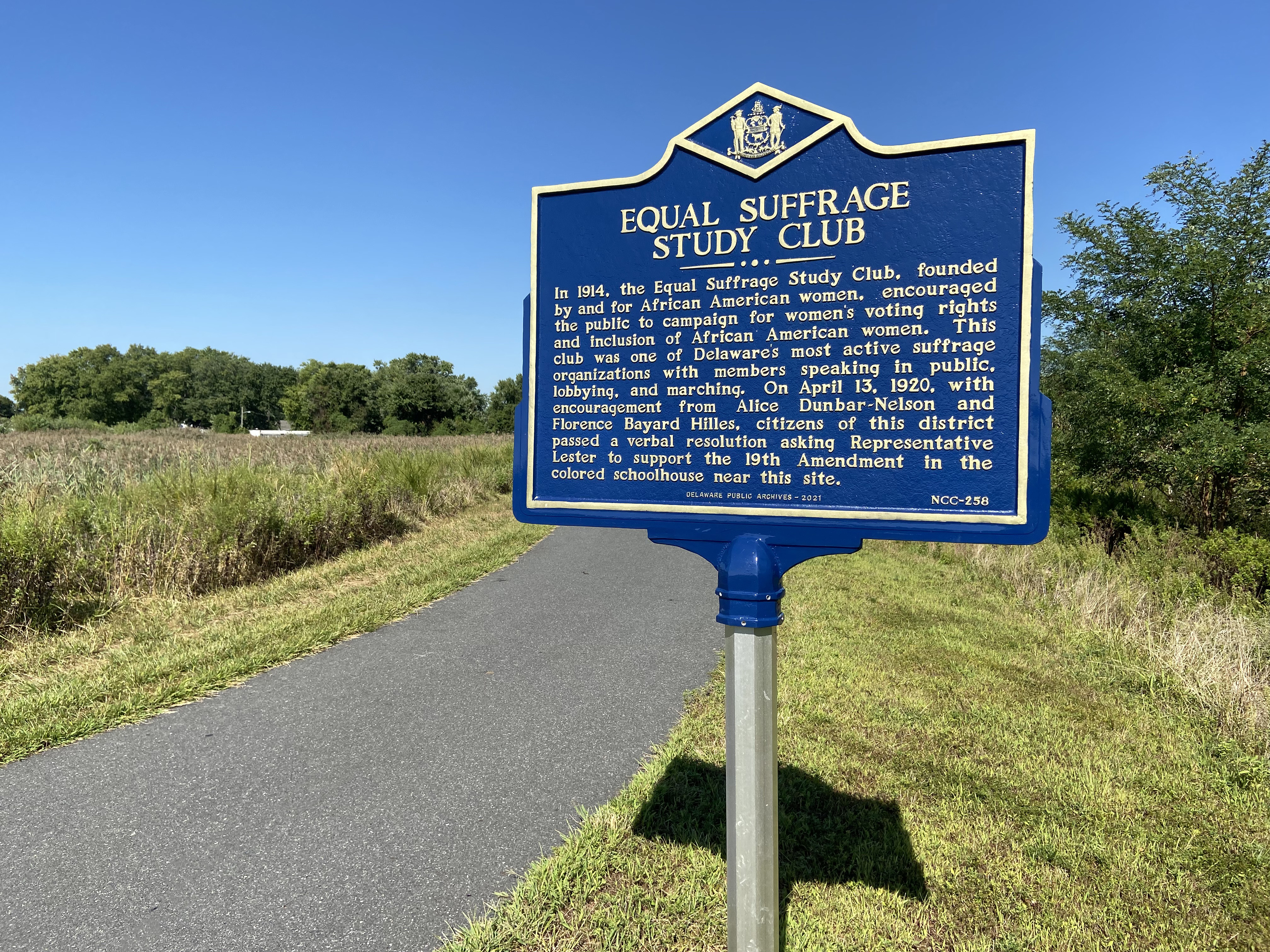
Historical marker for the Equal Suffrage Study Club along the Chesapeake & Delaware Canal Trail

The Equal Suffrage Study Club was founded in the East Side of Wilmington, Delaware, at the Thomas Garrett House. The club focused on studying suffrage issues at every level, whether local, state, national, or worldwide, especially as relating to women's rights and advancement.

Fannie Hopkins Hamilton served as the founding treasurer and Bessie Spence Dorrell served as the founding secretary. The club also included fellow Wilmington activists Susie Estella Palmer Hamilton, Emma Belle Gibson Sykes, Alice M. Dunbar-Nelson, Mary J. Johnson Woodlen, Blanche Williams Stubbs, and Mary E. Taylor.

On May 2, 1914, four hundred women demonstrated by marching through Wilmington, Delaware, in the state's first suffrage parade. The Equal Suffrage Study Club led the segregated section in the rear of the parade. On June 7, 1914, the club held "the first of a series of public meetings in Bethel A.M.E. Church," and hosted a talk by former Maryland senator Washburn focusing on the significance of the suffrage movement for African American women.

The club was one of Delaware's most active group of suffragists, with members speaking in public, lobbying, and marching.

== Legacy ==
On August 19, 2020, the Delaware House of Representatives passed a resolution celebrating the centennial of the passing of the 19th Amendment, noting that "a woman’s right to vote would not have been possible without the tireless efforts of Delaware women from the National Women’s Party Suffragists, the Wilmington Equal Suffrage Study Club Suffragists, and the Delaware Equal Suffrage Association Suffragists."
