= Matilda Hall Gardner =

American suffragist

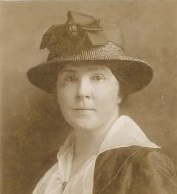
- Born: Matilda Hall; December 31, 1871; Washington, D.C.
- Died: March 15, 1954 (aged 82)
- Occupation: Suffragist
- Spouse: Harry Gilson Gardner

Matilda Hall Gardner (1871–1954) was an American suffragist and a member of the national executive committee of the National Woman's Party.

== Life ==
Gardner was born in Washington, D.C., on December 31, 1871, to Frederick Hillsgrove Hall, editor of the Chicago Tribune, and Matilda L. Campbell. She attended school in Chicago, Paris, and Brussels, and attended and hosted society events in Chicago with her mother. On November 3, 1900, she married Harry "Dyke" Gilson Gardner, who was then a Washington correspondent for the Chicago Journal. She later worked as a Washington correspondent for the Scripps newspaper chain, with a circle of friends that included President Theodore Roosevelt. Gardner was a member of Washington high society, belonged to many clubs, and sat on many committees. She was involved in the arts, sitting on the executive committee of the Drama League and belonging to the National Folk-Craft Society.

The Gardners were also active supporters of progressive politics. Matilda was an officer of the Committee for Progressive Political Action and strongly advocated for the founding of the Progressive Party.

Gardner was brought to suffrage work through her activity with the Settlement house in the Southwestern part of Washington, the Neighborhood House.

She became one of the original core of activists who worked with Alice Paul and Lucy Burns when they first came to Washington to work for the Congressional Committee. In 1913, she helped Paul organize the March 3 Woman Suffrage Procession and participated in the April 7 Capitol demonstration. She later before the Equal Suffrage Association of Glencoe, Maryland, where she predicted upcoming equal suffrage. In December 1913, Gardner was appointed chairman of a suffragist committee that was organizing testimony for a House suffrage hearing, and she was elected as a delegate to the next national convention of the State Equal Suffrage Association. In 1914, Gardner became a member of the national executive committee of the National Woman's Party, a position she would hold until at least 1921, when she participated in a conference with President Warren G. Harding to remove gender discrimination from federal laws.

In 1915, she joined the NWP's press bureau. By the fall of 1914, Paul and Burns had brought Gardner onto the executive committee of the Congressional Union.

Gardner played a key role in the 1915 First National Convention of the Congressional Union for Woman Suffrage. Gardner lobbied Congress for equal suffrage, even writing an article for The Atlantic describing her interactions with Congressmen.

In 1915, Gardner became involved in activism surrounding World War I. She was an executive member of the Rational Defense League. She also believed that women's suffrage would help prevent "useless wars." She remained insistent, though, that woman's suffrage was a pressing need, and women should not "wait and trust to the gratitude of men after the war."

On Bastille Day, July 14, 1917, Gardner participated in a protest with the Silent Sentinels. Gardner and fifteen other suffragists, chosen for their status in society, picketed and were arrested for unlawful assembly and obstructing traffic. On July 17, these women were sentenced to 60 days in Occoquan Workhouse, where they were harshly treated.

Gardner spoke with her attorney and published in the Suffragist about having her clothes removed, showering with open doors, wearing workhouse clothes, eating food with worms in it, living in enforced silence, and working for long hours. Later that year, she returned to Occoquan as counsel for interned suffragists. She advocated for these women, writing to Commissioner Brownlow, Superintendent Whitaker, and John Joy Edson, president of Associated Charities about how "For four days they have not been out of the buildings except to walk from one building to another" and calling for the suffragists to be able to exercise outdoors.

On January 13, 1919, she was sentenced to 5 days in District Jail for building "watch fires" in front of the White House. In jail, she participated in a hunger strike with 22 other convicted suffragists.

Following the passing of the 19th Amendment, Gardner remained involved in politics. In 1923, she served on the Women's Committee for the Recognition of Russia. In 1924, she was involved in Robert M. La Follette's presidential campaign. She was also involved in organizations that pursued world peace and the release of political prisoners, including the Women's Disarmament Committee.

Like many of the Silent Sentinels, Gardner went into business, running a bookshop.

Matilda Hall Gardner died on March 15, 1954, aged 82, at Circle Terrace Hospital in Alexandria, Virginia.
