= Emma Belle Gibson Sykes =

American suffragist

- Born: Emma Belle Gibson; October 8, 1885; Christiana, Delaware, U.S.
- Died: December 31, 1970 (aged 85); Wilmington, Delaware, U.S.
- Occupations: Suffragist, activist
- Spouse: George J. Sykes

Emma Belle Gibson Sykes (October 8, 1885 – December 31, 1970) was a suffragist and civil rights activist.

== Biography ==
Sykes née Gibson was born on October 8, 1885, in Christiana, Delaware. She attended the segregated Howard High School in Wilmington. After her graduation in 1903 she began her teaching career. In 1911 she married George J. Sykes, a dentist. The couple settled in at 208 East 10th in Wilmington.

Around 1914 Sykes was involved with the formation of the Equal Suffrage Study Club in Wilmington along with other Howard High School teachers Alice Gertrude Baldwin, Alice Ruth Moore Dunbar, Nellie B. Nicholson, Susie Estella Palmer Hamilton, Caroline B. Williams, and Blanche Williams Stubbs . At the same time, she was involved in the formation of the Wilmington branch of the National Association for the Advancement of Colored People (NAACP).

In 1920 the Delaware state legislature was considering ratification the Nineteenth Amendment to the United States Constitution. Several representatives argued that the amendment should not be ratified because it would enfranchise all women, not just white women. Sykes wrote a letter to the editor of the Wilmington Sunday Morning Star condemning the argument and emphasizing that the vote belonged to all women. The letter was published on April 4, 1920. The amendment was not ratified by the Delaware legislation.

Once the ratification of the Nineteenth Amendment prevailed nationally, Sykes turned her attention to registering African-American women and encouraging voting. She remained politically active on the state and local level and continued her involvement with the NAACP as well as the Delaware Federation of Colored Women's Clubs and the Howard High School Alumni Association.

In 1963 Sykes was honored by Howard High School Alumni Association for several "firsts":

- "First Negro woman to hold public office in Delaware" (appointed New Castle County Register of Wills)
- "First woman elected to the vestry of the Episcopal Diocese of Delaware"
- "Developer and first teacher of business education at Howard High School"
- "Only Negro woman living who worked successfully for women's suffrage and marched up Market Street in a victory parade"

Sykes died on December 31, 1970, in Wilmington.
