= Mary Clare Brassington =

American suffragist

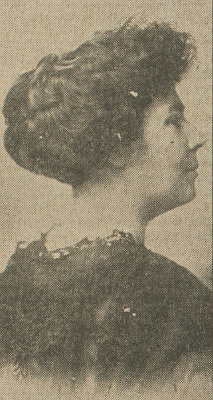
- Mary Clare Brassington, from a 1917 publication
- Born: Mary Clare Laurence; June 5, 1874; Baltimore, Maryland, US
- Died: January 6, 1966 (aged 91); Fort Lauderdale, Florida, US
- Occupation: Suffragist
- Known for: President of the Delaware Equal Suffrage Society, 1915–1917

Mary Clare Laurence Brassington (June 5, 1874 – January 6, 1966) was an American suffragist, president of the Delaware Equal Suffrage Association (DESA) from 1915 to 1917.

== Early life ==
Mary Clare Laurence was born in Baltimore, Maryland.

== Career ==
Brassington marched with the Delaware Equal Suffrage Association (DESA) in the 1913 suffrage parade in Washington, D.C., and led the "homemakers' section" in Delaware's first large suffrage parade in 1914. She became president of the DESA in 1915, succeeding the association's founding president, Martha Churchman Cranston, and reelected in 1916. She was also one of the state's delegates to the National Equal Suffrage Convention. and a member of the National American Woman Suffrage Association (NAWSA). She was also active in Wilmington's New-Century Club.

In 1916, Brassington attended both the Democratic National Convention in St. Louis and the Republican National Convention in Chicago, where she literally carried the banner of the Delaware suffragists: a large yellow and white silk banner featuring Delaware Blue Hens.

In 1917 Brassington resigned the presidency because her husband's work would take her out of state. But she returned to Delaware to attend DESA meetings and lobby the state legislature on suffrage. After suffrage was won, Brassington was active in the League of Women Voters. She lived in Port Arthur, Ontario and Milwaukee, Wisconsin in her later years, relocating for her husband's work, and in Florida in her own retirement.

== Personal life ==
Mary Clare Laurence married John Robert Wetten Brassington, a British engineer who was born in India. They had two daughters, Marion and Susan. She was a member of the First Unitarian Church in Wilmington. Brassington was widowed in 1946 when her husband died in Milwaukee, and she died in Fort Lauderdale, Florida, in 1966, aged 91 years.
