= Mary Wilson Thompson =

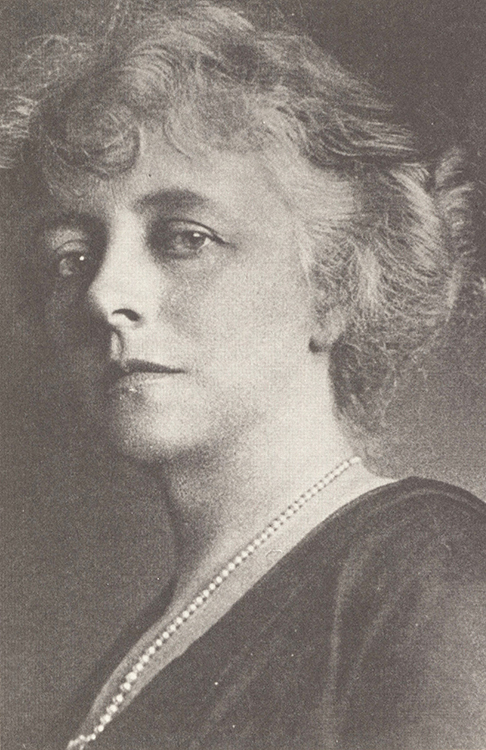
- Born: 1867
- Died: 1947 (aged 79–80)
- Children: Jim Thompson
- Parent(s): James H. Wilson

Mary Wilson Thompson (October 30, 1866 – April 2, 1947) was a Delaware civic leader. As leader of the Delaware Association Opposed to Woman Suffrage, she is credited with the Delaware General Assembly's failure to ratify the 19th Amendment, which granted women the right to vote in the United States.

== Life ==
Mary Wilson Thompson was born at Stockford Estate near Wilmington, Delaware, on October 30, 1866. She was the daughter of Civil War General James Harrison Wilson. She attended the fashionable Misses Hebb's School in Wilmington and travelled extensively before she married wealthy textile businessman Henry Burling Thompson. The couple were leaders in Wilmington civic society.

In a memoir written in the 1930s, Thompson explained her position against women's suffrage:

I have always opposed votes for women. It is constitutional with me. It is not that I feel women cannot vote or are not the mental equal of our men folks, but I feel that it is duplicating our work. It is putting an extra burden on the women and it has weakened materially our power with the legislatures.

Thompson drew upon her connections to influence politicians against voting for suffrage. She wrote to President Woodrow Wilson, a friend of her husband's, in 1916:

A woman can be one of the most useful & ornamental creatures in her own sphere, but in Politics she is dangerous, treacherous & revengeful - therefore sooner her political activity is curbed the better...

The same year she wrote to Willard Saulsbury, US Senator from Delaware, asking that he use his franking privileges to send 260 thousand pieces of anti-suffrage literature to West Virginia. He declined.

In March 1920, only one more state was needed to ratify the Nineteenth Amendment, making the Delaware State Legislature a pitched battleground where Thompson was at the forefront. She spoke before the legislature opposite such suffragists as Florence Bayard Hilles, Mabel Ridgely, and Carrie Chapman Catt. At one point she chased down a legislator and demanded he sign a proxy statement allowing her to act on his behalf. Twice after winning key legislative votes, Thompson was hoisted aloft in her chair by anti-suffragists. Despite these efforts, the Nineteenth Amendment was still ratified nationwide, with Tennessee being the deciding vote.

Decades later Thompson continued to assert that "the country has certainly not benefited by the women’s vote."

Thompson bought a lot on Park Avenue in Rehoboth Beach, Delaware, from Irénée du Pont and constructed a large two-story summer home there in 1927 she dubbed Mon Plaisir (French, "my pleasure"). She designed the home herself with the assistance of her son, who was studying architecture at Princeton University. It had large screened-in porches (or "mosquito parlors") necessitated by the presence of mosquitos. Mosquitos were so incessant that Thompson was forced to wrap newspaper around her ankles while gardening. Thompson enlisted Governor C. Douglass Buck to create two Civilian Conservation Corps camps at Lewes and Slaughter Beach to eradicate the mosquitos and their habitat.

Thompson was active in numerous civic causes and organization, including historic preservation and fighting infantile paralysis.

Historian Richard B. Carter wrote “Had she lived in a slightly later age, she could easily have won election to high political office (had she wished to pursue it). Yet she refused to consider that women should be made the political equals of men. She was a paradox of the passing of the Victorian era from Delaware.”

== Death and legacy ==
Mary Wilson Thompson died on April 2, 1947, at her home Brookwood Farm in Greenville, Delaware.

Thompson had five children. Her son James Harrison Wilson Thompson became a Thai silk magnate and disappeared under mysterious circumstances in Malaysia in 1967 and was declared dead in 1974. Her daughter Katherine Thompson Wood was bludgeoned to death in 1967 in a murder that remains unsolved.
