= Fannie Hopkins Hamilton =

African-American suffragist (1882–1964)

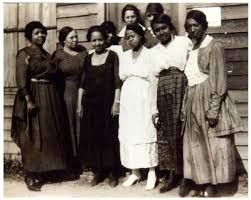
The Colored Woman's Republican Committee

Fannie Hopkins Hamilton (1882–1964) was an African-American dress maker and suffragist who joined the Equal Suffrage Study Club and uplifted the black community in Wilmington, Delaware. She was a leader, contributor, activist, and supportive teacher throughout her life as a suffragist.

== Background ==
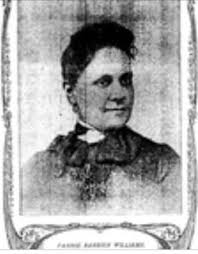
Fannie Hopkins Hamilton Grave Picture

Fannie Hopkins Hamilton was the founding treasurer of the Wilmington Equal Suffrage Study Club. She was born in 1882 in Queen Anne's County, Maryland, but later moved to Wilmington at the age of eight. Her father was a minister of the African Methodist Episcopal Church. Fannie married George W. Hamilton, a fireman, in 1901. Together, they had two daughters: Katherine and Georgina. During her years as a mother, Fannie sought an occupation as a seamstress and a dressmaker, later traveling to Philadelphia to pursue advanced training at Drexel University. Soon, she developed her own shop. She also began teaching classes at Wilmington “colored” schools and encountered Alice Moore Dunbar, who was an African-American political activist and poet during the Harlem Renaissance. Equipped with this contact, Fannie began to contribute to the Organization of Business and Professional Women in Wilmington. She later volunteered herself as treasurer of the Wilmington Equal Suffrage Study Club, which organized Wilmington’s first big suffrage parade. After the Nineteenth Amendment to the United States Constitution was ratified, the group redefined themselves as the Colored Women’s Republican Committee. As a member, Fannie actively encouraged voter registration. She also gave her time to the Red Circle Community Association, which raised funds to improve African-American children’s playgrounds. Additionally, Fannie managed recreational programs and gave budgeting advice to people at the “Walnut Street Y”- an African-American branch of the YMCA. Fannie’s brother, John O. Hopkins, served on Wilmington’s City Council and often disputed racial segregation policies. He later founded a theatre to accommodate the black community, where Fannie helped organize events. Fannie Hopkins Hamilton died in 1964 and was married to George for 62 years.

== Early life ==
Fannie Hopkins Hamilton was born in 1882 in Queen’s Anne’s County, Maryland and moved to Wilmington, Delaware when she was eight with her widowed mother. Her father, Rev. Oliver Hopkins, died when she was young and he was a Minister of the African Methodist Episcopal Church. Her stepfather, Benjamin Briggs, was also a minister of the African Methodist Episcopal Church.

== Education ==
Fannie Hopkins Hamilton went to local public schools as a young girl in Wilmington, Delaware. During her years as a mother, Fannie was seeking an occupation as a seamstress and a dress maker, later traveling to Philadelphia to pursue advanced training at Drexel University. Soon, she developed her own shop. She also began teaching classes at Wilmington “colored” schools and encountered Alice Moore Dunbar, who was an African-American political activist and poet during the Harlem Renaissance. Equipped with this contact, Fannie began to contribute to the Organization of Business and Professional Women in Wilmington.

== Suffrage Work ==
Fannie Hopkins Hamilton worked with the Equal Suffrage Study Group, the Organization of Business and Professional Women, the Colored Women’s Republican Committee, Red Circle Community Association, and the “Walnut Street Y.” She courageously volunteered herself as the treasurer of the Equal Suffrage Study Group in 1914 in Wilmington, Delaware and played a major role in organizing Wilmington's first big suffrage parade. She represents an overlooked figure as an African-American suffragist, and also offers insight into how women encouraged others to become politically active after earning the right to vote. History often earmarks the 19th amendment as a significant gain for women, but little know about how half the population was activated to use this right. Although Fannie mainly improved her town of Wilmington, her work embodies the lives of many women who dedicated their time to upholding their communities.

== Uplifting the African-American community ==
After the 19th amendment was ratified, the group, Equal Suffrage Study Club, redefined themselves as the Colored Women’s Republican Committee. As a member, Fannie actively encouraged voter registration. She also gave her time to the Red Circle Community Association, which raised funds to improve African-American children’s playgrounds. Additionally, Fannie managed recreational programs and gave budgeting advice to people at the “Walnut Street Y”- an African-American branch of the YMCA.

== Personal life ==
Fannie was married to George W Hamilton for 62 years. They had two daughters together: Katherine Lorraine Hamilton and Elizabeth Anderson Parker. She had a granddaughter and three great-grandchildren as well.

== Final years ==
During her final years, Fannie continued to pursue her career as a dressmaker, businesswoman, suffragist, and civil rights activist. Once her health started to fail, she died at the age of 81 in 1964.

== Legacy ==
Her role in creating the Organization of Business and Professional Women in Wilmington lived on as well as her mentorship in teaching dressmaking at Wilmington schools. Fannie would donate her time to help families plan their wartime clothing budgets, work to provide foster homes and recreational programs for black children, and fund-raising for the Red Cross. A large portion of the community relied on Fannie’s business and economic skills.
