= Catherine Magdalen Thornton Boyle =

Catherine Boyle
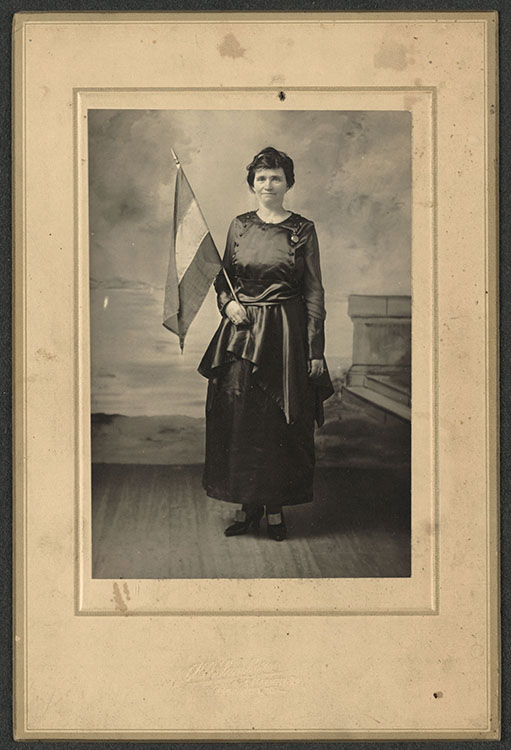
- Born: Catherine Magdalen Thornton; 1879; Delaware
- Died: 11 March 1955 (aged 75–76); Wilmington, Delaware
- Occupations: munitions worker, nurse

Catherine Magdalen Thornton Boyle (born 1879, died 1955), often shortened to Catherine Boyle, was an American suffragette and activist.

== Biography ==
Catherine was born Catherine Magdalen Thornton born in Delaware in 1879, the daughter of working class Irish immigrants. Much of her early life history is not recorded in sources, with most information on Boyle being gleaned from census records. In 1900 she married Thomas Boyle of New Castle, Delaware, who worked in a steel mill. The couple lived in Wilmington, Delaware for some years before permanently moving to New Castle.

In 1915, Catherine became involved with the Congressional Union for Woman Suffrage, a suffragist organization hoping to expand popular support for Women's Suffrage. The organization expanded its reach in Delaware, reaching a peak in 1918 and later becoming part of the National Woman's Party. Fueled by labor shortages and resultant boom in female employment during World War I, the NWP was able to garner significant popular support in northern Delaware. By 1918, records note that Boyle was working as a munitions worker at the Bethlehem Steel Company's plant in New Castle; while working at the plant, she was in frequent contact with militant suffragettes (including Florence Bayard Hilles) and became increasingly involved in the movement. In June 1918, she travelled to Washington, D.C., with a group of eight other suffragettes to petition the government for better working rights, pointing out the dangers of their work in the munitions plants. She returned to Washington in 1919, this time working to support a series of large-scale protests and picketing later referred to as the "Watchfire Protests". In the course of her protest actions, she was arrested and spent five days in prison, and upon her return to Wilmington she was named a guest of honor at a luncheon at the Hotel DuPont organized by the NWP.

Following the passing of the 19th Amendment in 1920, Boyle worked as a nurse. During parts of the 1918 flu pandemic, she opened her New Castle home to patients recovering from the virus. Boyle died on 11 March 1955 and is interred in St. Joseph's on the Brandywine cemetery in Wilmington.
