= Mary Winsor =

American suffragist

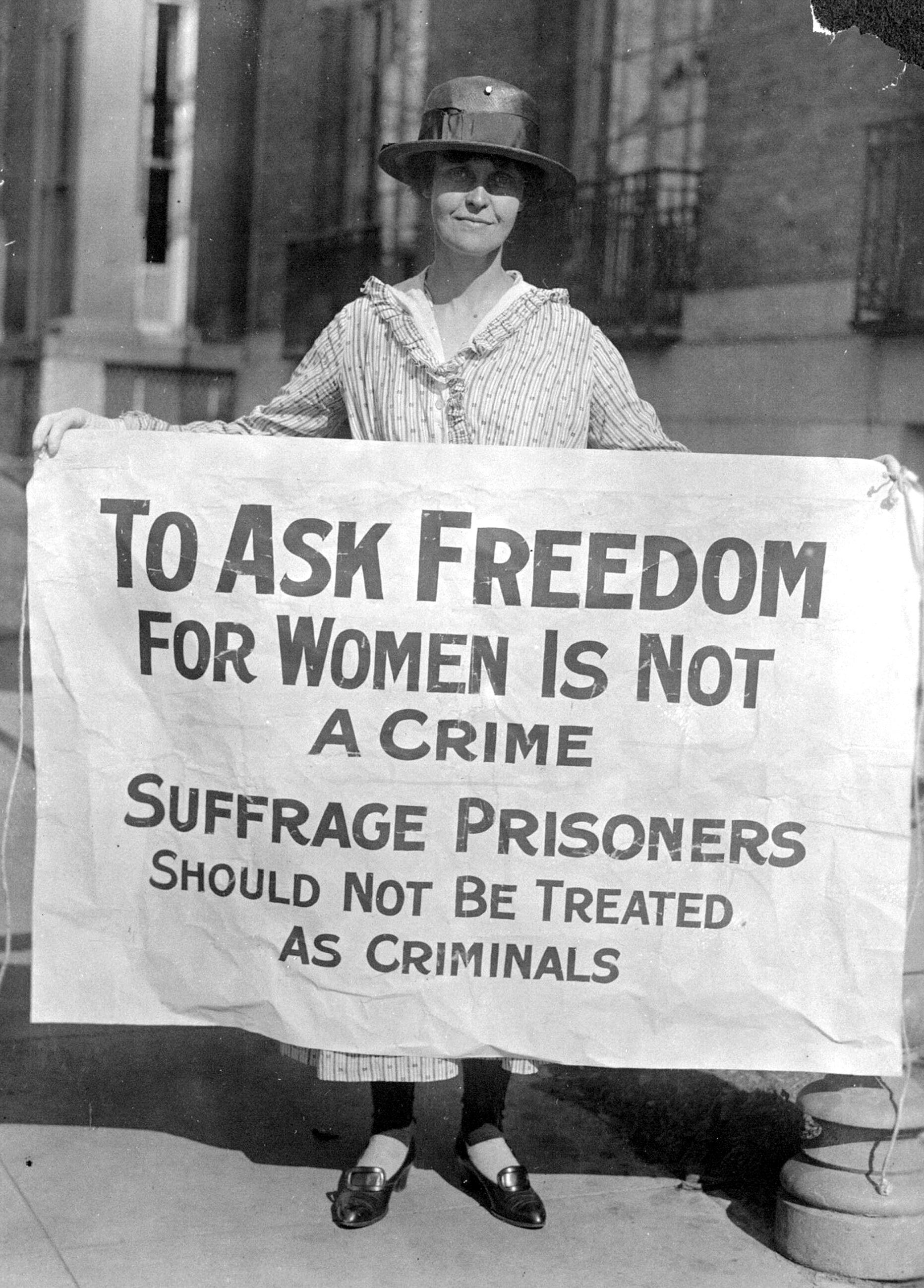
Mary Winsor in 1917

Mary Winsor (1869–1956) was an American suffragist. She was involved with the National Woman's Party, where she wrote for their organ Equal Rights Magazine, and was president of the Pennsylvania Limited Suffrage League from around 1909. Winsor was arrested several times in connection with her campaign for women's suffrage. She died in 1956.

== Early life ==
Winsor was born in Haverford, Pennsylvania in 1869, to a family descended from Quakers. Her mother was Rebecca C. Winsor, who was also a suffragist and Colonial Dame. She studied at the Drexel Institute and Bryn Mawr College.

== Activism ==
=== Limited Suffrage League ===
During her presidency of the Pennsylvania Limited Suffrage League, Winsor invited several notable feminists to give talks, including Emmeline Pankhurst, Charlotte Perkins Gilman, Alice Paul, and Katherine Houghton Hepburn.

=== Arrests ===
She was imprisoned several times. She became head of the Pennsylvania Limited Suffrage League in 1910. In 1917, she was sentenced to 60 days (thirteen of them in solitary confinement) at the Occoquan Workhouse in Lorton, Virginia, after being arrested on September 4 at the National Woman's Party Draftee Parade. On August 15, 1918, she was sentenced to ten days for "holding a meeting on public grounds", after being arrested on August 6 at the statue of the Marquis de Lafayette in Lafayette Square, Washington, D.C., near the White House.

One hundred women had gathered there carrying banners and the National Woman's Party purple, white and gold tri-color. The banners included: "How long must women wait for liberty?" and "We demand that the president and his party secure the passage of the suffrage amendment through the Senate in the present session." One woman was arrested as she began to speak: "We are here because when our country is at war for liberty and democracy ..." Another woman jumped onto the base of the statue and was arrested. A woman took her place and was arrested too. This continued until 47 women were in custody.

The first 18 women to stand trial pleaded not guilty. One of them, Hazel Hunkins, told the court: "Women cannot be law-breakers until they are law-makers." Inez Haynes Irwin wrote in 1921:

One of the witnesses was the Chief Clerk of Public Grounds, an elderly man. Elsie Hill suddenly asked him when he had taken office. He replied, "In 1878". "Do you realize", Miss Hill said, "that in that year a Federal Suffrage Amendment was introduced, and that since then women have been helping to pay your salary and that of other government officials under protest?" The Chief Clerk was so astounded that he merely shook his head.

The remaining women were tried on August 15 and refused to enter a plea or pay any attention in court. Alice Paul told the court: "As a disfranchised class we feel that we are not subject to the jurisdiction of this court and therefore refuse to take any part in its proceedings. We also feel that we have done nothing to justify our being brought before it." Irwin wrote: "They sat and read, or knitted, or, as the proceedings bored them, fell asleep." They were found guilty and fined five or ten dollars or ten or fifteen days in jail. They chose jail. Winsor told the court: "It is quite enough to pay taxes when you are not represented, let alone pay a fine if you object to this arrangement."

== Selected works ==
- Winsor, Mary (1913). A Suffrage Rummage Sale. Haverford P.O., Penn (privately printed).
- Winsor, Mary (1914). "The Militant Suffrage Movement", The Annals of the American Academy of Political and Social Science, 56, Women in Public Life, November, pp. 134–142. JSTOR 1011988

== See also ==
- List of suffragists and suffragettes

== Works cited ==
- Friedl, Bettina, ed. (1987). "The Plays". On to Victory: Propaganda Plays of the Woman Suffrage Movement. Boston: Northeastern University Press.
- Irwin, Inez Haynes (1921). The Story of the Woman's Party. New York: Harcourt, Brace and Company.
- "Mary Winsor", Turning Point Suffragist Memorial.
- Stevens, Doris (1920). Jailed for Freedom. New York: Boni and Liveright.
