= Senator Ginn =

Senator Ginn may refer to:

- David Ginn (born 1951), Louisiana State Senate
- Frank Ginn (born 1962), Georgia State Senate
