= Bessie Spence Dorrell =

- Born: Helen Elizabeth Spence; 1845; West Chester, Pennsylvania, US
- Died: April 11, 1945
- Occupation: Music teacher
- Organization: Equal Suffrage Study Club

Bessie Spence Dorrell (1875–1945) was an African American suffragist and music teacher. She was the founding secretary of the Wilmington Equal Suffrage Study Club (WESSC), an African American women's suffrage organization founded in Wilmington, Delaware in 1914.

== Activism ==
Spence Dorrell was known for her role as the founding secretary of the Wilmington Equal Suffrage Study Club (WESSC). The WESSC was founded "by and for African American women" to campaign for suffrage.
