= Sallie Topkis Ginns =

American suffragist

- Born: Sallie Topkis; May 9, 1880; Odessa, Russia
- Died: September 24, 1976 (aged 96); Wilmington, Delaware
- Occupations: Suffragist, Activist
- Spouse: James N. Ginns (m. 1899; died in 1959)

Sallie Topkis Ginns (May 9, 1880 – September 24, 1976) was a suffragist who served as treasurer of the National Woman's Party for eight years. She is an inductee in the Hall of Fame of Delaware Women.

== Early life ==
Ginns née Topkis was born on May 9, 1880, in Odessa, Russia, to a Jewish family. Her family emigrated to the United States in 1882.

== Career ==
Ginns was a social activist. Alongside Florence Bayard Hilles and Mabel Vernon, she picketed for women's right to vote at the United States Capitol and served as treasurer of the National Woman's Party.

After the 19th Amendment was ratified, Ginns became an active member of the Republican Party.

Ginns was founder and first president of the Wilmington chapter of the National Council of Jewish Women (NCJW) as well as participating in the formation of the Temple Beth Emeth also in Wilmington. As part of her work with the NCJW, Ginns worked to provide educational assistance and an Americanization program for immigrants.

Ginns was a member of Delaware Red Cross, receiving a Clara Barton Award.

== Personal life ==
In 1899, Ginns married James N. Ginns, a fruit peddler.

Ginns died on September 24, 1976, in Wilmington. The Jewish Federation of Delaware stated that she was "the most important Jewish woman In Delaware history."

=== Legacy ===
The Jewish Historical Society of Delaware is the repository of her papers. She was inducted into the Hall of Fame of Delaware Women in 1983.

== See also ==
- List of suffragists and suffragettes
