= Nellie B. Nicholson =

African-American suffragist and educator

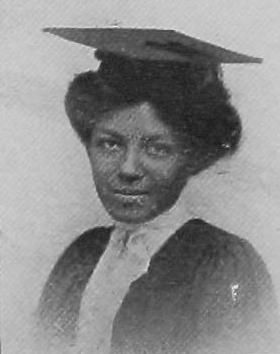
- Nicholson in 1911
- Born: July 22, 1888; Baltimore
- Died: December 20, 1965 (aged 77)
- Other names: Nellie Nicholson Taylor, Nellie Nicholson, Nellie Blythe Nicholson, Nellie B. Nicholson Taylor
- Spouse: William H. Taylor

Nellie Blythe Nicholson Taylor (July 22, 1888 – December 20, 1965) was an African-American suffragist and educator.[1]

Nicholson was a clubwoman, co-founding a local Delaware affiliate, the Women's College Club of Delaware, with Sadie L. Jones. She was a founding member of the Zeta Omega chapter of the Alpha Kappa Alpha sorority. She was also a founding member of the Equal Suffrage Study Club, founded in 1914. The group was organized to study and advocate for Black women's voting rights; they marched as a separate unit in Wilmington's first suffrage parade in 1914. After the passage of the Nineteenth Amendment, the group organized to encourage African-American women to register and vote. Members of the club assisted in supporting the founding of a Wilmington chapter of the NAACP in 1915 and Nicholson was the first press relations staffer.

== Personal life and education ==
Nicholson was born in Baltimore, Maryland on July 22, 1888, to George W. and Charlotte Nicholson. Her father served in the United States Colored Troops during the Civil War. Her mother was a skilled seamstress and dressmaker. Nicholson went to Baltimore Colored Training School for high school and Pembroke College in Brown University for college, receiving a Bachelor of Philosophy degree in 1911. After a few years teaching, she later attended the University of Pennsylvania and received a master's degree in Mathematics Education in 1931. She married William H. Taylor in 1928; he was a widower with three children. She is buried in Eden Cemetery in Collingdale, Pennsylvania.
