= The Sunday Morning Star =

Newspaper in Delaware, US

Sunday Morning Star
- Type: Weekly newspaper
- Format: Broadsheet
- Founded: March 6, 1881
- Ceased publication: April 18, 1954
- Language: American English
- OCLC number: 16074800
- Free online archives: Google News Archive

The Sunday Morning Star, also commonly known as The Sunday Star, was a weekly newspaper in Wilmington, Delaware from 1881 to 1954. It carried three official titles in its 74 years: The Sunday Morning Star from 1881 to 1949, The Sunday Star from 1949 to 1953, and the Wilmington Sunday Star from 1953 to 1954.

Although catering primarily to Wilmington's white community, The Sunday Morning Star played an important role in providing a column of news from and about the city's African American community, which filled the niche left vacant by Wilmington's frequent lack of an African-American newspaper.
