= Mary Ann Sorden Stuart =

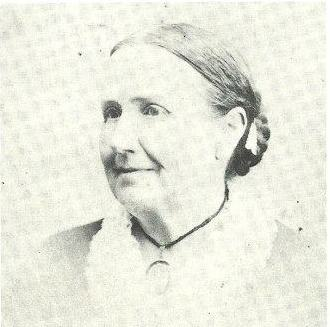
- Image of Mary Ann Sorden Stuart from Greenwood: A Delaware Town Printed By: Greenwood Bicentennial Committee
- Born: Mary Ann Sorden; February 12, 1828; Greenwood, Delaware, U.S.
- Died: April 19, 1893 (aged 65); Greenwood, Delaware, U.S.
- Resting place: St. Johnstown Methodist Church, Greenwood
- Known for: Women's suffrage; women's rights

Mary Ann Sorden Stuart (February 12, 1828 – April 19, 1893) was an American suffragist who served as a representative of the women's suffrage movement from Delaware and attended the National Woman Suffrage Association conventions in Washington, DC.

== Early life ==
Mary Ann Sorden Stuart was born on February 12, 1828, to John Sorden and Sarah Owens Pennewill Sorden in Sussex County, Delaware.

== Activism ==
Stuart organized the first women's suffrage group in Wilmington, Delaware, in 1869. Stuart spoke in favor of women's suffrage in front of the United States Senate Judiciary Committee in 1878. She also became the Delaware representative to the National Woman Suffrage Association (NWSA). Stuart also testified to the Delaware General Assembly in 1881 on allowing women's suffrage in the state constitution.
