= Alice Gertrude Baldwin =

African-American suffragist

- Born: 1859; Baltimore, Maryland, U.S.
- Died: 1943 (aged 83–84)
- Education: New York University
- Occupation: Suffragist
- Relatives: Maria Louise Baldwin (sister)

Alice Gertrude Baldwin (1859 – 1943) was an African-American suffragist.

== Family life ==
Alice Gertrude Baldwin was born in Baltimore, Maryland, in 1859 to Mary E. Baldwin and Peter L. Baldwin. She was the second of three children, with one older sister, Maria Louise Baldwin, and one younger brother, Louis F. Baldwin. Miss Baldwin was born in Baltimore, Md., and was educated in Cambridge, Mass., after which she took special courses at several universities. months illness. She retired in 1933 after having been a principal of the Normal Training School, in the old Howard High School. She had been a member of First Unitarian Church here since 1898 and was active in the National Association for the Advancement of Colored People and the Inter-racial Committee of the Branch Y. W. C. A.

== Education and career ==
She grew up in Cambridge, Massachusetts, and attended New York University after attending teacher's college.

== Suffrage work ==
The Wilmington Equal Suffrage Club was formed March 19, 1914, and Alice Gertrude Baldwin was a member. She was a champion of woman suffrage and racial equality and worked for women's suffrage through the ratification of the Nineteenth Amendment.
