= Annie Arniel =

American suffragist

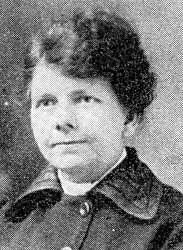
- Annie Arniel
- Born: Anna L. Melvin; May 1873; Harrington, Delaware
- Died: February 9, 1924 (aged 50–51)
- Occupation: Suffragist
- Spouse: George Arniel

Annie Arniel (May 1873 – February 9, 1924) was a suffragist and women's rights advocate. Born in Harrington, Delaware as Anna L. Melvin, she married George Arniel of Canada and was widowed in 1910. Annie played a key role in helping to win the women's vote in the United States.

== Activism ==
Arniel was a factory worker, living in downtown Wilmington, Delaware, when she was recruited by Mabel Vernon and Alice Paul for membership in the National Woman's Party (NWP). As a member of the Silent Sentinels she was among the first six suffragists arrested and jailed on June 27, 1917, at the White House. She served eight jail terms for suffrage protesting: three days in June 1917; 60 days in the Occoquan prison in Virginia, from August to September 1917, for picketing; 15 days for a meeting in Lafayette Square; and five sentences of five days each in January and February 1919 for the NWP's watchfire demonstrations.

After participating in a demonstration at the United States Capitol in October 1919, Arniel was "so brutally treated by the police that she was rendered unconscious and her back was injured. She was taken to a hospital, and the police gave out that she was "roughed up a bit" when her banner was seized. At the hospital police told attendants that she had been injured in a street car accident."

== Death ==
According to Arniel's Delaware Death Record, she died on February 9, 1924, at the age of 55. The cause of death was "asphyxiated by illuminating gas; suicide intent."

== See also ==
- List of suffragists and suffragettes
- Timeline of women's suffrage
