= Blanche Williams Stubbs =

American civil rights activist and suffragist

- Born: Blanche Williams; 1872
- Died: 1952 (aged 79–80)
- Education: Howard University
- Occupations: Activist, suffragist
- Spouse: J. Bacon Stubbs

Blanche Williams Stubbs (1872 – 1952) was an American civil rights activist and suffragist. Due to her role as a prominent activist in Wilmington, Delaware, she was inducted into the Hall of Fame of Delaware Women in 2019.

== Career and activism ==
Blanche Williams was a teacher at The Howard School in Wilmington, Delaware. Williams was likely recruited by the high school's principal, Edwina Kruse. She moved to the area after having graduated from Howard University in 1892.

In addition to her work as a teacher, Blanche was active in her community and has been described as a "dedicated club woman". She assisted in founding the Equal Suffrage Study Club, an African-American women's suffrage organisation, and actively campaigned for women's suffrage in Delaware, supporting the overturning of the State of Delaware's segregation laws. As well as her role in the ESSC, Stubbs served as the chairwoman for the Delaware chapter of the National Republican Women's Auxiliary Committee and was a member of the National Association of Colored Women.

She also assisted in founding the Garrett Settlement House, a black orphanage and community center named after abolitionist Thomas Garrett where Wilmington's African American Suffrage Club met between 1914 and 1920. One of the events hosted there by the African American Suffrage Club was mentioned in an article in The Evening Journal, which states that Stubbs (referred to as Mrs. J. B. Stubbs) was presiding over the meeting, along with Mrs. Annie M Arnell.

== Personal life ==
Blanche Williams was born in Wisconsin in February 1872. She was the daughter of a successful barber, and Blanche moved with her family as they relocated to Philadelphia in 1900. Possibly inspired by her father's profession and her siblings (several of whom went on to work in the medical field), Blanche attended Howard University, graduating in 1892, and later moved to Wilmington, Delaware, to teach at a local high school. While in Wilmington she married Dr. J. Bacon Stubbs, a fellow Howard alumnus.

Stubbs died in Wilmington in 1952. In 2019, Blanche Williams Stubbs was inducted into the Hall of Fame of Delaware Women by Delaware Governor John Carney in recognition of her activism.
