= Florence Bayard Hilles =

American suffragist (1865–1954)

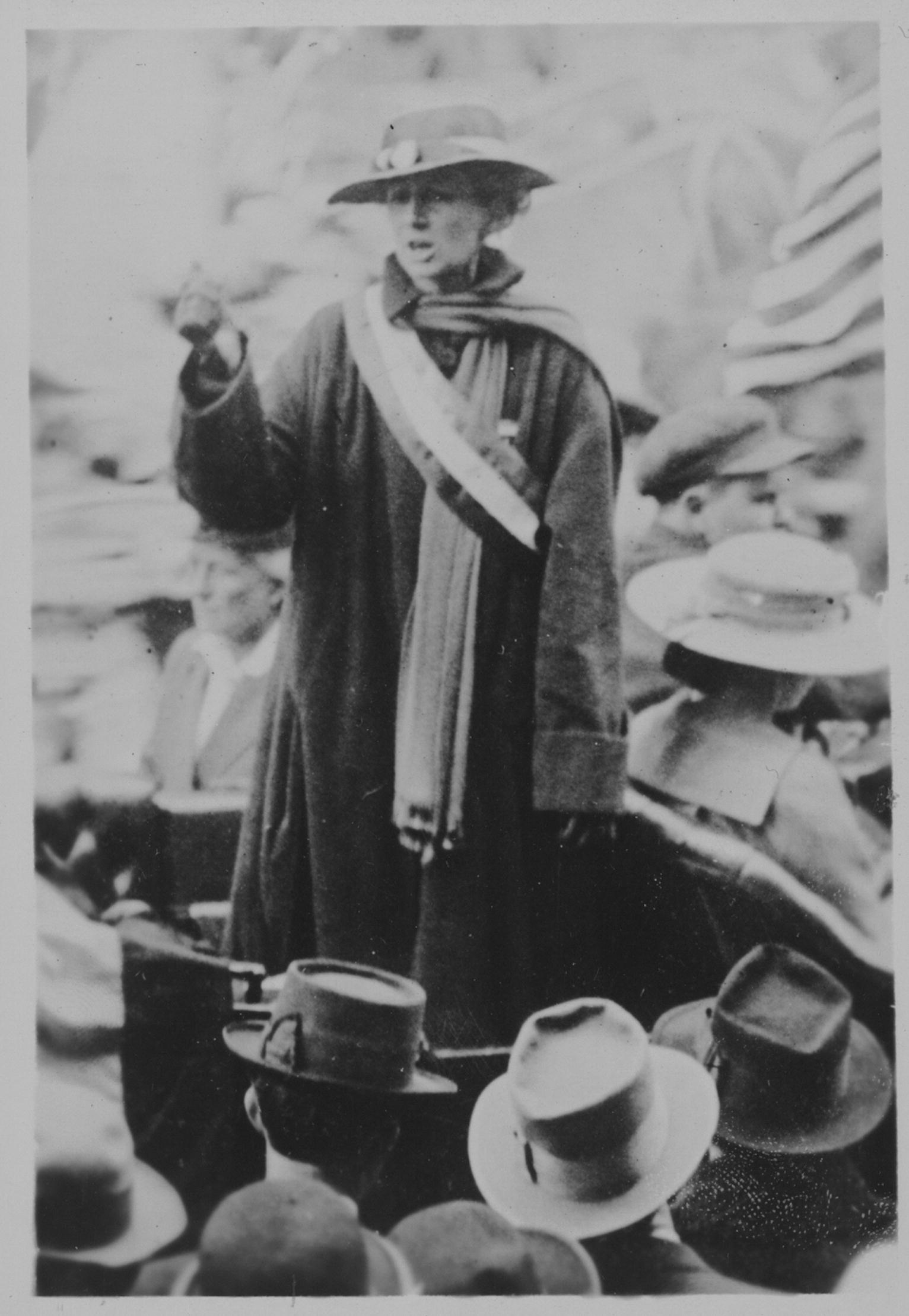
- Hilles, ca. 1916
- Born: Florence Bayard; October 27, 1865; Delaware, U.S.
- Died: June 10, 1954 (aged 88); Philadelphia, Pennsylvania, U.S.
- Resting place: Old Swedes Church; Wilmington, Delaware, U.S.
- Monuments: Florence Bayard Hilles Research Library; Belmont–Paul Women's Equality National Monument
- Organization: Founder of National Woman's Party
- Title: Chair of the National Womans Party
- Term: 1933–1936
- Political party: Democratic
- Movement: Women's suffrage
- Spouse: William S. Hilles
- Father: Thomas F. Bayard

Florence Bayard Hilles (1865–1954) was an American suffragist and a member of the prominent Bayard family. She was one of the founders of the National Woman's Party.

== Biography ==
Florence Bayard was born on October 17, 1865, in Delaware to Thomas Francis Bayard and Louise Lee. Part of the Bayard family, her father served as a United States senator from Delaware as well as the 30th secretary of state in the Grover Cleveland administration, and ambassador to the United Kingdom.

She was a munitions worker in World War I, and worked for a time in France following the war's end. After hearing Mabel Vernon speak at the Delaware State Fair in 1913, she joined the suffrage movement. In 1914, Hilles was voted to be the head of the Delaware Congressional Union for Woman Suffrage chapter. During her presidency, division between the Congressional Union and the Delaware Equal Suffrage Association emerged. That year she organized the first parade advocating for women's suffrage in Delaware. Held on May 2 in Wilmington, in conjunction with other parades across the nation, it had over 400 attendees.

On a 1916 suffrage tour, she was the principal speaker, and in Seattle scattered flyers from a seaplane. In 1917, she was elected to the national board of the National Woman's party. Hilles served as a Silent Sentinel, picketing the White House, leading women in a "Grand Picket" on March 4, 1917. She was the chairwoman of the Delaware branch of the National Woman's Party.

The White House picket continued into July. Sixteen women, including Hilles, Annie Arniel, and Dora Lewis, were arrested on July 14, 1917 and sent to Occoquan Virginia Workhouse.

In 1919, she was prominent at the "Watchfire demonstrations". An advocate of the Equal Rights Amendment, she was viewed as one of the most prominent supporters of the amendment. From 1933 to 1936, she served as the national chairman of the National Woman's Party.

== Personal life and legacy ==
She married William S. Hilles, a lawyer. Her brother, Thomas Francis Bayard, Jr., was a U.S. Senator like their father, and advocate against women's suffrage.

The Florence Bayard Hilles Research Library in the Belmont–Paul Women's Equality National Monument was established by Hilles and memorialized in her name after her death in 1954. The library is the oldest Feminist library in the United States.

In Votes for Delaware Women, scholar Anne M. Boylan describes Hilles as "perhaps the most visible of Delaware's" militant suffragettes.
