= Caroline Katzenstein =

American suffragist

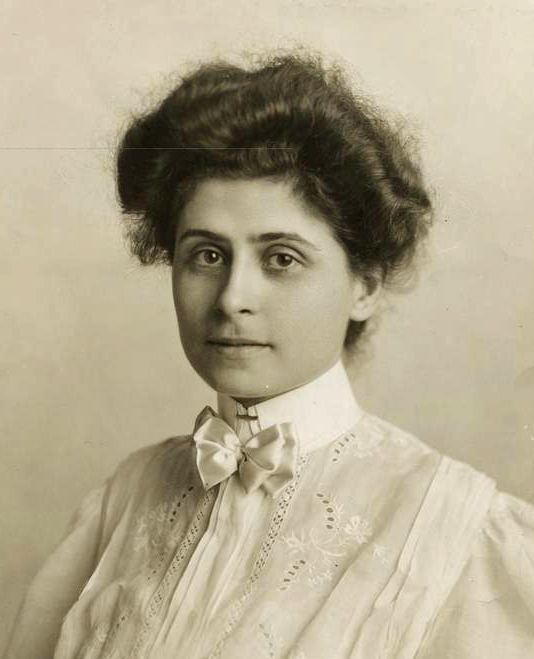
- Katzenstein, 1911
- Born: 1888; Warrenton, North Carolina
- Died: January 31, 1968 (aged 80); Philadelphia, Pennsylvania
- Occupations: Writer, suffragist
- Notable work: Lifting the Curtain: the State and National Woman Suffrage Campaigns in Pennsylvania as I Saw Them

Caroline Katzenstein (1888 – January 31, 1968) was an American suffragist, activist, advocate for equal rights, insurance agent, and author. She was active in the local Philadelphia suffragist movement through the Pennsylvania branch of the National American Woman Suffrage Association and the Equal Franchise Society of Philadelphia. She played a role in the formation of the Congressional Union for Women Suffrage, which later became the National Women's Party. Katzenstein was also active in the movement for equal rights, serving on the Women's Joint Legislative Committee with Alice Paul, and championing the cause for the Equal Rights Amendment. She was the author of Lifting the Curtain: the State and National Woman Suffrage Campaigns in Pennsylvania as I Saw Them (1955).

== Early life and education ==
Caroline Katzenstein was born in 1888 in Warrenton, North Carolina. Her parents were Mr. and Mrs. Emil Katzenstein. In 1907, following the death of her father, Caroline's family moved to Philadelphia. She lived in the Philadelphia neighborhood of Powelton Village.

== Activism ==
=== Women's right to vote ===
Katzenstein became involved in the fight for women's suffrage in Philadelphia. In 1910, at the age of 22, Katzenstein began her first official role with the Women's Suffrage Movement in the United States, working as secretary for the Pennsylvania Woman Suffrage Association (the Pennsylvania branch of National American Woman Suffrage Association, or NAWSA) and the Women Suffrage Society of Philadelphia, whose joint headquarters were located in Philadelphia until 1912 when they were relocated to Harrisburg; the Philadelphia office was renamed the Headquarters of the Eastern District of Pennsylvania. The Equal Franchise Society of Philadelphia established its headquarters in the same Philadelphia building soon thereafter. The following year, in 1911, Katzenstein was asked to join the National American Woman Suffrage Association committee, on which she served for two years.

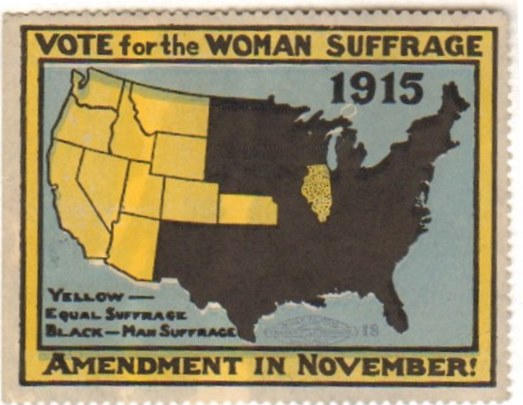
Poster stamp designed by Caroline Katzenstein for national distribution to encourage voting for the Woman Suffrage Amendment in November 1915

In 1913, the suffragette Alice Paul began campaigning in Philadelphia, believing that: "Given Philadelphia’s historical significance as the nation’s birthplace ... protesting for women’s rights in Philadelphia was an important symbolic gesture for the movement." Katzenstein supported Paul's militant and often radical techniques for protest, and during one of Paul's speeches on Kensington Avenue, Katzenstein handed out supporting pamphlets. Paul's methods were viewed as too militant for the NAWSA and as a result, Paul and her supporters – including Katzenstein – formed the Congressional Union for Woman Suffrage, later renamed the National Women's Party (NWP). One of the major differences in approach between the two major organizations was that the former (NAWSA and its affiliates) believed that women's right to vote should be granted at a state-wide level, whereas the latter (the group that would later become the NWP) advocated for a constitutional amendment.

Initially, Katzenstein remained loyal to both the NAWSA and the newly formed Congressional Union for Woman Suffrage, but tensions throughout the former organization forced Katzenstein to resign from her position as secretary for the Philadelphia branch of NAWSA in 1914. In the same year, the Equal Franchise Society of Philadelphia opened new headquarters and recruited Katzenstein as its publicist and secretary. While there, Katzenstein designed a poster stamp with a map showing suffrage and non-suffrage states, for state and national distribution to promote the referendum. She served as executive secretary until early 1916, leaving shortly after the Philadelphia suffrage referendum was rejected. She concluded that state-wide amendments would not effect significant change.

In the spring of 1916, Katzenstein began a position as the executive secretary and chair of publicity for the Congressional Union of Pennsylvania (the Pennsylvania branch of the Congressional Union for Woman Suffrage).

=== The "Suffrage Special" ===
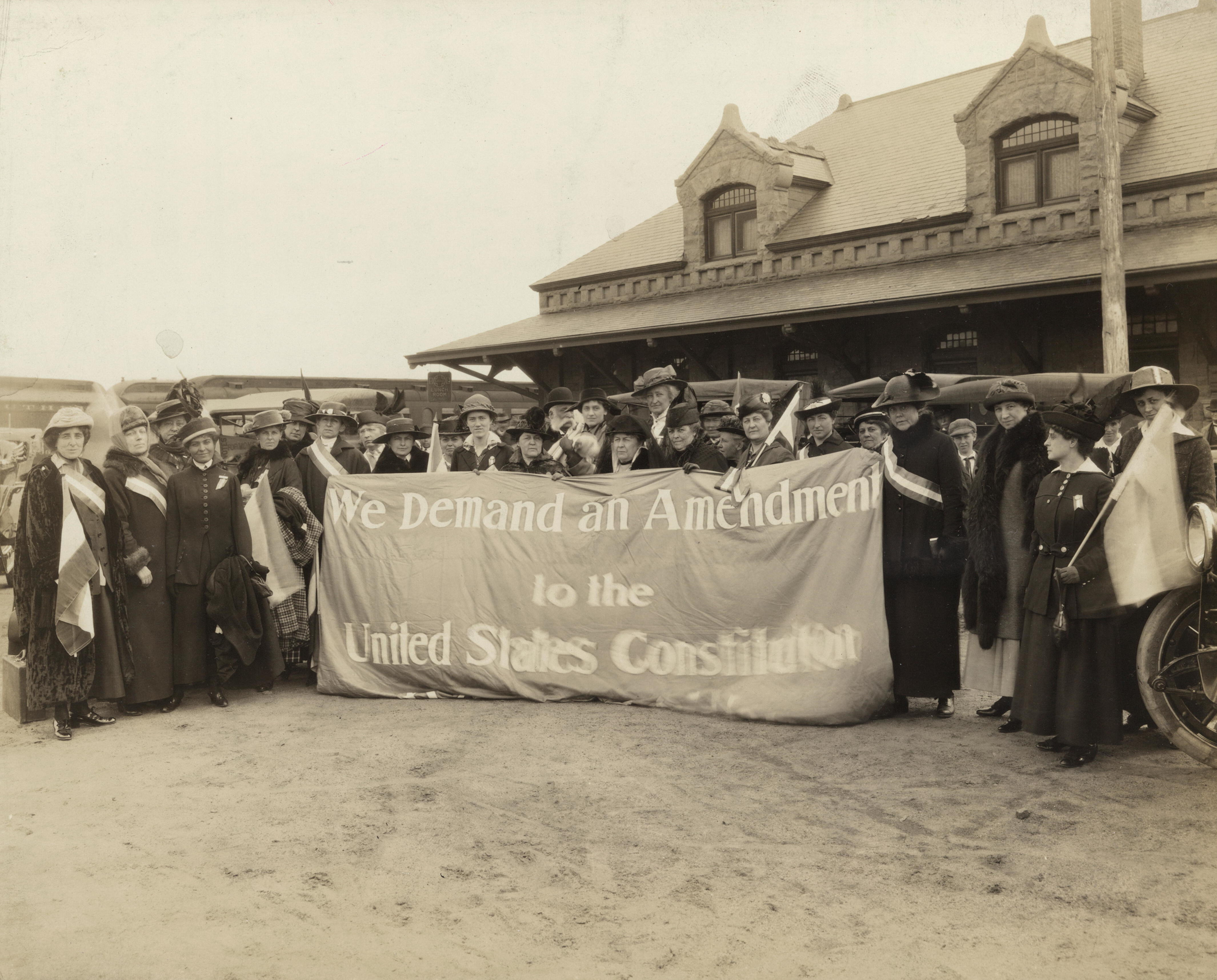
"Suffrage Special": Arrival of the "Flying Squadron" at Colorado Springs, Colorado

On April 9, 1916, Katzenstein and twenty-two other women embarked upon a train journey from Washington, D.C., to the western United States as representatives for the Congressional Union; the purpose of this trip was to garner support from enfranchised women in western states and to recruit attendees to a conference in Chicago. The women were on the road for 5 weeks and stopped in Illinois, Kansas, Colorado, Arizona, California, Oregon, Washington, Montana, Idaho, Utah, Colorado, and Missouri prior to their return to DC on May 16. In addition to Katzenstein, the following women were a part of this tour: Lillian Ascough, Abby Scott Baker, Harriot Stanton Blatch, Lucy Burns, Agnes Campbell, Anna Constable, Sarah T. Colvin, Edith Goode, Jane Goode, Florence Bayard Hilles, Julia Hurlbut, Winifred Mallon, Dorothy Mead, Agnes Morey, Katherine Morey, Gertrude B. Newell, Mrs. Percy Read, Ella Riegel, Elizabeth Rogers, Mrs. Townsend Scott, Helen Todd, and Margaret Whittemore. The "Suffrage Special" was successful, and the National Women's Party was formed in Chicago that June.

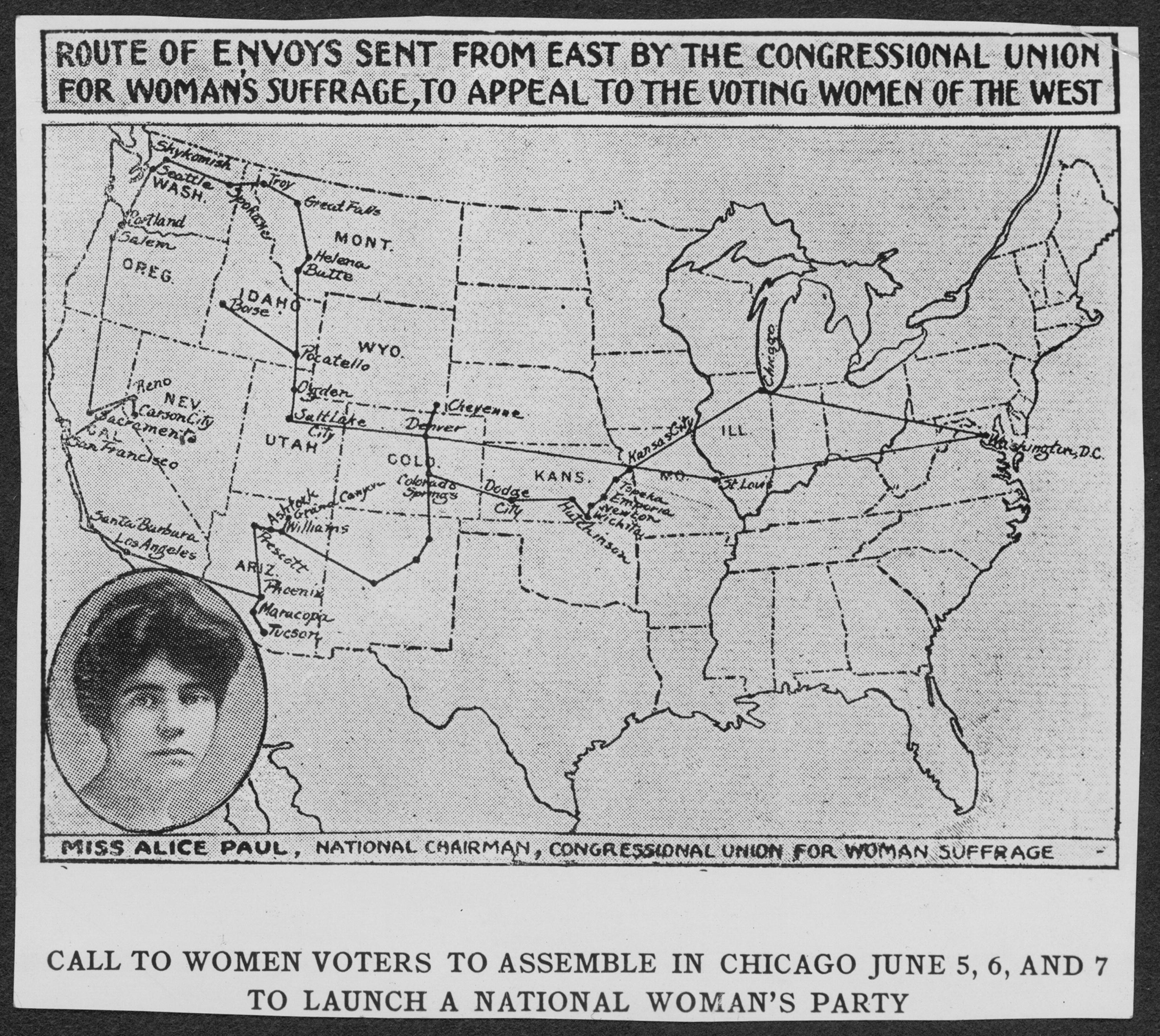
Map of Route of Envoys Sent from East by the Congressional Union for Woman's Suffrage, to Appeal the Voting Women of the West with inset portrait of Alice Paul

Katzenstein remained active in the Philadelphia suffrage movement when the Nineteenth Amendment to the United States Constitution was ratified on August 26, 1920.

=== Equal rights for women ===
Katzenstein was still involved with the NWP following the ratification of the Nineteenth Amendment, and when the Women Teachers Organization of Philadelphia approached the party for aid in their fight for equal pay, she offered to help publicize their efforts. The Woodruff and Finegan bills were passed in the early 1920s, ensuring pay parity between male and female teachers in Philadelphia. This victory launched Katzenstein into the campaign for equal rights nationwide, in particular the Equal Rights Amendment (ERA). As a representative of the World Woman’s Party, Katzenstein served on the Women’s Joint Legislative Committee with Alice Paul in 1943. During the 1950s Katzenstein poured her energy into writing, both formally and informally: in 1955 she published her first and only book, Lifting the Curtain: the State and National Woman Suffrage Campaigns in Pennsylvania as I Saw Them (1955), in which Alice Paul wrote the preface. Katzenstein also wrote essays and articles under the pseudonym Carol Stone. At the same time, she wrote to leading politicians, including Presidents Dwight D. Eisenhower, Harry S. Truman, and Richard M. Nixon, and Senators Robert Taft, John F. Kennedy, and Joseph Sill Clark, encouraging them to support the ERA.

Despite the efforts of Katzenstein and other champions for women's rights, the ERA was not passed in the House and Senate until 1971, three years after Katzenstein's death. The amendment is still not ratified today.

== Later career ==
Following the success of the suffrage movement, Katzenstein had a long and successful career as an insurance agent at various companies in Philadelphia, including: The Equitable Life Insurance Society of New York, the Philadelphia branch of the Massachusetts Bonding and Insurance Company, and the Philadelphia Life Insurance Company. In November 1922 she received recognition as the first woman in the Philadelphia Life Insurance Company to win the “Leader of Leaders” award for the most business in the previous month.

== Final years and death ==
A longtime resident of Powelton Avenue in Philadelphia, Caroline Katzenstein spent her final days at the Regina Nursing Center, 230 North 65th Street in Philadelphia. She died there on January 31, 1968, at the age of 80.
