= Lillian Ascough =

American suffragist (1880–1974)

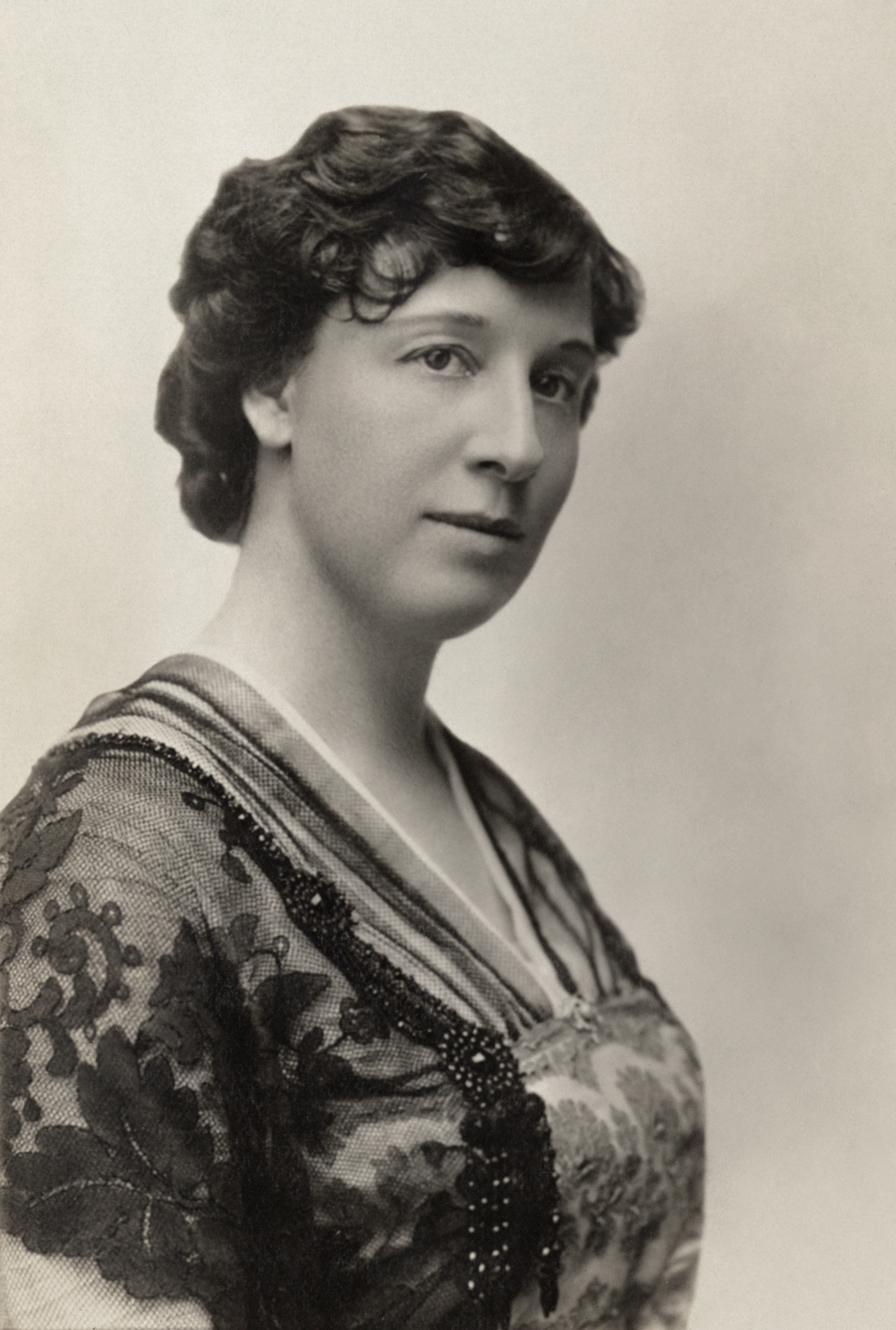
- Ascough in 1915
- Born: May 14, 1880; New York City, U.S.
- Died: December 1974 (aged 94); New Castle, Delaware, U.S.
- Occupation: Suffragist

Lillian Ascough (May 14, 1880 – December 1974) was an American suffragist. Originally from Detroit, Michigan, she served as the Connecticut chair of the National Woman's Party (NWP) and as the vice president of the Michigan branch of the NWP. At the August 1918 demonstration at Lafayette Square, Ascough was sentenced to fifteen days in jail. Then, in February 1919 she participated in the watchfire demonstrations and was again arrested and sentenced to five days in jail. She was a speaker in the Prison Special tour (so named due to the speakers voicing their experiences as political prisoners) of the U.S. during February and March 1919.

== Education ==
Ascough studied in Paris and London for stage concerts but left her education in order to become a suffragist.

== Suffrage Special ==
Ascough joined fellow suffragists Abby Scott Baker, Harriot Stanton Blatch, Lucy Burns, Agnes Campbell, Anna Constable, Sarah T. Colvin, Edith Goode, Jane Goode, Florence Bayard Hilles, Julia Hurlbut, Caroline Katzenstein, Dorothy Mead, Ella Riegel, Elizabeth Rogers, Townsend Scott, Helen Todd, and Marjory Whittemore on the Suffrage Special tour, during which the women spoke publicly, distributed literature, and sold copies of The Suffragist. This tour is credited with arousing interest in federal suffrage among many voting-age women.

== July 12 Connecticut rally ==
Ascough joined a rally in Hartford and Simsbury, Connecticut to appeal to President Woodrow Wilson to grant women the right to vote. A telegram written by the protestors was sent to Wilson, and published on July 13, 1918, in the Hartford Courant:

Resolved, That we citizens of Connecticut, assembled in meeting in Simsbury, Conn., do petition the President to use his undoubted power on behalf of the women, as he has already used it on behalf of many measures, to bring about the passage by the Senate, of the federal suffrage amendment; and thus to give liberty to the magnificent democratic sentiments he has expressed as spokesman of America, and uphold the great principles of democracy as a leader among nations.

— Protestors, ConnecticutHistory.Org

There Ascough was documented declaring that Senator Brandegee's mind belonged to an earlier generation and compared it to an antique, "interesting to observe, but not for present day use."
