= Prison Special =

1919 train tour organized by suffragists

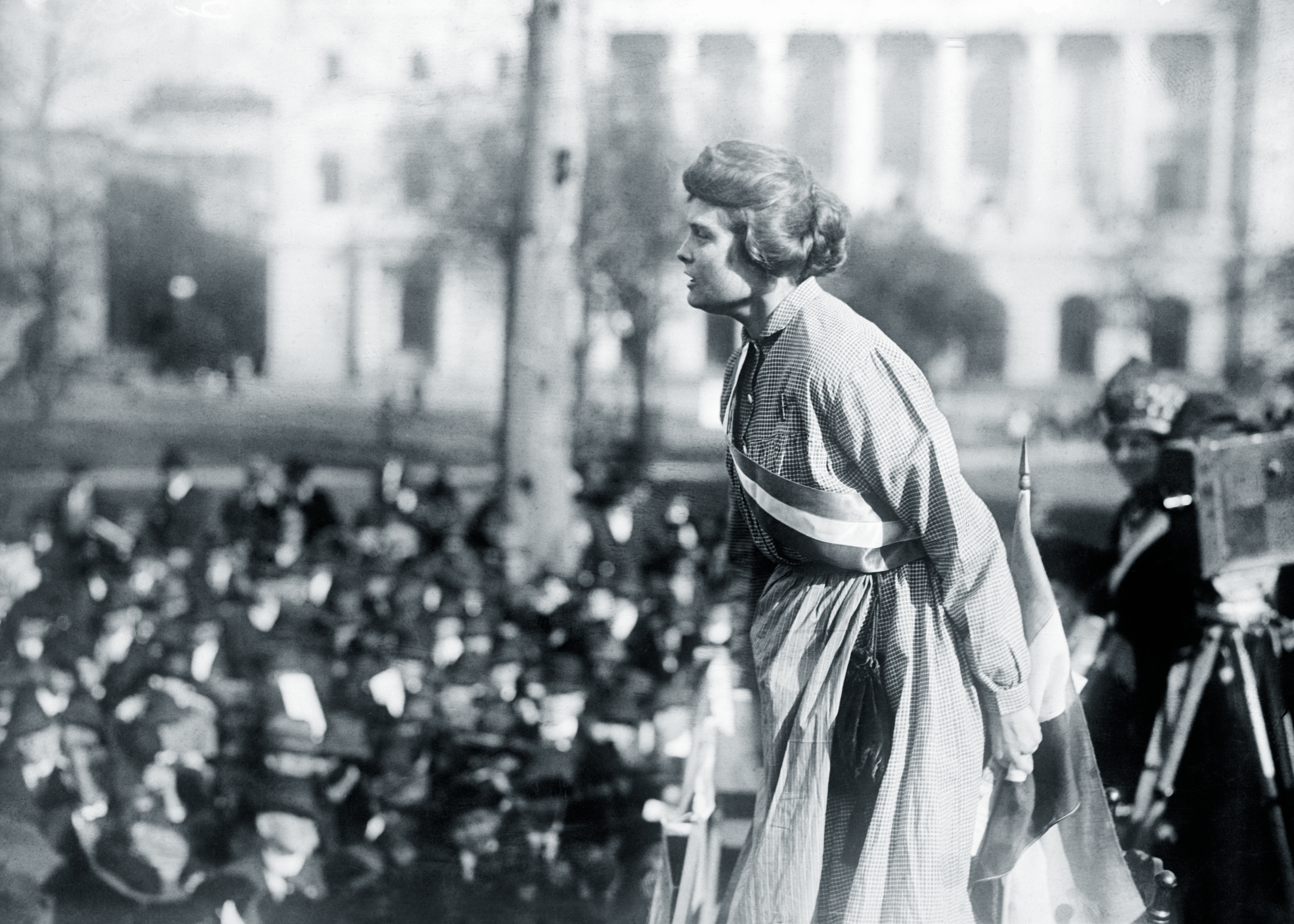
Lucy Branham, in prison dress, speaking on the Prison Special tour

The "Prison Special" was a train tour organized by suffragists who, as members of the Silent Sentinels and other demonstrations, had been jailed for picketing the White House in support of passage of the federal women's suffrage amendment. In February 1919, 26 members of the National Woman's Party boarded a chartered train they dubbed the "Democracy Limited" in Washington, D.C. They visited cities across the country where they spoke to large crowds about their experiences as political prisoners at Occoquan Workhouse, and were typically dressed in their prison uniforms. The tour, which concluded in March 1919, helped create support for the ratification effort that ended with the adoption of the Nineteenth Amendment on August 26, 1920.

== Background ==
In the summer of 1917, members of the National Woman's Party (NWP) began to stage protests outside the White House in Washington, D.C., demanding the vote for women. Over the course of the summer and fall, many of the women were arrested, often on charges of obstructing traffic, and fined. When they refused to pay those fines, they were jailed. At first, penalties were relatively light, but as the Silent Sentinels persisted in their vigil, sentences became more harsh. In July and August of that year, women were sentenced to unusually harsh sentences of sixty days and many were imprisoned at Occoquan Workhouse in Virginia. In their belief that they were political prisoners, they refused to eat prison food, to perform work, or to wear the rough-cut prison uniforms provided to prisoners. By the fall, three of the women who had been participating in a hunger strike were subjected to forced feedings.

Public pressure forced officials to release the women held at Occoquan, but arrests continued throughout 1918 as the NWP intensified its lobbying efforts on behalf of women's suffrage. At the beginning of 1919, members of the NWP lit watch fires at both the White House and in nearby Lafayette Park, prompting another wave of arrests. Ultimately, 168 women would serve prison time. In February 1919, the woman's suffrage amendment was defeated by just one vote in the Senate. To secure public support and pressure legislators into passing the amendment before the end of the congressional session in March, the NWP launched a campaign they dubbed "From Prison to People," a three-week train tour across the United States.

== The tour ==
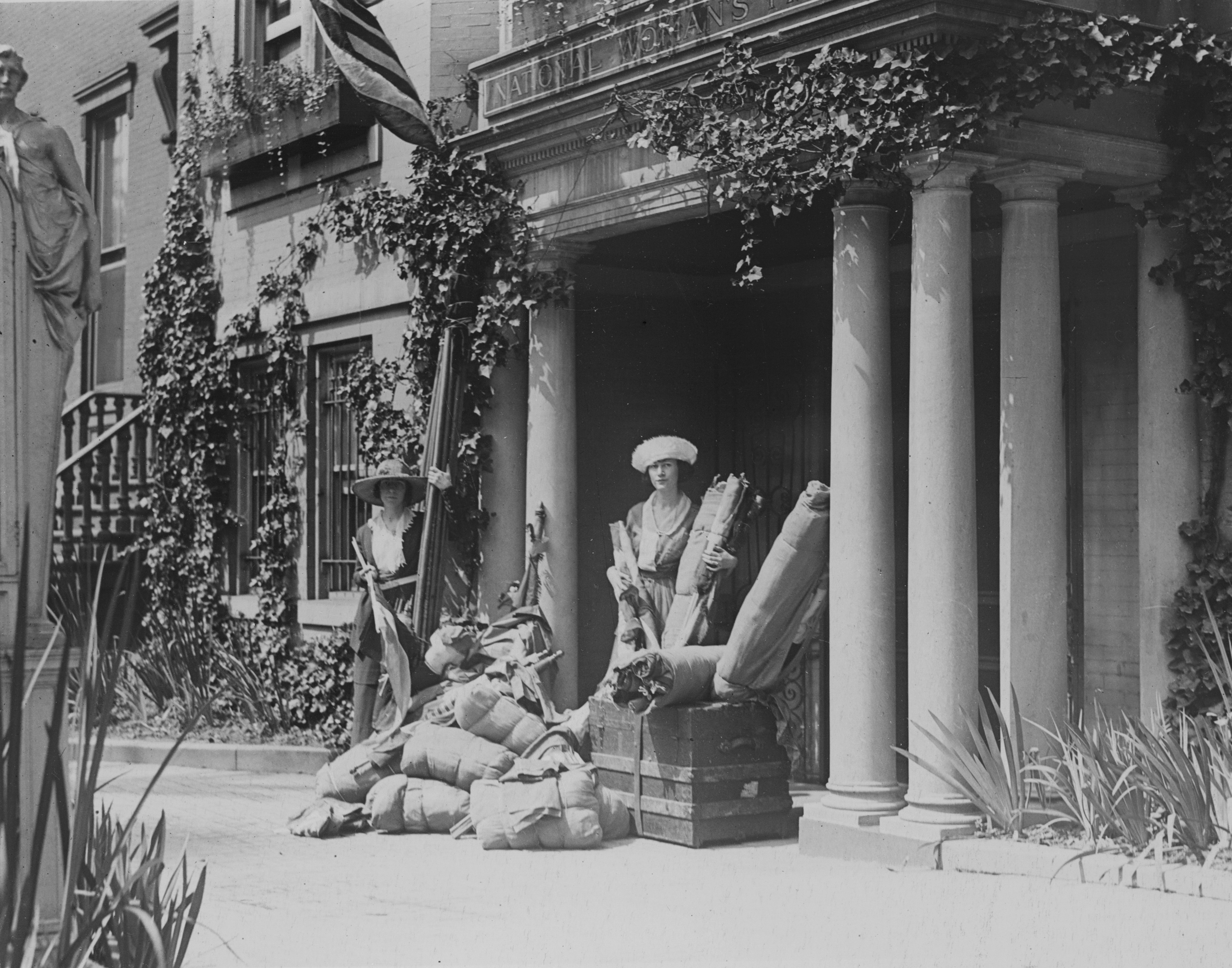
Two National Woman's Party members standing with luggage and supplies for the "Prison Special" tour, in front of the NWP headquarters in Washington, D.C.

Designed to educate the public about the "brutal and lawless measures of the Administration to suppress suffrage," the "Prison Special" train tour stopped at 16 cities across the United States to highlight the arrest, incarceration, and ill-treatment of women who had participated in protests supporting women's suffrage. The NWP members aboard the chartered train (nicknamed "The Democracy Limited") included veteran organizers Abby Scott Baker, Lucy Gwynne Branham, Lucy Burns, Mary Nolan (the NWP's "oldest picket"), Vida Milholland, Agnes Morey and Mabel Vernon.

To make their argument, they gave speeches from rented halls, train platforms, and automobiles, they sang jail songs from their time in prison, including "The Women's Marseillaise", and played the comb, they reenacted their arrests through dramatic readings, and they distributed pamphlets, including "Jailed for Freedom" (not to be confused with Doris Stevens' work published in 1920 under the same title). Perhaps most significantly, they dressed in replicas of their prison uniforms—described in the NWP publication, The Suffragist, as "calico wrappers designed exactly after the pattern of those which they were forced to wear in the work-house, thereby making the accounts of their experiences in the jail more vivid."

The tour was expensive and the cost—about $20,000—was funded by state branches of the NWP and individual donations from members. Louisine Havemeyer, a wealthy New York socialite and suffragist, also donated $1500 to the cause. William B. Thompson, a businessman, philanthropist, and supporter of women's suffrage, paid for the literature distributed during the tour. Ella Riegel managed tour logistics and Abby Scott Baker served as publicist.

=== Itinerary ===
The Prison Special left Union Station in Washington, D.C., on February 15, 1919, the anniversary of the birthday of women's rights activist Susan B. Anthony. The published itinerary included stops in the following cities:

- Charleston, South Carolina (February 16–17)
- Jacksonville, Florida (February 18–19)
- Chattanooga, Tennessee (February 20–21)
- New Orleans, Louisiana (February 22–23)
- San Antonio, Texas (February 24)
- Los Angeles, California (February 26–27)
- San Francisco, California (February 28-March 1)
- Denver, Colorado (March 3–4)
- Chicago, Illinois (March 5–7)
- Milwaukee, Wisconsin (March 6)
- Detroit, Michigan (March 7)
- Syracuse, New York (March 8–9)
- Boston, Massachusetts (March 9–10)
- Hartford, Connecticut (March 10)
- New York, New York (March 10)

The route moved systematically through the Southern states, where the NWP hoped to sway the sentiment of the Democratic Party, which had resisted the cause of women's suffrage, on to the Western states, where the NWP expected to rally women already enfranchised by their states to the cause of a federal amendment, and through the Northern states and the Northeast, ending in New York City. In addition to its published itinerary, the Prison Special also made several unscheduled stops which the women took full advantage of. In El Paso, Texas, a "flat wheel" on the Prison Special car forced an overnight stay. The El Paso Herald reports that Lucy Burns, Amelia Himes Walker Elizabeth McShane, and Sue Shelton White "preached the doctrine of suffrage" while other suffragists distributed literature to the gathered crowd. They carried flags with the suffrage colors of gold, purple, and white and stood on a step so that they could speak through the train platform's grill, which mimicked the bars of a prison. In an interview with the newspaper, Abby Scott Baker provided some insight into the women's experience as public speakers: "It is not easy to begin speaking on the street", she said. "Even though you are in the midst of a crowd, you have to begin talking to the air. But when you start out 'Ladies and gentlemen, the cause of liberty is sacred,' some of them will stop to see what is going on and, if you keep on, you will get them interested".

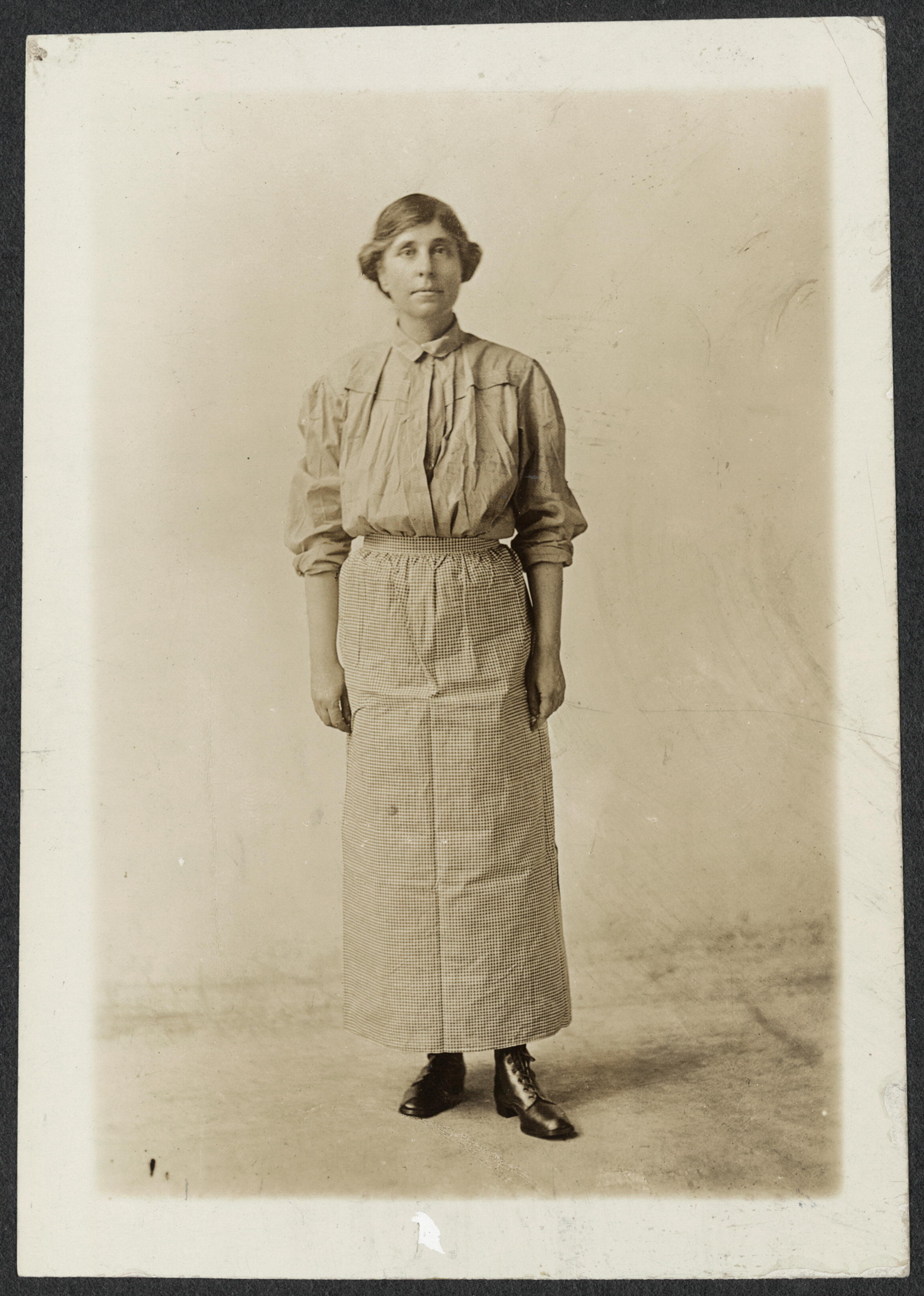
Abby Scott Baker in prison dress

The participants of the Prison Special tour, all women who had served time in jail for supporting suffrage, included:

- Pauline Adams
- Edith Ainge
- Berthe Arnold
- Lillian Ascough
- Abby Scott Baker
- Josephine Bennett
- Lucy Gwynne Branham
- Lucy Burns
- Palys Chevrier
- Sarah T. Colvin
- Lucy Hyde Ewing
- Estelle Eylward
- Gladys Greiner
- Louisine Havemeyer
- Mrs. Raymond Hunter
- Mary Hall Ingham
- Willie Grace Johnson
- Elizabeth McShane
- Vida Milholland
- Agnes Morey
- Mary Nolan
- Ella Riegel
- Elizabeth Selden Rogers
- Gertrude Shaw
- Mabel Vernon
- Amelia Himes Walker
- Cora Weeks
- Sue Shelton White
- Mary Winsor

=== Tactics ===
Some of the women aboard the Prison Special had some experience with train tours, having worked with the Congressional Union for Woman Suffrage in 1916 to organize the Suffrage Special. By 1919, the more radical NWP declared that this tour "would endeavor to acquaint the country with the lawless and brutal lengths to which the [Wilson] Administration has gone to suppress the lawful agitation for suffrage." To pursue that goal, the women would detail the time they spent in prison for what they insisted was peaceable assembly. Initially, the women wanted to paint the train car they would travel in with prison bars, but the Railway Administration would "not allow the painting of the cars to look like prison cells, nor any other insignia denoting the character and purpose of the car."

Instead, the women opted to highlight their prison experiences by appearing in public dressed in their prison uniforms (or replicas of those uniforms), which they once referred to as the "cloth of guilt" and which had been described as "the clumsiest sort of clothing--heavy, shapeless dresses; underclothing of unbleached muslin and woolen stockings--garments that are hot in the summer and cold in winter, and given to prisoners regardless of season." Two years after their incarceration at Occoquan and at a city jail in Washington, D.C., the women on the Prison Special hoped to use these same uniforms as evidence of the hardship of their struggle. While the adoption of the prison uniform helped to dramatize the struggle for women's suffrage, scholars also point to the ways in which the status of the "Prison Specialists" as elite white women was foregrounded. Newspaper accounts often remarked on their "refinement" and "education" and noted that they were "women of wealth who have chosen to humiliate themselves that attention may be drawn to the cause for which they are fighting." Journalist Carolyn Vance Bell wrote that the women on the Prison Special "were primed to unfold a harrowing tale...[about] the secrets of the prison house which...are guaranteed to freeze the feminine blood..." Such representations suggested that the injuries to these women—as opposed to working-class women or to African-American women—were injuries that mattered.

While programs varied from stop to stop, certain speakers were consistently featured. Louisine Havemeyer regularly spoke first, and was introduced as a grandmother of 11 children and one of the richest women in New York. She often spoke about the cause of women's suffrage being a just one and newspaper reports commented on her dignity and poise. Abby Scott Baker would often speak next; other speakers included Lucy Burns, Mary Winsor, who had spent 66 days in jail, and Lucy Branham. Often, while one woman was speaking, others, dressed in their prison clothes, would stand silently behind her.

In addition to distributing the pamphlet "Jailed for Freedom", the women also handed out a list of grievances against the Wilson Administration, noting that President Wilson "speaks for" women's suffrage, but "does nothing to promote it." A political cartoon drawn by Nina Allender, the official cartoonist for the NWP, shows a suffragist holding a copy of the "Senate Record" and carrying luggage labeled "N.W.P. Democracy Limited" about to board the Prison Special. During the tour, the women held mass meetings, often greeted by delegations of women—NWP members, club women, and others—at local hotels. The women on the Prison Special also used "motion pictures", likely a magic lantern show, as another visual way to represent their experiences of incarceration.

Participants in the Prison Special tour were capable publicists. In an article for Scribner's Magazine, Louisine Havemeyer recalls being asked to take a publicity photo with a police captain because "it will make such a good cut for the newspapers." She was careful to make sure the captain was shaking her hand when the picture was taken so that no one would think she was being arrested on tour.

=== Responses ===
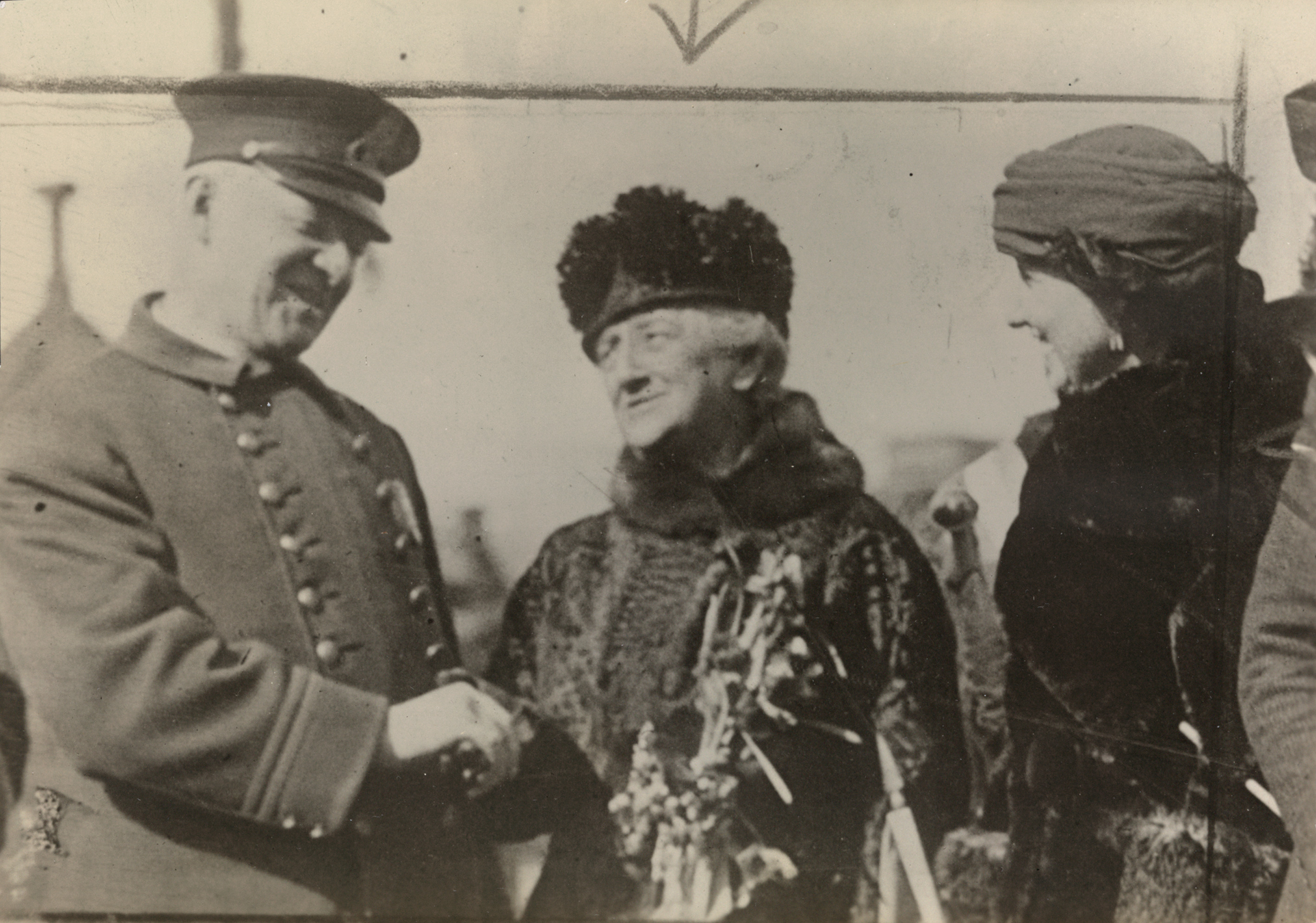
Policeman in Syracuse welcoming Mrs. Henry O. Havemeyer and Miss Vida Milholland on arrival of Prison Special

The Prison Special was a draw for crowds: Abby Scott Baker reported that the police estimated that 2,000 people attended the stop in Charleston, South Carolina. But their reception was not always enthusiastic. Some newspapers reported the meetings encouraged "decidedly unnatural feminine sentiments." Other suffragists wanted to separate themselves from the more radical tactics of the NWP, whose members had burned an effigy of President Wilson the previous year. In Columbia, South Carolina, the mayor warned the women that "disloyal utterances would not be tolerated." The Equal Franchise League in El Paso, Texas, declared that it was "not in sympathy with the militant suffraget class." Often, however, the crowds were in sympathy with the tactics of the Prison Specialists, booing and hissing their treatment and crying "Shame! Shame on our government!"

== Aftermath ==
Just three months after the conclusion of the Prison Special tour, Congress voted for passage of the 19th Amendment in June 1919. State-by-state ratification of the 19th Amendment would end in the successful adoption of the amendment a year later, in August 1920. The NWP, along with several members of the Prison Special tour, would continue the fight for women's rights by supporting the Equal Rights Amendment, a struggle that continues today.

== See also ==
- Suffrage Special
