= Suffrage Special =

1916 women's suffrage tour

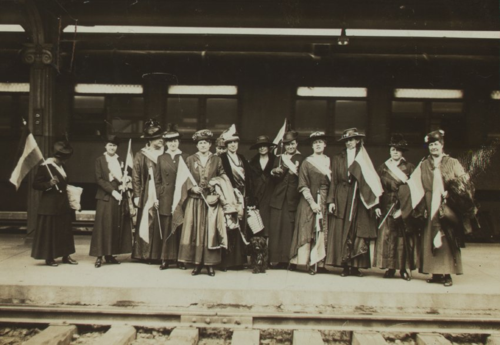
The Suffrage Special envoys outside Washington, D.C., on their return in May 1916.

The Suffrage Special was an event created by the Congressional Union for Woman Suffrage in 1916. The Suffrage Special toured the "free states" which had already allowed women's suffrage in the United States. The delegates were raising awareness of the national women's suffrage amendment. They were also looking to start a new political party, the National Women's Party (NWP). The Suffrage Special, also known as the "flying squadron" left Washington, D.C., and toured the Western states by train for 38 days starting on April 9, 1916. Famous and well-known suffragists made up the envoy of the Suffrage Special. They toured several states during their journey and were largely well-received. When the tour was over, the delegates of the Suffrage Special visited Congress where they presented petitions for women's suffrage they had collected on their journey.

== About ==
The Congressional Union for Woman Suffrage started planning a tour of woman's clubs in the Western United States in Spring of 1916. Since most of the states that had passed the women's vote were in the West, the idea was to recruit and use the voices of women voters from these states to speak for national women's suffrage. The suffragists wanted the women who were allowed to vote in their home states to support the national amendment. The group intended to announce plans to form a National Woman's Party. In addition, they obtained petitions from across the country to present to President Woodrow Wilson. The tour lasted 38 days and covered the states that had already allowed women's suffrage.

The Special was planned to leave Washington, D.C., on April 9, 1916. Louisine Havemeyer, who was unable to take part, donated $300 to the Suffrage Special. Much of the financing for the trip was carried out by Alva Belmont.

Ella Reigel and Lucy Burns led the delegation which was planned to consist of 36 women. Twenty-three envoys actually made the trip when the Special left on April 9. They were also known as the "flying squadron" of the Congressional Union.

Many of the women involved were considered "famous" and it was a draw to see them speaking live. Abby Scott Baker, Alva Belmont, Harriet Stanton Blatch, Lucy Burns, Florence Bayard Hilles and Inez Milholland were famous at the time. "Working Woman," Melinda Scott, was also profiled. Overall, the women were generally well received in the West. Often, when they arrived, their stops were already decorated in purple, white and gold, the suffrage colors.

== Stops ==
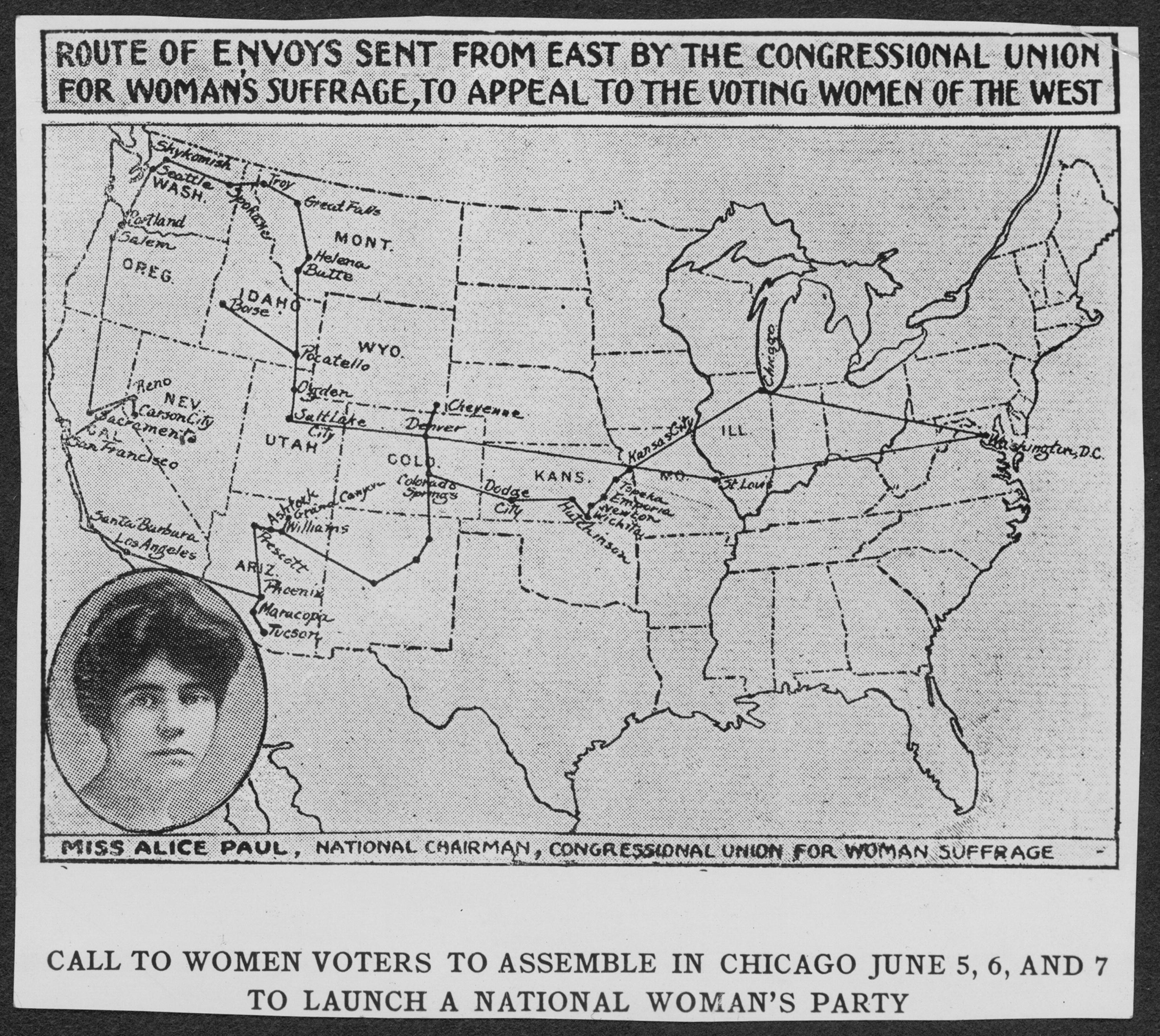
Route taken by the Suffrage Special.

Before the Suffrage Special left Washington, D.C., there was a farewell luncheon with speakers and music held at the headquarters for the Congressional Union. Florence Finch Kelley served as the event's toastmaster. The suffragists' private train car was "christened" with grape juice before the train pulled out. Around five thousand supporters saw the train off and a brass band played "Onward Christian Soldiers" as they began their journey. The car itself was decorated with colors associated with the suffrage movement: yellow, white and purple.

The group arrived in Chicago on April 10. The suffragists had planned a parade from Union Station, proceeding to a reception at the Congressional Union headquarters in the Stevens building. Mounted police acted as escorts to the headquarters. There was a public reception at the Chicago Art Institute that evening and the next day, Governor Edward Fitzsimmons Dunne met with the suffragists in the name of the state of Illinois. These events were well-attended. The Suffrage Special headed for Kansas in the evening of April 11.

The Suffrage Special stopped in Kansas City, Missouri, for an hour and a half on April 12. They then went to Topeka, Kansas, where representatives were entertained at a luncheon on April 12. Mabel Vernon met the Suffrage Special at the station. There were around 150 attending the luncheon in Topeka. After the luncheon, women marched into the business district and spoke on the topic of federal women's suffrage. They also went to Washburn College, where their event in the Pelletier tea room was "packed to capacity." Vernon arranged for the women to meet in Wichita, Kansas, the next day. There was a night meeting in Wichita and on April 14, the Suffrage Special stopped at Newton, Hutchinson, Emporia and Dodge City, Kansas.

On April 15, the Suffrage Special arrived in Denver. The women continued to speak on the topic of national women's suffrage, held luncheons and a mass meeting. The group arrived in Colorado Springs on April 17. They were treated to a sightseeing trip in the mountains and in the evening, spoke at a mass meeting. They also made a stop in Cheyenne, Wyoming.

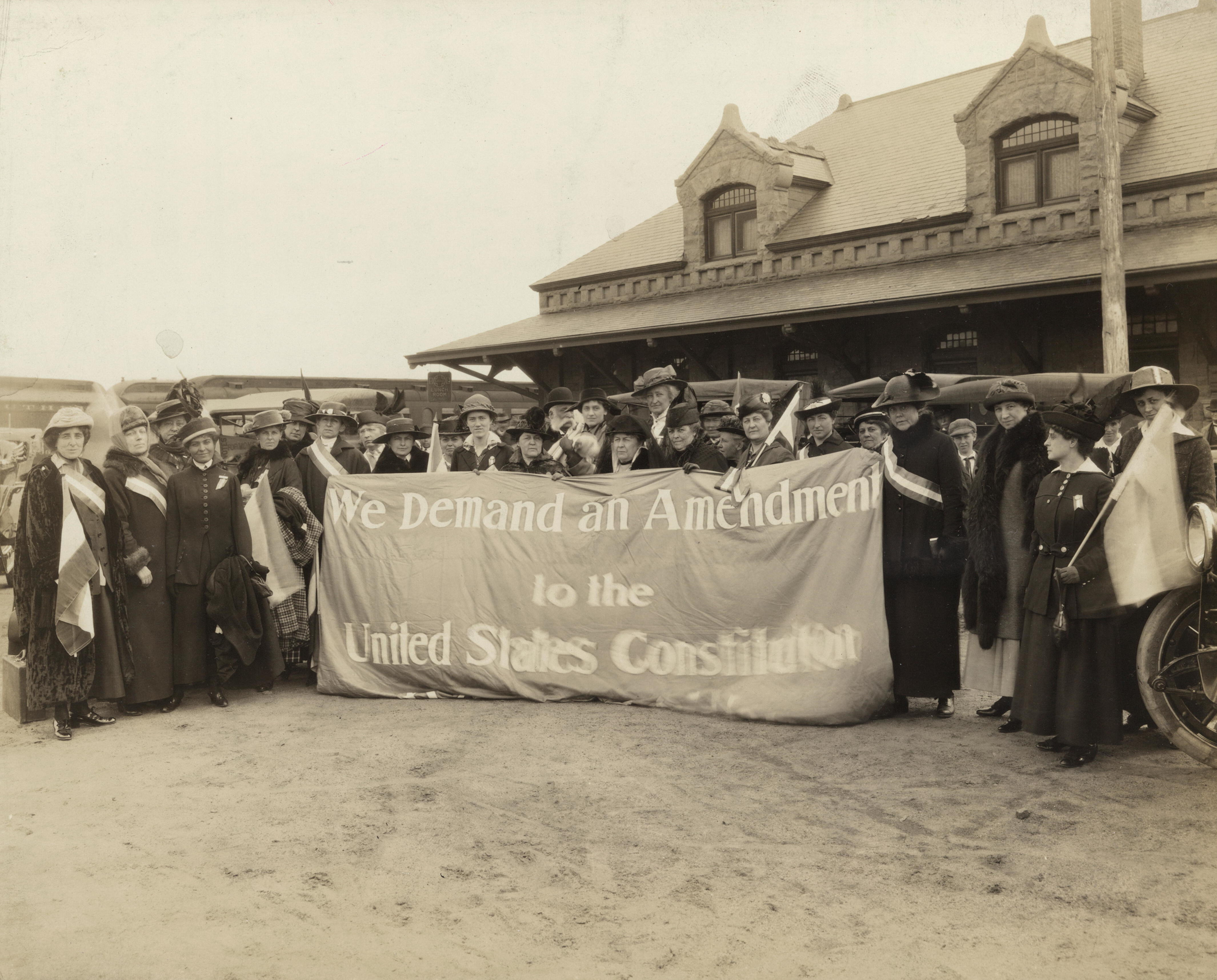
Suffrage Special envoys in Colorado Springs.

The Suffrage Special arrived in Tucson, Arizona, on April 20. In Tucson, the suffragists were given a tour of the city and spoke at a luncheon and then at a banquet in the city. The train arrived in Phoenix, Arizona, on April 21, where Dr. Marian Walker Williams welcomed them at a luncheon at the Adams Hotel. The train had also stopped briefly in Maricopa.

On April 22, the Suffrage Special envoys had a smaller welcome in Los Angeles. Clara Shortridge Foltz met them at the station with a dozen women and took the group to the Alexandria Hotel for a reception. Women in Los Angeles were not excited about the mission of the delegates and were not overly supportive of the formation of another party. The train left Los Angeles on April 24 making a short stop in Santa Barbara. In San Francisco, the Suffrage Special arrived on April 26 and were welcomed by the mayor's secretary, Edward Rainey and later met with Mayor James Rolph. The group held a large meeting, which was run by Gail Laughlin. The train arrived in Reno, Nevada on April 26 in the evening. On April 27, the Suffrage Special arrived in Carson City, Nevada, where they were met by Governor Emmet D. Boyle. Like women in Los Angeles, women in Nevada were not very supportive of the idea of forming a new women's party. The train stopped in Sacramento in the morning on April 28, during which time the delegates attended a luncheon which included 1,500 invitees.

The Suffrage Special arrived in Salem, Oregon on April 29. In Oregon, a resolution had been passed by both men and women which criticized Congress for not passing an amendment for national women's suffrage. The delegates left with several cases of loganberry juice and continued in the morning of April 30 to Portland, Oregon.

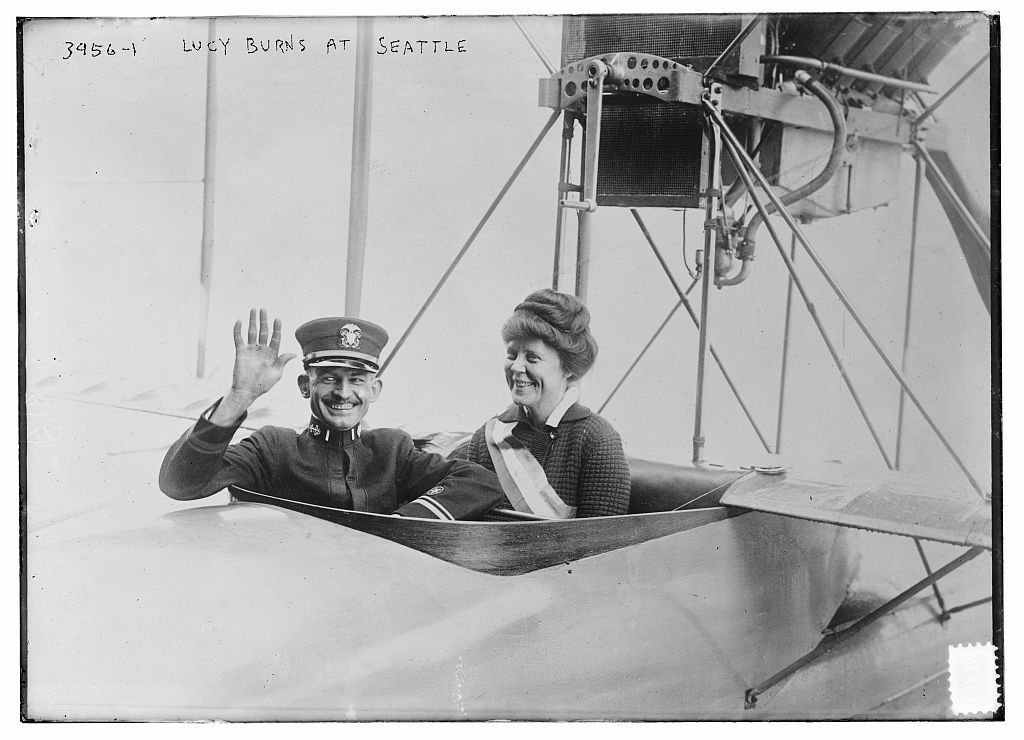
Lucy Burns in an airplane in Seattle.

The Suffrage Special arrived in Seattle on May 1, spending two days with various events in the city. The delegates were met at the train depot, taken on a trip in the city and gave speeches, ending the first day with a mass meeting. The meeting took place at the Moore Theatre and had a crowd of 1,500 people. The next day, the envoys were guests of the Women's Civic Club, and there were additional meetings. In Seattle, Lucy Burns was treated to an airplane ride where she scattered leaflets over the city from the air. On May 4, the train stopped in Spokane in the evening and there was a reception in the Davenport Hotel. In Spokane, the group adopted a black, stray dog and named him "Spokie." Another event that took place with the group in Spokane was the planting of a tree in memory of the suffragist May Arkwright Hutton.

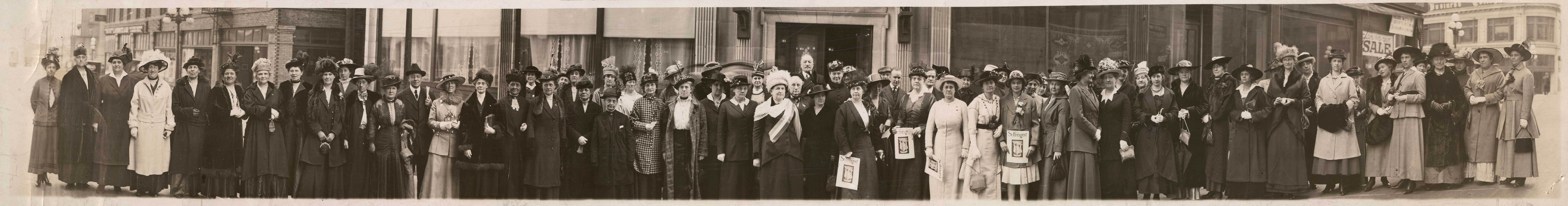
Women's Suffrage supporters meet with the envoys in Seattle on May 2, 1916.

The train spent several hours in Great Falls, Montana, on May 7. There was a mass meeting in Helena, Montana, and while Elizabeth Selden Rogers was speaking, the lights went out but Rogers continued with her speech. They arrived that afternoon in Butte. In Butte, they visited the city's mines and then had dinner at the Thornton Hotel. Afterwards, they drove through the business district and went on to the city's auditorium for speeches, rallying the women to support a national suffrage amendment. In Butte, Spokie, the dog was kidnapped and taken into a saloon, where the men thought the women would not dare to go. Abby Scott Baker retrieved the dog and got the bartender to drink to the "health of suffrage" during the event. The next day, the delegates visited another mine and held another luncheon with speakers at the Thornton Hotel.

They traveled from Pocatello to Boise, arriving there on May 9. The envoys arrived in Boise in the evening, where they were escorted to Pinney Theater for a mass meeting. On May 10, the envoys met with state officials at a morning reception. Governor Moses Alexander promised that Idaho would ratify a national suffrage amendment. The train left at noon for a mass meeting to be held in Pocatello.

Ida Smoot was involved in welcoming the Suffrage Special to Salt Lake City on May 11. The group arrived in the morning and were escorted to Hotel Utah. After breakfast at the hotel, they were guests of the First Presidency and entertained by an organ recital at the Tabernacle. They were then escorted by mounted police in a street parade. Meetings were carried on through the day. The next day, a business session was held at Hotel Utah and farewell demonstrations at Pioneer Park followed in the afternoon.

On May 14, the train stopped for three hours in St. Joseph, Missouri for dinner and a meeting at the Scottish Rite Cathedral.

The Suffrage Special returned to Washington, D.C., on May 16, where a "White Luncheon" took place in Union Station. Around 300 women attended the luncheon. A parade was held as the delegates took their petitions to the United States Congress. Three hundred schoolgirls dressed in white "formed aisles up the broad, impressive steps of the Capitol as the delegates marched in with their petitions." The delegates also had five girls precede them, "strewing flowers in their path." At the top of the steps, Belva Ann Lockwood held a Congressional Union banner. As they marched, "The Women's Marseillaise" was played. The Senate officially recessed to receive the delegates. Legislators were surrounded by a rope held by a hundred women and around them, a ring of yellow ribbon was held by the girls. The women then addressed Congress and implored them to support women's suffrage. The envoys had brought a 150-pound iced cake as a gift for President Wilson.

== Aftermath ==
In June 1916, the women involved with the Suffrage Special held a Woman's Party Convention in Chicago and created the National Woman's Party (NWP).

== Delegates ==
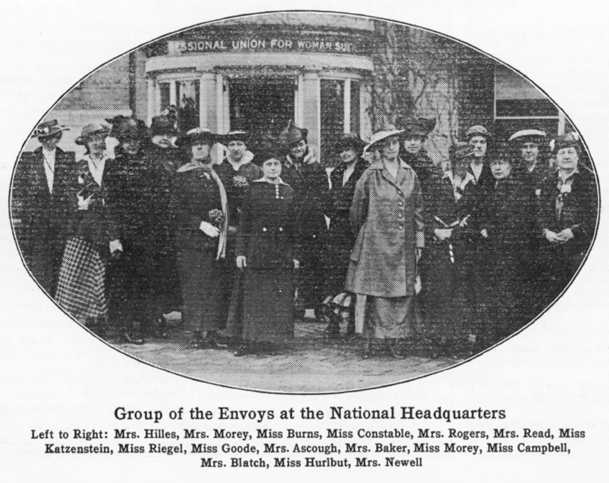
Group of the envoys at the national headquarters

Delegates represented several states in the Eastern United States and the Midwest. Anne Henrietta Martin from Nevada accompanied the delegates for part of the journey. Women who had been chosen at the Woman Voter Conference in Salt Lake City accompanied the original envoys. Spokie, or Spokane, the adopted stray dog who accompanied the delegates went with Helen Todd to New York after the trip.

=== Original delegates ===
- Lillian Ascough, Connecticut
- Abby Scott Baker, Washington, D.C.
- Alva Belmont, New York
- Harriet Stanton Blatch, New York
- Lucy Burns, New York
- Mrs. A. R. Colvin, Minnesota
- Agnes Campbell, New Jersey
- Anna Constable, New York
- Edith J. Goode, Ohio
- Jane Goode, Ohio
- Florence Bayard Hilles, Delaware
- Julia Hurlbut, New Jersey
- Caroline Katzenstein, Pennsylvania
- Winifred Mallon, Washington, D.C.
- Dorothy Mead, Ohio
- Inez Milholland, New York
- Agnes Morey, Massachusetts
- Katherine Morey, Massachusetts
- Gertrude B. Newell, Massachusetts
- Marion T. Read, Virginia
- Ella Riegel, Pennsylvania
- Elizabeth Selden Rogers, New York
- Melinda Scott, New York
- Mrs. Townsend Scott, Maryland
- Helen Todd, New York

=== Delegates from convention ===
- Mrs. John B. Allen, Washington
- Mrs. Frederick C. Alsdorf, Arizona
- Frances Axtell, Washington
- Mrs. Dan Casement, Kansas
- Elizabeth Gerberding, California
- Mrs. Oscar Groshell, Utah
- Frances Haire, Montana
- Phoebe Hearst, California
- Alice Reynolds, Utah
- Mrs. Wallace Williams, Washington

== See also ==
- Prison Special
- National Women's Party
