= Abby Scott Baker =

American suffragist

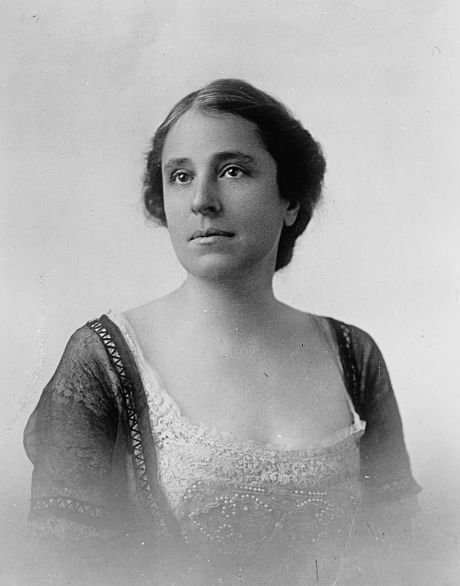
- Born: July 24, 1871; Louisville, Kentucky, U.S.
- Died: May 13, 1944 (aged 72); Washington, D.C., U.S.
- Occupation: Suffragist
- Spouse: Robert Walker Baker (m. 1863)
- Children: 3

Abby Pearce Scott Baker (July 24, 1871 – May 13, 1944) was an American suffragist and women's rights advocate. She served as Political Chair of the National Woman's Party, and played a key role in putting the NWP in the media spotlight in the months leading up to the ratification of Nineteenth Amendment to the United States Constitution. She was also active in the Congressional Union for Women's Suffrage. Baker was seen as instrumental in bridging the gap across administrations, from Woodrow Wilson, who was deeply hostile toward the NWP, to Harding, who was seen as more willing to engage the NWP in dialogue, and brought women's participation in party politics to a more acceptable place in the public discourse.

== Biography ==
She was born on July 24, 1871, as Abby Pearce Scott in Louisville, Kentucky, to Robert Nicholson Scott (1838–1887) and Elizabeth Goodale Casey (1844–1912). Her father and grandfather were Army officers.

She was educated at the Norwood Institute.

She married Robert Walker Baker (1863–1956) on 24 May 1893 at the Church of the Covenant in Washington D.C. The couple had three sons.

== Suffrage activist ==
Baker was one of Alice Paul’s earliest associates. She helped Alice Paul and Lucy Burns plan their first major event–the March 3, 1913, national suffrage parade on the eve of Woodrow Wilson’s inauguration.

In 1914 she served as treasurer of the Congressional Union for Woman Suffrage.

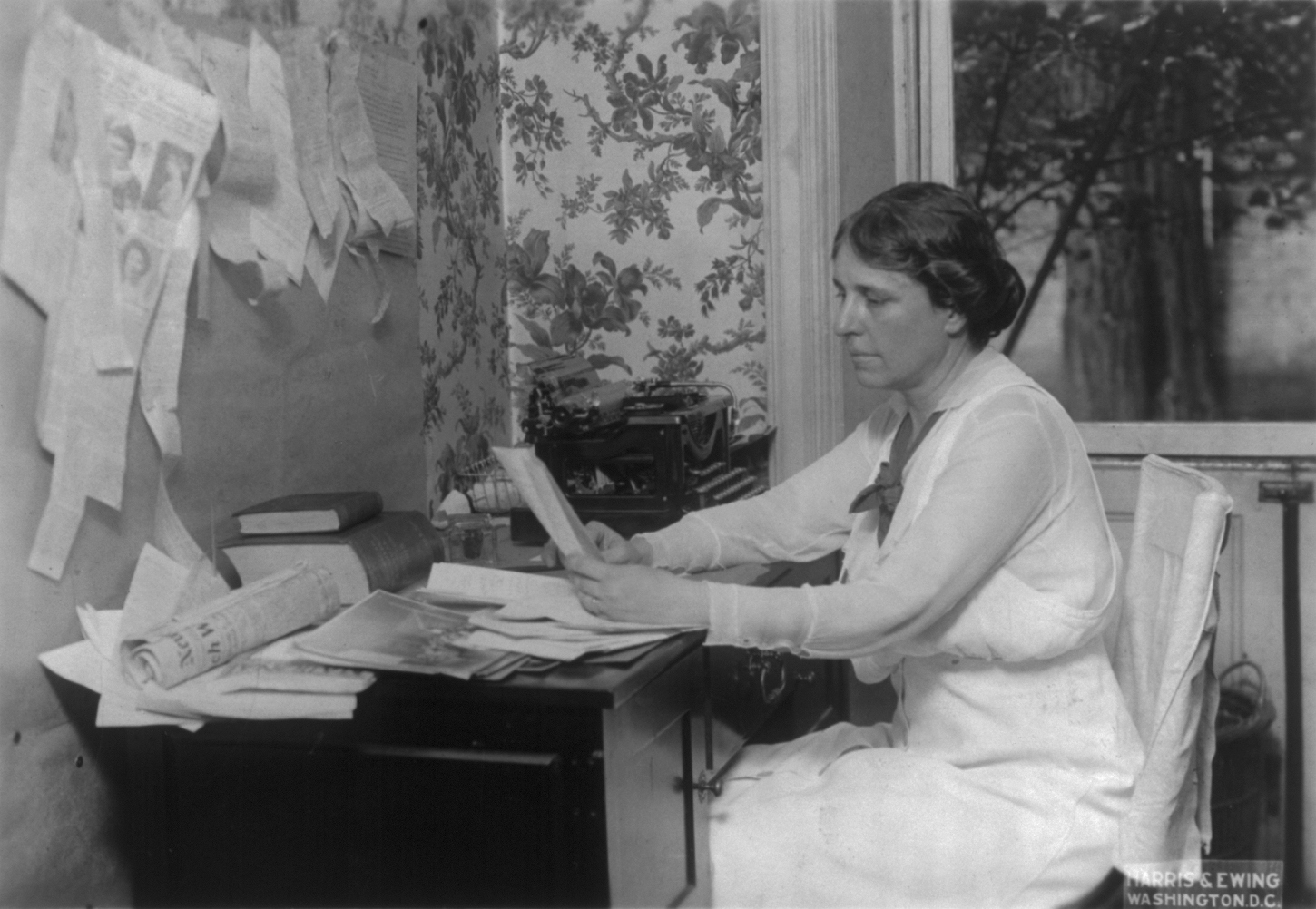
Mrs. Abby Scott Baker seated at her desk, Washington, D.C. (Library of Congress, Bain Collection)

Baker traveled the country as part of the Congressional Union’s “Suffrage Special” train tour of western states in April–May 1916. Baker was in charge of handling the press for the tour. The support that she helped raise from women in states that had already granted women's suffrage. On April 29, Baker wrote to The Suffragist on how the tour was received '[Men] invariably call out, 'Here come the Suffragettes,' but very soon they are saying, 'She's all right,' and 'That's straight lady,' or some such approving phrase..." The tour culminated in a June 1916 meeting in Chicago to form what was at first called the Woman's Party of Western Voters, or Woman's Party, for short (NWP). When the NWP was more formally organized in relation to the CU in March 1917, Baker was elected to the NWP executive committee and served as its press chair (1917–18) and political chair (1917; 1919–21).

Baker was among the first demonstrators to picket the White House; she was arrested in September 1917 and sentenced to 60 days in the Occoquan Workhouse. In February–March 1919, she served as publicity manager and speaker for the Prison Special, a three-week lecture tour by NWP activists who spoke to packed audiences about their jail experiences in an effort to generate support for the suffrage cause. The other speakers included Lillian Ascough, Harriot Stanton Blatch and Lucy Burns. They spoke publicly, distributed literature, and sold the Suffragist. This tour was credited with arousing interest in federal suffrage among, prospective, voting age women.

When the NWP's patriotism was challenged, she reminded critics that her three sons were fighting in World War I.

Baker maintained an intense travel schedule before and during the campaign season for the 1920 presidential election, shuttling between the campaign headquarters of Warren G. Harding in Ohio and James M. Cox in Tennessee, building close relationships with both candidates. Baker's indefatigable efforts drew a great deal of media attention, and helped to normalize the presence of women in the political sphere in the public imagination.

== Later life ==
After suffrage was achieved, Baker became a member of the NWP's Committee on International Relations and the Women's Consultative Committee of the League of Nations. She also represented the NWP at the League's 1935 international conferences in Geneva where the issue of equal rights was discussed.

She died on May 13, 1944, in Washington, D.C.
