= Helen M. Todd =

American suffragist and workers' rights activist

Helen MacGregor Todd
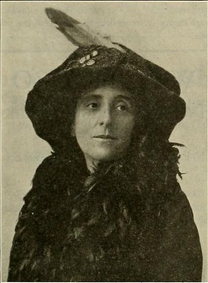
- Born: April 1, 1870
- Died: August 15, 1953 (aged 83); New York City, U.S.
- Occupation: Suffragist

Helen MacGregor Todd (April 1, 1870 – August 15, 1953) was an American suffragist and worker's rights activist. Todd started her career as an educator and later became a factory inspector. She wrote about child laborers in factories and became concerned with working women's lack of voting rights. Todd campaigned for women's suffrage across the United States and was an envoy on the Suffrage Special. After women won the right to vote, she continued to advocate for immigrants, workers and women.

== Biography ==
Early in Todd's career, she worked as a teacher in Chicago. She became involved with Hull House and went into social work. Eventually, she became an Illinois state factory inspector. During her time as an inspector, she studied child laborers and their attitudes about working and education. She interviewed 800 children who worked in factories and published her findings in the April 1913 edition of McClure's Magazine. She was also concerned about women workers and the fact that they had no power because they could not vote. This led to Todd's interest in the woman's suffrage movement.

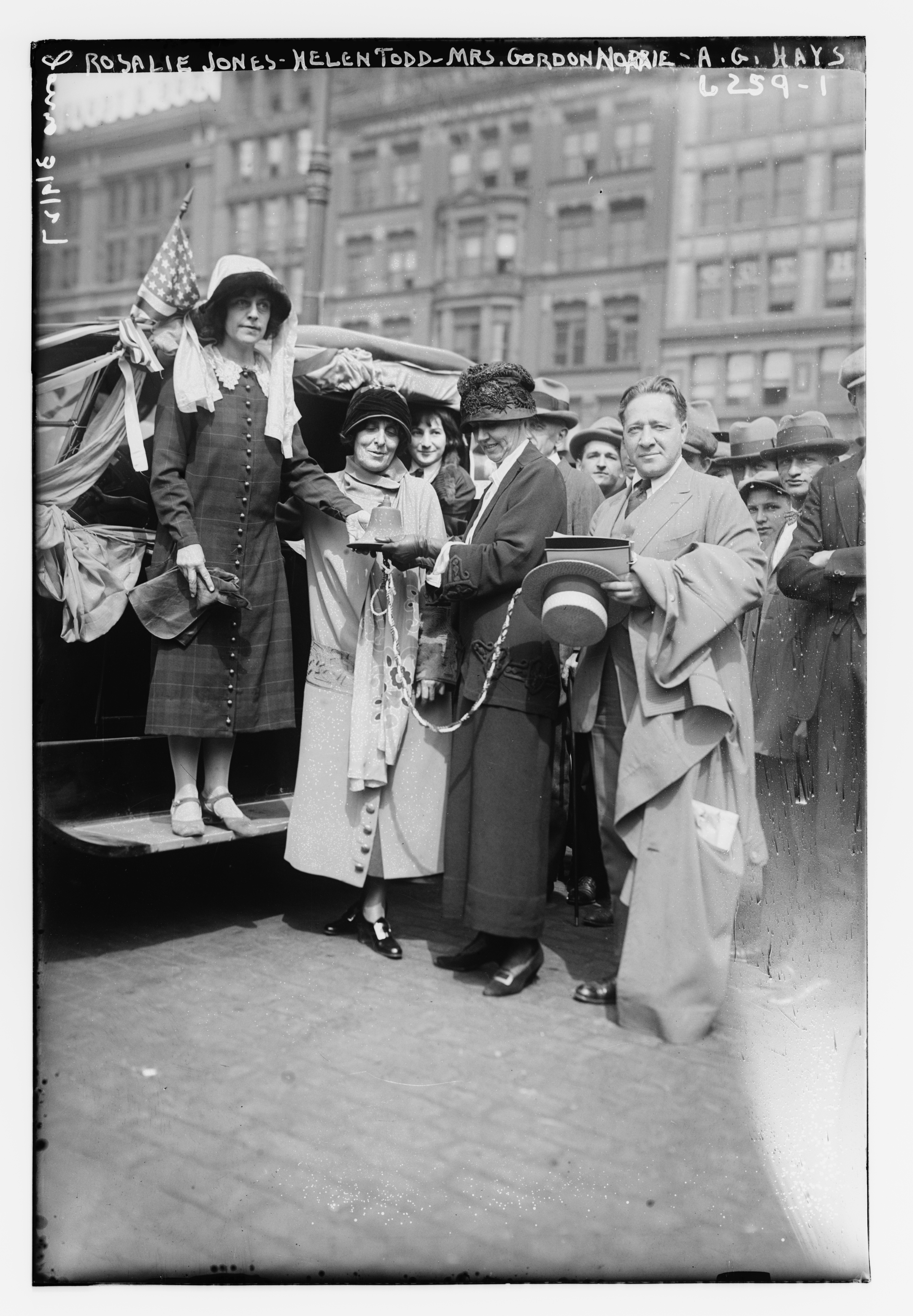
Rosalie Jones, Helen Todd, Mrs. Gordon Norrie and A.G. Hays on an auto tour

In 1910, she took part in an automobile tour to support women's suffrage where she and others spoke to factory workers. Around 1911, she helped popularize the labor movement slogan, "bread and roses." Also in 1911, she went to San Francisco to speak on the topic of suffrage and working women and children. Women in San Francisco asked her to stay on to help organize and support the effort to encourage women to vote in California. Todd asked women in California to use their right to vote in order to help make life better for workers, especially women workers. Todd went on to help in other states to win women's suffrage, but eventually came to feel that an amendment for national women's suffrage was critical. In 1913, she testified in front of the House of Representatives on women's suffrage. She spoke with men in New York, urging them to support women's right to vote in 1915. In 1916 she was an envoy for the state of New York on the Suffrage Special, which toured the United States encouraging support for national women's suffrage. When the Silent Sentinels were arrested and mistreated in prison, Todd worked to look into the abuses they faced. She represented the Committee of 1,000 Women who urged their release.

In 1918, Todd campaigned for Al Smith in his campaign for governor of New York. She also campaigned for Robert M. La Follette during his 1924 presidential campaign. After women gained the right to vote, Todd continued advocating for women and workers. In 1920, she created a "Woman to Woman" committee which would bring working and immigrant women into dialogue with American women. Todd also campaigned for women's right to learn about birth control, working with Margaret Sanger.

Following the war, she led a protest parade against a blockade that she stated was preventing the supply of milk and medicine to Russian children. When Russian communists were deported, she worked to help the 100 children and wives of these men. She advocated for the United States to recognize Soviet Russia. In 1922, she was active in a movement to provide food for hungry Austrian children. In 1926, she was a member of the citizen's committee of striking textile workers of Passaic, New Jersey. Between 1926 and 1927, she helped finance low-cost housing called Twin Peaks in Greenwich Village for artists, working with Otto H. Kahn and Samuel Untermyer. The housing project was later named the Artist and Writers House.

Todd lived on Waverly Place in Greenwich Village. She died on August 15, 1953, at Columbus Hospital in New York.
