= Ella Riegel =

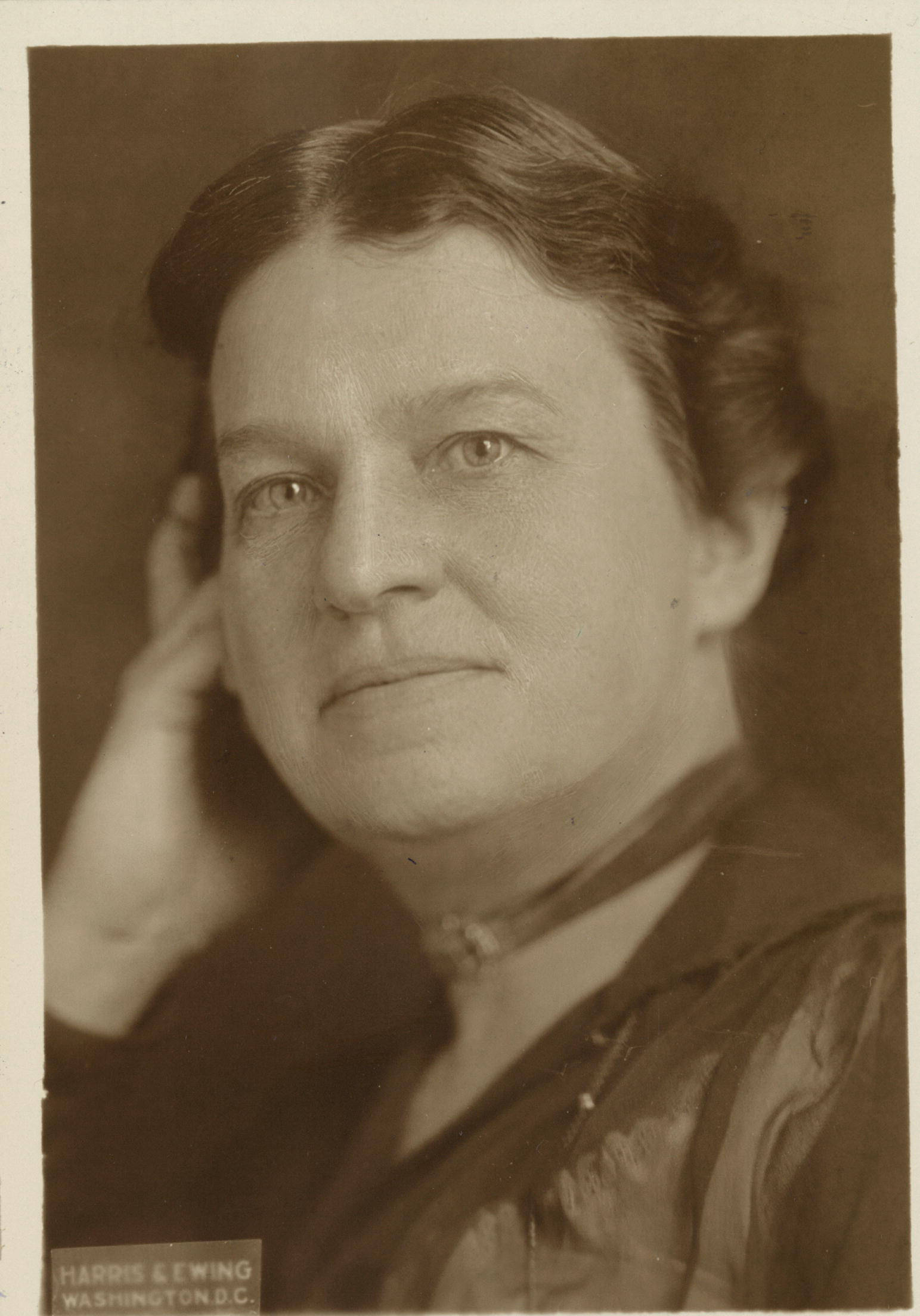
Ella Riegel, ca. 1918.

Ella Riegel (1867 - January 20, 1937) was an American suffragist and women's rights activist. Riegel was a graduate of the first class of Bryn Mawr College and would remain associated with the college the rest of her life.

== Biography ==
Regel was born in 1866 in Pennsylvania. Riegel was part of the first class of Bryn Mawr College and graduated in 1889. She became interested in anthropology and archaeology. Riegel was also good with finances and made money through investing in stocks.

Riegel promoted the cause of women's suffrage in many different ways. She was first part of the Congressional Union for Woman's Suffrage, where she served on their finance committee. Later, she joined the National Woman's Party (NWP). In 1916, she was part of the "Suffrage Special," a group of more than twenty suffragists who traveled to the West to promote woman's suffrage. Riegel served as the business manager for the Suffrage Special. Along with Mrs. Charles Wister Ruschenberger, she sent photographs of a "women's liberty bell" to each United States Senator. The bell had a chained tongue, so it could not ring. In 1919, Riegel met with James P. Goodrich, Governor of Indiana, to urge him to call a special legislative session to ratify the woman's suffrage amendment.

In a 75-woman protest carried out on February 9, 1919, Riegel was arrested. The protest was part of a series of "watch fires" carried out by the NWP due to the failure of the Senate to pass the 19th amendment. Riegel carried a suffrage banner and was one of 47 women arrested. She later helped organize the Prison Special to raise awareness about the imprisonment of activists and the inhumane treatment they received in jail.

After women won suffrage rights, Riegel continued to fight for expanding rights in Pennsylvania, where she served as the chair of the state NWP. Riegel also fought for women's independent citizenship and full guardianship of their own children. Riegel was the woman's party delegate to the Hague conference for the Codification of International Law in 1930. She traveled through Europe and Latin America and worked with the Women's Consultative Committee of the League of Nations.

Riegel died in her apartment on Bryn Mawr campus on January 20, 1937. She left $100,000 from her estate to Bryn Mawr, and an archaeology scholarship was created in her name. In 1940, an archaeological museum named for Riegel was opened in the Bryn Mawr library.
