= Congressional Union for Woman Suffrage =

American activist organization

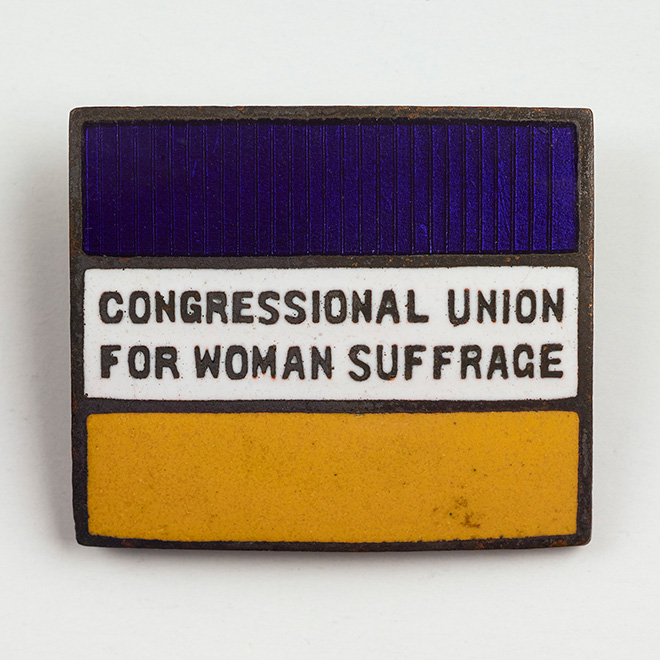
- Congressional Union for Woman Suffrage pin, c. 1914–1917
- Abbreviation: CU or CUWS
- Formation: April 1913
- Dissolved: 1916
- Type: NGO
- Purpose: "To secure an amendment to the United States Constitution enfranchising women" and to pass the ERA
- Headquarters: Washington, DC
- Key people: Alice Paul, Lucy Burns
- Formerly called: National American Woman Suffrage Association Congressional Committee

The Congressional Union for Woman Suffrage was an American organization formed in 1913 led by Alice Paul and Lucy Burns to campaign for a constitutional amendment guaranteeing women's suffrage. It was inspired by the United Kingdom's suffragette movement, which Paul and Burns had taken part in. Their continuous campaigning drew attention from congressmen, and in 1914 they were successful in forcing the amendment onto the floor for the first time in decades.

== Early history ==
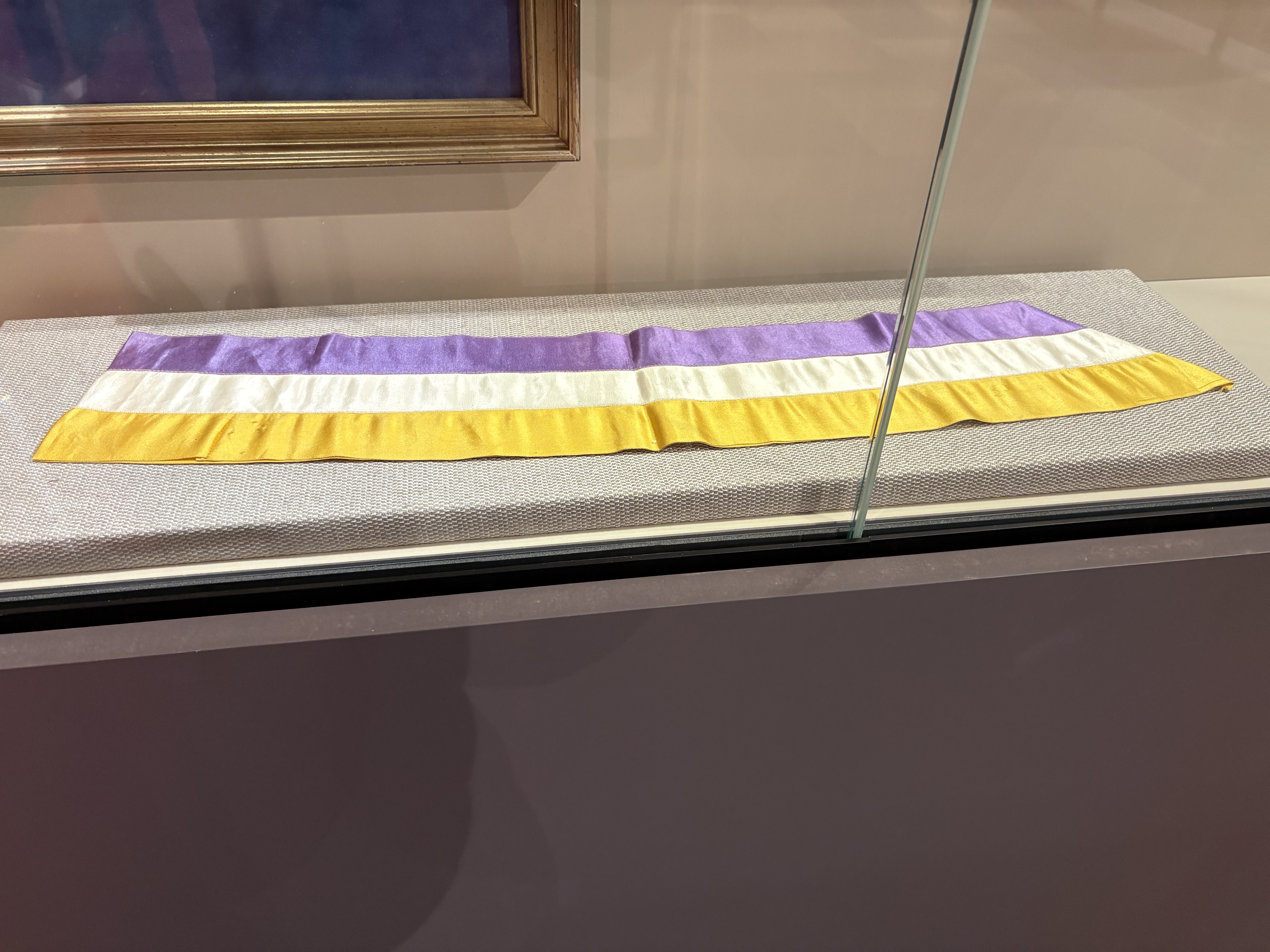
A Congressional Union sash worn by Frances Schagrin in Wilmington, Delaware’s parade for women’s suffrage on May 2, 1914.

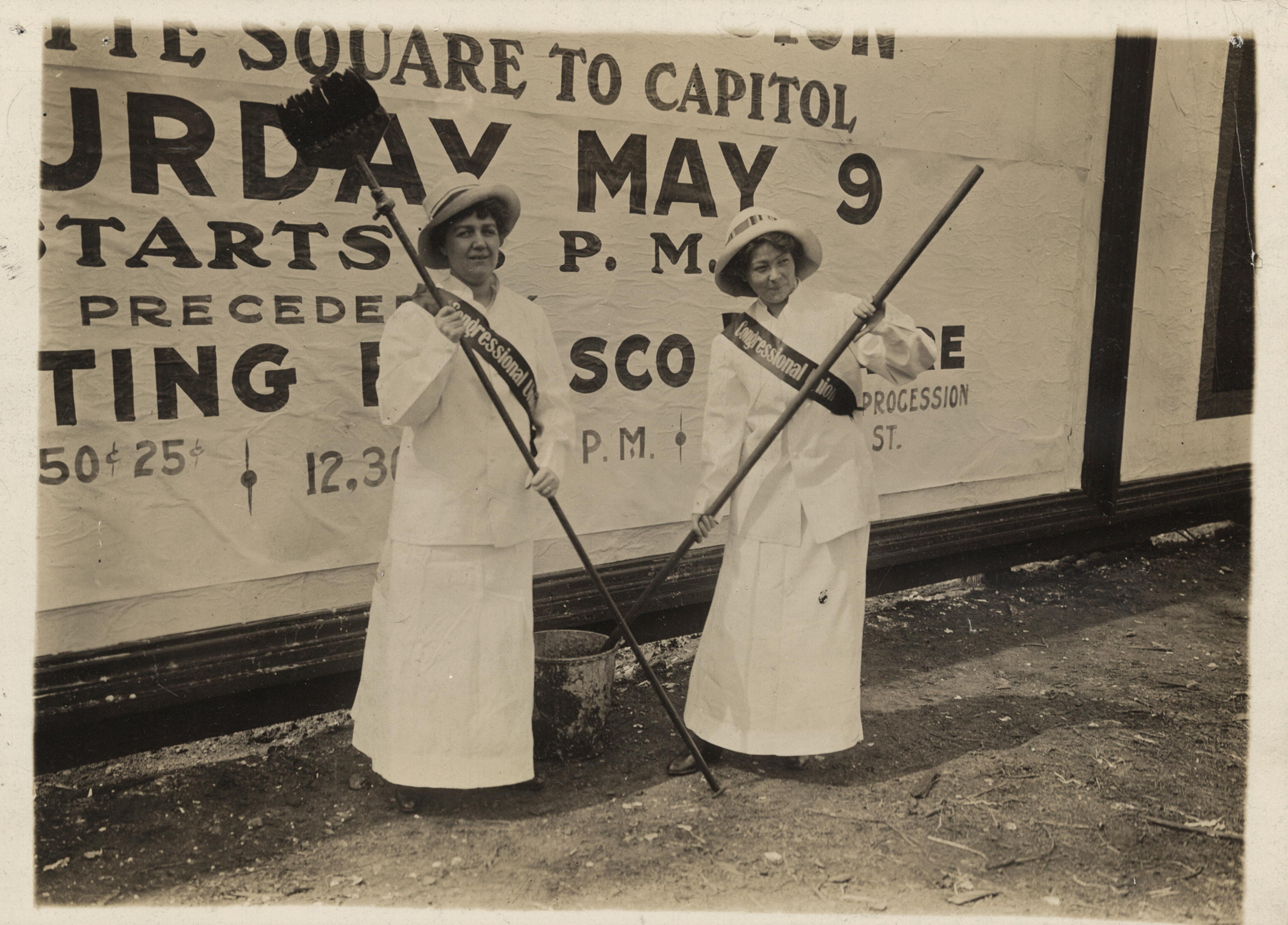
Members of the CUWS holding brushes in front of a large billboard, 1914

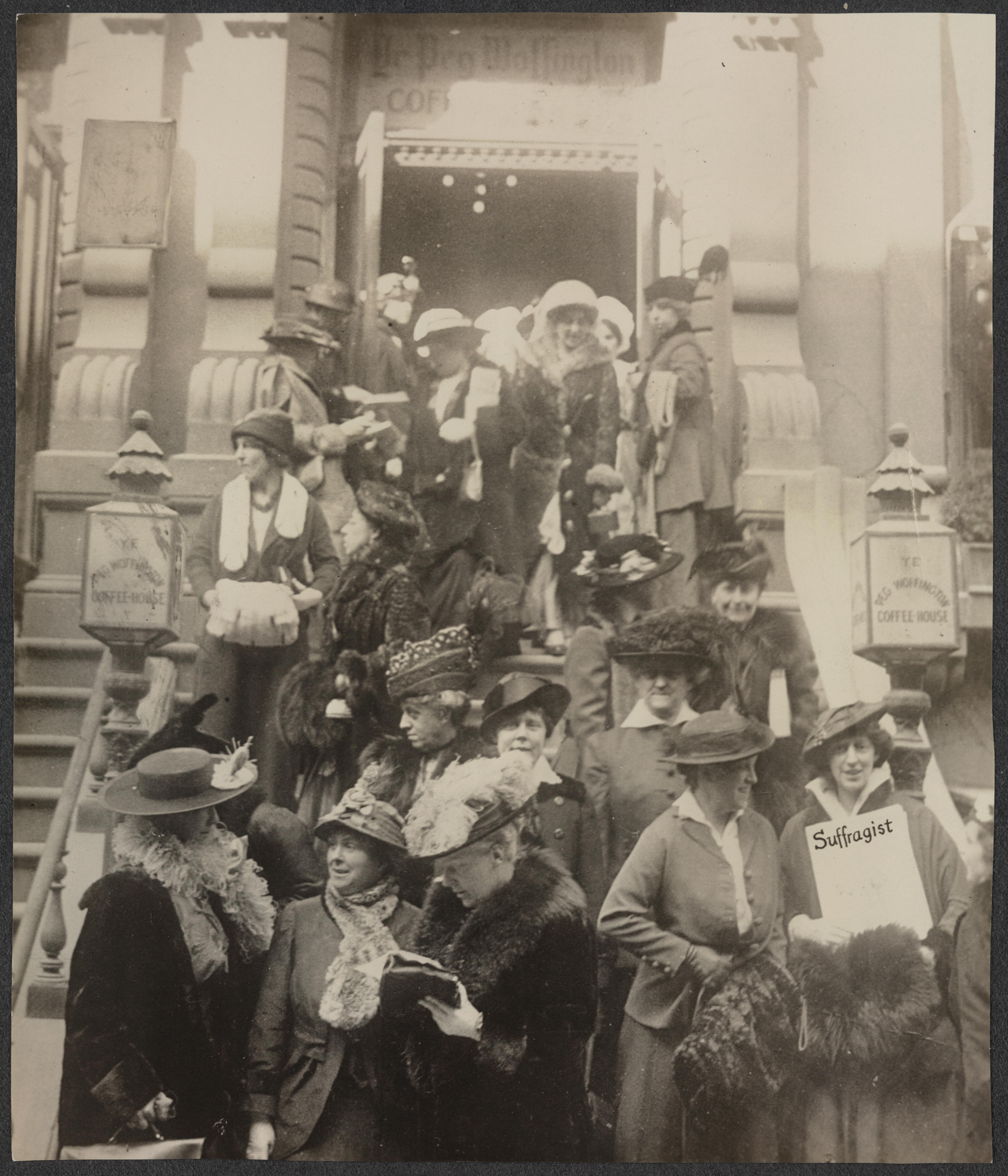
Meeting at Coffee House, New York, 1915

Alice Paul created the Congressional Union (CU) in 1913 after joining the National American Woman Suffrage Association (NAWSA) and gaining leadership of its Congressional Committee. She formed the CU to assist the Congressional Committee, and CU officers were part of that committee. The CU shared the same goal as NAWSA: to add an amendment to the United States Constitution giving all women the right to vote.

In the beginning, the CU worked within NAWSA to strengthen the declining Congressional Committee. In March 1913, after realizing the amount of work to be done, the CU became in charge of their own operations and funding but still remained affiliated with NAWSA. In the fall of 1913, Carrie Chapman Catt of NAWSA accused the CU of insubordination and financial irregularities, allegations which she later retracted. The strategies of the two organizations conflicted and NAWSA's leadership felt threatened. In December 1913, NAWSA selected a new Congressional Committee and formally cut ties with the Congressional Union.

== Initiative ==
The Congressional Union for Woman Suffrage appealed to young women with a new approach in the fight for women's suffrage, inspired by the British suffragettes. Alice Paul believed women should not have to beg for their rights. Paul introduced some of the militant methods used by the Women's Social and Political Union in Britain to the CU and its members. These included direct actions, organizing huge demonstrations, and the daily picketing of the White House. The CU had 4,500 members and had raised more than $50,000 in funds by 1914. Over time, the efforts of hundreds of members led to their arrest and sometimes imprisonment.

Hundreds of donors financed the CU, with most giving under $50. 55 donors gave more than $1000 apiece by 1920, providing 60% of the CU's total funds. Of these major donors, 38 were women, ten were couples, and only seven were single men. Many of these women were able to give due to their financial independence from men, often because they were widows or unmarried. Alva Belmont and Mary Burnham donated the most, covering 20% of the CU's funds between them. Belmont gave $76,502 and Burnham $38,170.

== Organization ==
The Congressional Union's headquarters were located on F Street in Washington, D.C., near the Willard Hotel in a highly visible office which they paid for themselves. They started women's "suffrage schools" to spread awareness about their cause and held multiple meetings each day. The CU was never organized by states or districts, but there were different branches of the organization in a number of states. The Washington headquarters was central to their work but they were also a mobile organization. The CU published a newspaper called The Suffragist, featuring articles by prominent members including Alice Paul, Lucy Burns and Inez Milholland. The newspaper employed Nina Allender as its main cartoonist, and also published cartoons by artists such as Cornelia Barns, Boardman Robinson and Marietta Minnigerode Andrews.

== Campaigning ==
The Congressional Union actively campaigned for a constitutional amendment guaranteeing universal woman suffrage. Following the methods used by suffragettes in Britain, the CU fully blamed the majority party for failure to advance the Federal Suffrage Amendment. The majority party at the time was the Democratic Party, and Democrat Woodrow Wilson was president. Members traveled west and campaigned against Democrats in hopes of impeding their reelection. They even campaigned against Democrats who approved women's suffrage, despite criticism from the National American Woman Suffrage Association. They traveled through the west by train while using a number of tactics to increase their visibility and their whistle-stop speeches attracted the attention of reporters. Their campaign resulted in the defeat of 20 Democrats who supported suffrage, much to the dismay of NAWSA.

== National Woman's Party ==
The Congressional Union created the National Woman's Party at a meeting in Chicago in 1916. The party included members of the Congressional Union, and Alice Paul was in charge. A Campaign Committee was formed within the party with Anne Martin serving as chairman. In 1917, the two organizations officially joined to form the National Woman's Party (NWP) and elected Alice Paul as their chairman. After the ratification of the 19th Amendment, the National Woman's Party launched a long campaign to secure the passage of the Equal Rights Amendment.

== Congressional Union for the Equal Rights Amendment ==
In 1981, a group of women including Mary Ann Beall and notable feminist Sonia Johnson formed an organization they called Congressional Union in New York City to continue to struggle for the ERA. The women were inspired by the suffragists as Johnson noted in her book, Going Out of Our Minds: The Metaphysics of Liberation, "...we called ourselves the Congressional Union, taking the name and philosophy from the women's suffrage group created in 1914 by Alice Paul and Lucy Burns..." At the end of June in 1982, the Congressional Union organized a "ritual of mourning" as well as a "celebration of rebirth" for the ERA at the National Archives.

This organization later splintered off and a group of women including Johnson formed a new feminist organization known as A Group of Women.

== Notable members ==
- Abby Scott Baker
- Alice Paul
- Belle Case La Follette
- Caroline E. Spencer
- Crystal Eastman
- Dora Lewis
- Doris Stevens
- Dorothy Day
- Helen Keller
- Mabel Vernon
- Mary Beard
- Lawrence Lewis
- Lucy G. Branham
- Lucy Burns
- Mary A. Nolan
- Mary Hunter Austin
- Mary Ritter Beard
- Maria Montessori
- Matilda Young
- Nina Samarodin
- Olympia Brown
- Rose Winslow
- Sue Sheldon White

== See also ==
- List of suffragists and suffragettes
- Timeline of women's suffrage
- Women's suffrage organizations
