= Jane Norman Smith =

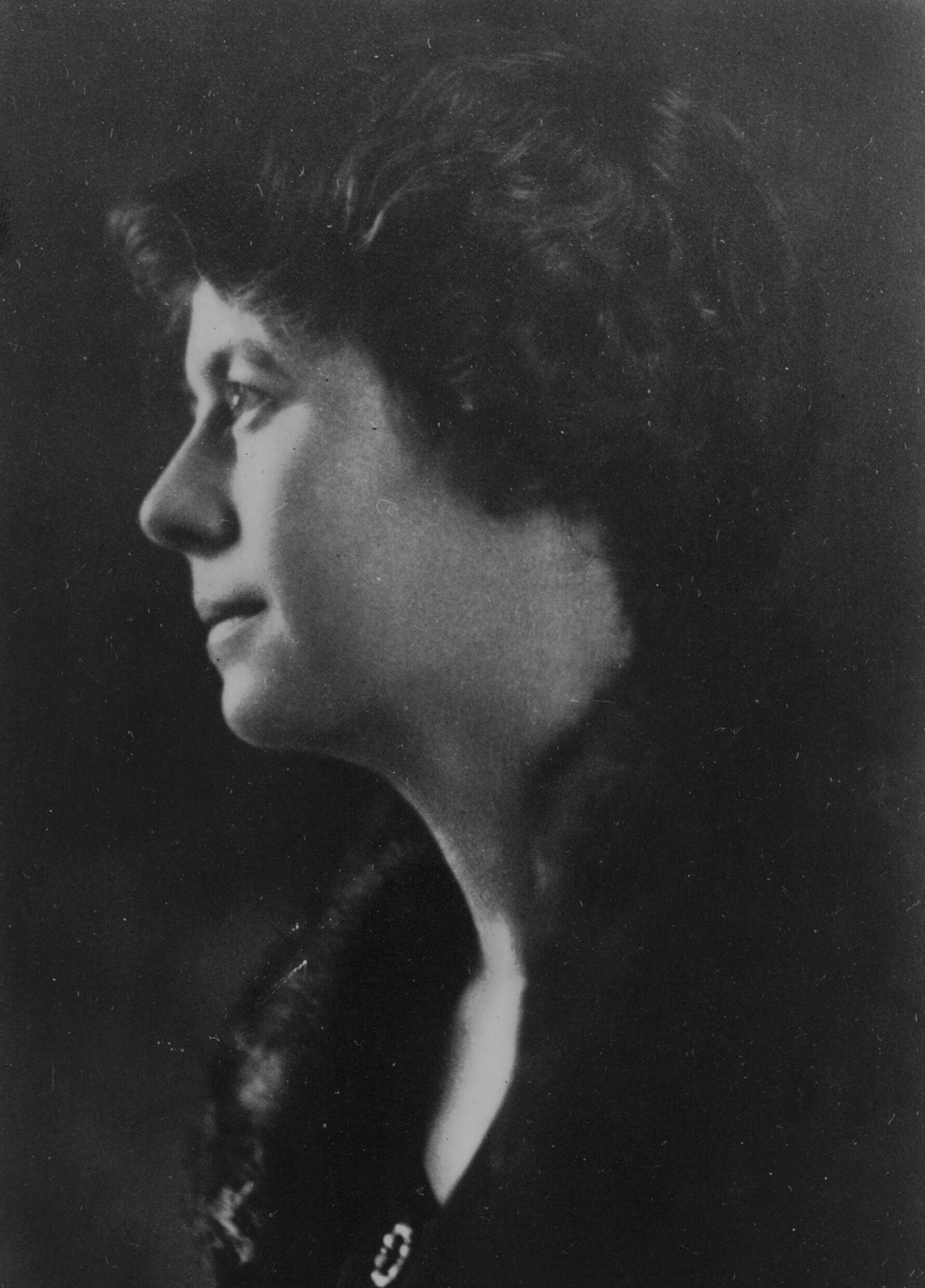
- Born: Jane Norman; 1874; New Jersey
- Died: September 3, 1953 (aged 78–79); Windsor, Vermont
- Other names: Mrs. Clarence Smith

Jane Norman Smith (1874–1953) was an American suffragist and reformer.

Smith née Norman was born in 1874 in New Jersey. She married Clarence Meserole Smith with whom she had 2 children. Smith was active in the National Woman's Party before the passage of the Nineteenth Amendment in 1919. She remained with the organization as it turned its attention to protective laws and labor issues. In 1926 Smith was appointed by New York State governor Alfred E. Smith to represent the state at the 10th Conference of the International Woman Suffrage Alliance held in Paris, France. Smith was chairman of the National Woman's Party from 1927 to 1929. Smith was vocal about women's representation and equal wages, being quoted or writing for The New York Times.

Smith supported the Equal Rights Amendment and in 1945 filed a statement with the House Judiciary Committee urging the amendment be ratified.

Smith died on September 3, 1953, in Windsor, Vermont. Her papers are in the Schlesinger Library.
