= Genevieve Allen =

American suffragist (1881–1938)

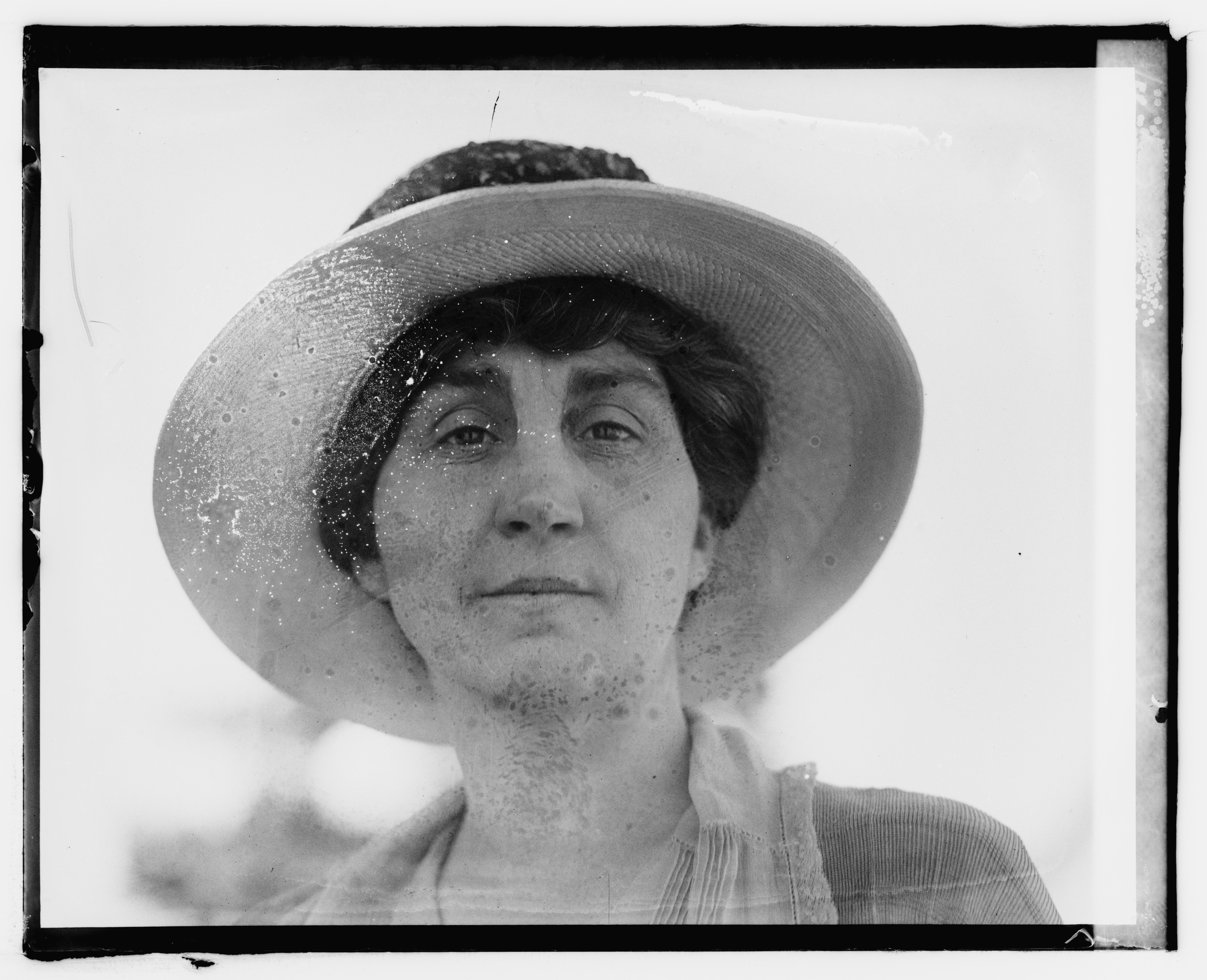
Genevieve Allen

Genevieve Allen (1881–1938) was an American suffragist, one of the pioneer suffrage workers of the state of California. She was the legislative head of the California branch of the National Woman's Party. She worked with Alice Paul, one of the founders of the National Woman's Party, and other important activists for women's suffrage and political rights in United States.

== Biography ==
Born in 1881 in Connecticut, United States, Genevieve Allen was the daughter of John Allen and Margaret. She completed her higher education from Stanford University from 1902 to 1905. In most part of her life, she lived in San Francisco, from where she worked for women's suffrage in California. She was the executive secretary of the San Francisco Center of the California Civic League of Women Voters. In 1911, she was elected as the secretary of the College Equal Suffrage League of Northern California, where she also served as the head of its advertising committee.

While serving as the legislative head of the California branch of the National Woman's Party, on June 22, 1920, she contacted Senator Warren G. Harding, who was nominated as the presidential candidate of the Republican Party, to support the suffrage cause. In March 1933, she also wrote to William I. Traeger, member of the House of Representatives from California, asking him to support a legislation in eliminating the discrimination of women with regard to citizenship. she also worked in addressing a discriminatory clause in the Cable Act.

She married Alexander Allen, a journalist from California.

She died in 1938 at the age of 57.
