= Sarah Tarleton Colvin =

American nurse and women's rights advocate

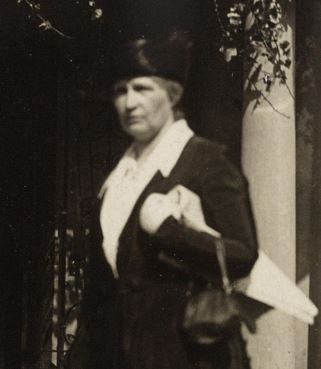
- Born: Sarah Lightfoot Tarleton; September 12, 1865; Greene County, Alabama
- Died: April 22, 1949 (aged 83); Roseville, Ramsey County, Minnesota
- Other names: Sarah Lightfoot Colvin, Sarah T. Colvin
- Occupations: Nurse, suffragist
- Years active: 1892–1944

Sarah Tarleton Colvin (September 12, 1865 – April 22, 1949) was an American nurse and women's rights advocate who served as the national president of the National Woman's Party in 1933. Jailed for her activism while picketing the White House in 1918 and 1919, Colvin later wrote her autobiography about the suffrage movement and her nursing career.

== Early life ==
Sarah Lightfoot Tarleton was born on September 12, 1865, in Greene County, Alabama, as the oldest child of Sallie Bernard (née Lightfoot) and Robert Tarleton. Her father was a physician, having graduated from Yale University and served in the Confederate Army during the Civil War. Her mother was descended of Lieutenant Philip Lightfoot, who served in Harrison's Continental Artillery Regiment of Virginia, during the American Revolution. When the war concluded, the family resided with Tarlton's paternal grandparents in Caddo Parish, Louisiana, where her brother, Robert Jr. was born. The family then moved to Mobile, Alabama, where her father died when Tarlton was three years old, from complications of his war service. Her sister Margaret was born the day after her father's death in 1868.

After their father's death, the family moved often, living in various places in Alabama, Louisiana and Mississippi before settling in Baltimore, Maryland, in 1878. After her debut and a lengthy trip abroad, Tarleton enrolled in nursing school at Johns Hopkins School of Nursing, graduating in 1892, after a two year course.

== Career ==
After completing her education and over her family's objections, Tarleton accepted the position as head nurse at Johns Hopkins for six months. She then worked briefly as a private duty nurse in New York City, before moving to Montreal, Canada to take a position at the Royal Victoria Hospital as an operating-room nurse. While in Montreal, she met Dr. Alexander R. Colvin, whom she married in Baltimore on June 1, 1897. After their wedding, the couple settled in Saint Paul, Minnesota.

Because continuing to work as a nurse after her marriage was considered improper, Colvin turned her attention to improving the educational standards of women in nursing. She worked on the board of the Deaconess Home from their arrival in 1897 and in 1906 was chosen as the founding president of the Minnesota State Graduate Nurses' Association. She also worked for other civic clubs, including serving as a director for the Civic League, as a founding member of the YWCA and as the president of the Anti-Tuberculosis Society. In 1915, she was one of the founders of the National Woman's Party, Minnesota branch, and served as its chair through 1920.

Colvin became one of the leading women's rights advocates in Minnesota and worked as a national organizer, traveling to other areas, like Kansas and Washington, D. C. to press for women's suffrage and birth control, which at the time was illegal in Minnesota. Simultaneously during World War I, she served as a Red Cross and army nurse. Given the rank of major, she was the Acting Surgical Chief of Nursing at Fort McHenry. As a member of the Silent Sentinels she participated in the White House pickets in 1918 and in January 1919 was arrested twice. Colvin described her imprisonment as both fearful and revolting, but after the first term, she participated in a hunger strike, which led to her second sentence.

When the war ended, Colvin joined both the disarmament movement and the Women's International League for Peace and Freedom (WILPF), serving on the board of the Minneapolis Branch of the WILPF. Once women secured the vote, she joined the Minnesota Farmer–Labor Party, working to educate people on the issues and press for passage of the Equal Rights Amendment. In 1933, she was elected as the national president of the National Woman's Party and turned her sights toward issues of equal pay. She was elected to serve on the state Board of Education in 1935 and continued to press for nursing reforms and pay equality for both American and Canadian nurses through the end of the 1930s. In 1944, she published her autobiography, A Rebel in Thought, relating her experiences in the suffrage movement.

== Death and legacy ==
Colvin died on April 22, 1949, in Ramsey, Minnesota. She has been featured as one of the biographies of the Turning Point Suffragist Memorial Association and is honored on the Minnesota Woman Suffrage Memorial.
