= Maud Younger =

American suffragist, feminist, and labor activist

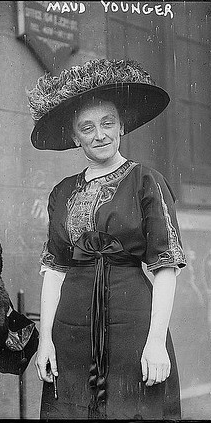
- Maud Younger, c. 1910–15.
- Born: January 10, 1870; San Francisco, California
- Died: June 25, 1936 (aged 66); Los Gatos, California
- Known for: Suffragist, Labor activist

Maud Younger (January 10, 1870 – June 25, 1936) was an American suffragist, feminist, and labor activist.

== Early life ==
Maud Younger was born in San Francisco, California, the daughter of a Scottish immigrant, dentist William John Younger. Her mother Anna Maria Lane, an heiress, died when Maud was twelve years old. It was a prosperous, well-connected family; two of her sisters married Austrian barons, and her father moved to Paris in 1900. Maud Younger was educated in San Francisco and New York. At 31, she visited the New York College Settlement House, and began her work in activism. "I went to see it, stopped for a week, and stayed five years," she recalled.

== Labor activism ==
Younger took up the cause of working women. She took several waitressing jobs to investigate working conditions in restaurants, and joined the New York Waitresses' Union. She was referred to as ''the millionaire waitress." After the 1906 San Francisco earthquake, Younger went back to her hometown to pursue further work in labor organizing. She worked as a waitress to qualify for union membership, then organized the city's first Waitresses' Union. She was president of Waitresses' Union Local 48, and served as their delegate to the San Francisco Central Labor Council. Younger also helped found the San Francisco Wage Earners' Suffrage League (WESL) in 1908, to ensure that the concerns of working women were not forgotten in pursuit of the vote. After California women won suffrage in 1911, Younger and the WESL worked for the eight-hour workday for women. Younger funded many of the legal aspects of this work, and was an impressive public face of the movement as well. At the 1911 Labor Day parade in San Francisco, she drove the WESL float, a wagon pulled by six white horses.

== Suffrage activism ==
Younger traveled to New York to support striking garment workers in 1913, and happened to be in town to give a memorial keynote speech at the 1916 funeral of Inez Milholland Boissevain. She supported the suffrage movement in Nevada and in the South (her mother was from New Orleans), and joined the Congressional Union, the more militant suffrage organization headed by Alice Paul, later named the National Woman's Party. Younger served as chair of the lobbying committee and participated in NWP pickets at the White House demanding women's suffrage.

== Later work ==
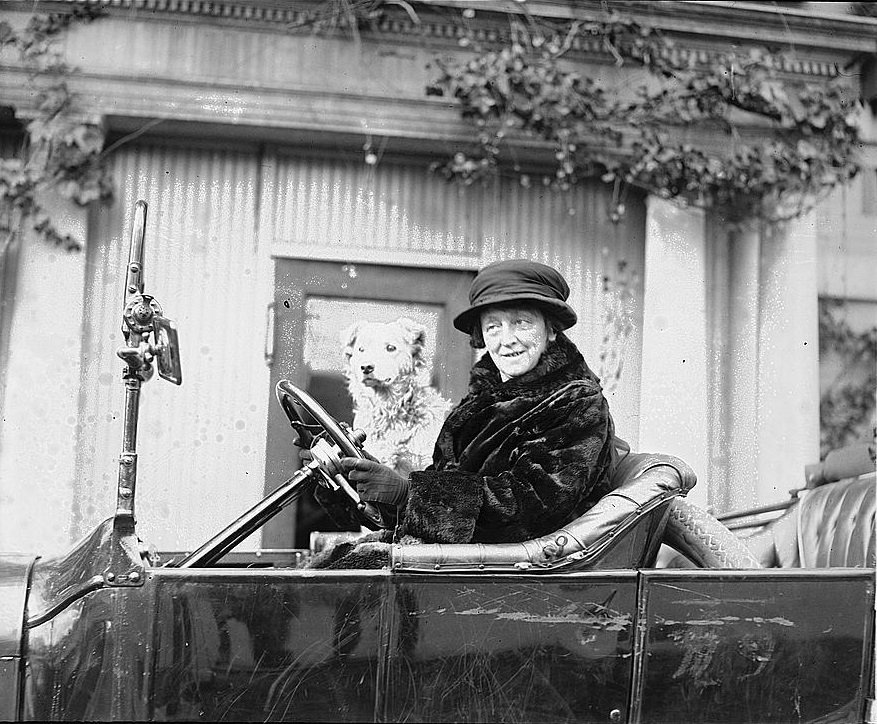
December 16, 1920

In late 1920, Maud Younger drove across the country alone, with a dog named Sandy; this trip made her one of the first women to do a solo coast-to-coast drive across America, the very first being Anita King. The trip from San Francisco to Washington DC took 38 days, hampered by excessive rain. She arrived in Washington on 20 December 1920. After the ratification of the Nineteenth Amendment secured the right to vote for American women, Younger (and others) turned to advocating for the Equal Rights Amendment. Younger died from cancer in Los Gatos, California, in 1936, age 66. Her unpublished autobiography is in the National Woman's Party Papers, at the Library of Congress.
