= 10th Conference of the International Woman Suffrage Alliance =

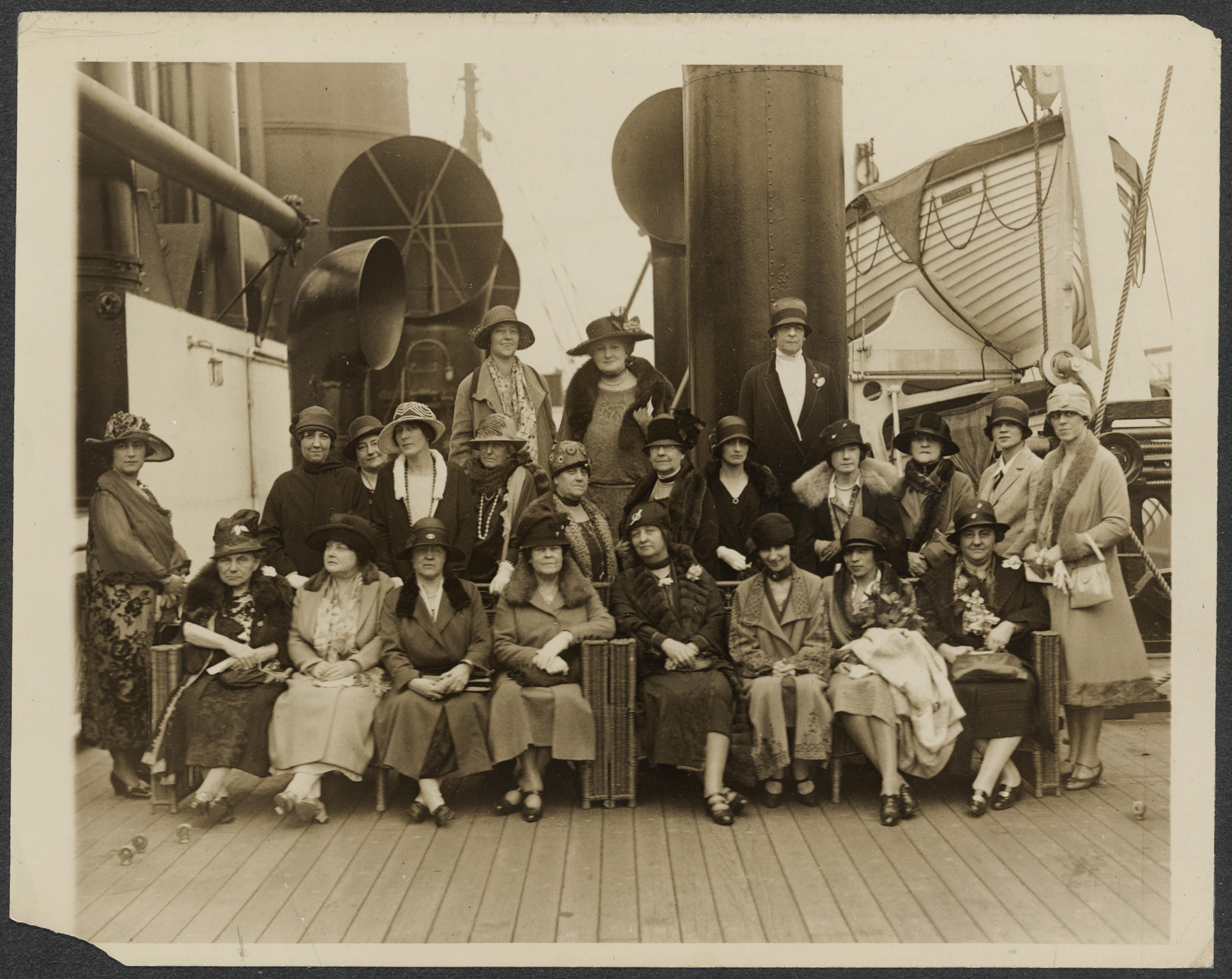
National Women's Party delegation en route to Paris

The 10th Conference of the International Woman Suffrage Alliance was an international women's conference, which took place in Paris in France in May 30 to June 6, 1926. It was the tenth international conference which was arranged under the International Alliance of Women.

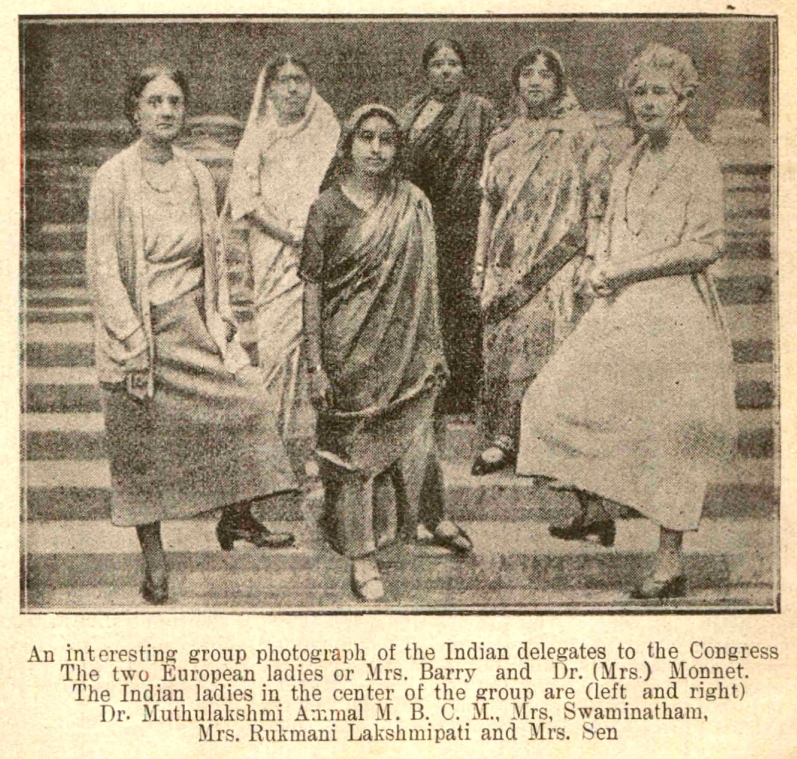
Indian and European delegates

The conference was held in the Sorbonne in Paris and was presided over for the first time by Margery Corbett Ashby, the International Alliance of Women's second President. President Ashby stated in her speech that the women's movement existed in every country whose principles built upon the concepts of peace, freedom, and liberty, and that its goal was justice, international harmony, and peace. This introduction of international peace as a core value was also made by the International Alliance of Women's first President, Carrie Chapman Catt. Though absent from this convening, her letter to its participants declared standing in unity for the peace of nations to be the highest duty of women after obtaining their right to vote. As a result, a corresponding 6th committee for Peace and the United Nations was created, and nine women from different countries addressed 6,000 people at the Trocadero on the subject of world peace. This conference also saw the addition of a 7th committee for Women Police. Pre-existing committees included those regarding unmarried women and their children, family endowments and allowances, nationality of married women, and related themes.

The conference is known as the conference during which the International Woman Suffrage Alliance changed its name to International Women's Alliance. The conference also established relations with the League of Nations, facilitated by the Alliance's Emilie Gourd and with League of Nations conference representation from its Liaison Officer Princess Radziwill. For the third time, this convening included a dedicated evening reserved for women members of Parliaments from various countries – there were reported to be 10 such representatives at this conference, which was considered notable.

The 10th Conference of the International Woman Suffrage Alliance put emphasis on international and global feminist cooperation. This was particularly the case for the cooperation between the British and the American women's movement, a line supported by the Six Point Group and the American National Woman's Party. Delegates from this National Woman's Party traveled to Paris as a delegation to seek admission into the Alliance. Further to its theme of equality, the Alliance included both enfranchised and disenfranchised women.
