= Margaret Fay Whittemore =

American suffragist

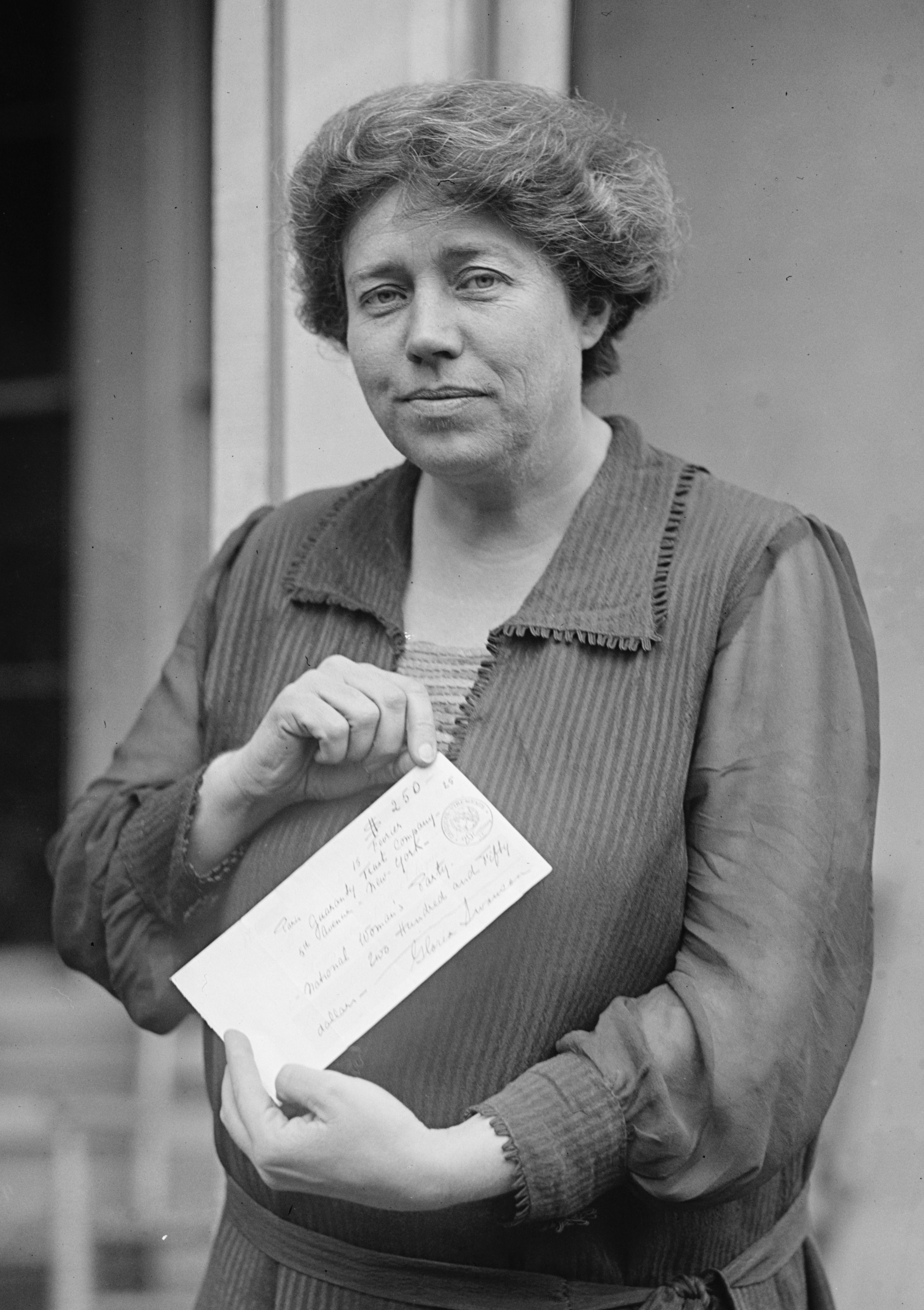
- Margaret Whittemore, 1925
- Born: May 14, 1884; Chicago, Illinois
- Died: December 2, 1937 (aged 52–53); Santa Barbara, California
- Occupation: Suffragist

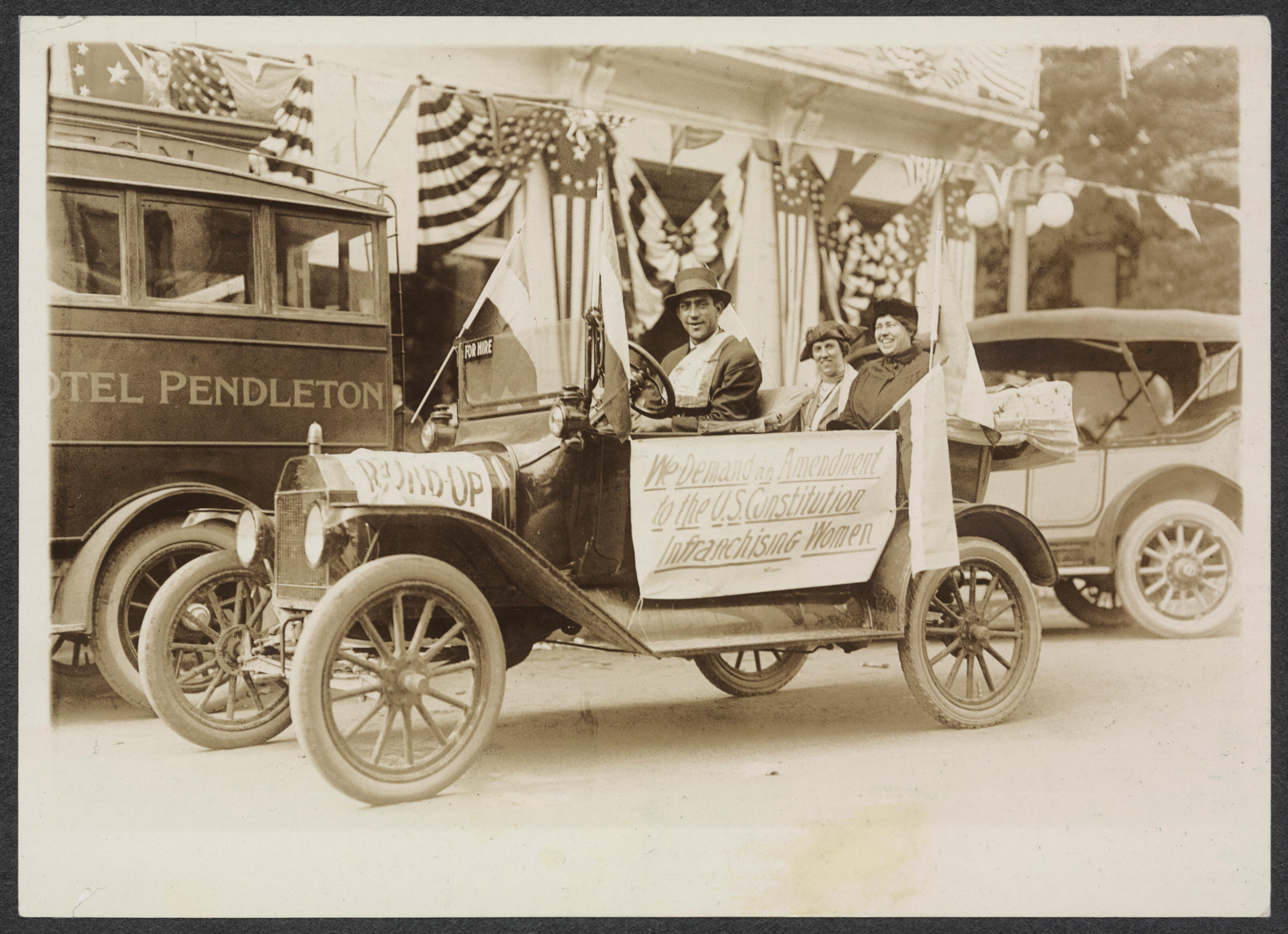
Campaign in Oregon "We Demand an Amendment to the U.S. Constitution Infranchising Women."

Margaret Fay Whittemore (1884–1937) was an American suffragist.

== Life ==
Margaret Fay Whittemore was born on May 14, 1884 in Evanston, Illinois. She was the granddaughter of Quaker Suffragist Eliza Seaman Leggett.

Whittemore was an active suffragist. In 1912 she joined the Equal Suffrage League of Wayne County. She joined the Congressional Union for Woman Suffrage (CU) in 1914 and then became a member of the National Woman's Party (NWP).

In 1915 Whittemore organized state branches of the Congressional Union in California, Michigan, and Ohio. Her sister-in-law, Marjorie Miller Whittemore, became head of the Michigan branch of the subsequent National Woman's Party.

Through the NWP Whittemore was involved in advocating for federal suffrage in the western states of Washington, Oregon, and Idaho. In 1917 she was arrested and spent three days in jail along with several other suffragists for picketing the Wilson administration in front of the White House. In 1918, she was head of the Idaho election campaign where she was unsuccessful in the campaign to persuade Idaho Senator William Borah to support the vote for the suffrage amendment.

In 1922, after women had won the right to vote, Whittemore continued her activism, specifically she and Mabel Vernon drove from Indiana to California, supporting women candidates running in the 1924 elections. In 1925, Whittemore became one of five vice-presidents of the National Woman's Party.

Whittemore died in Santa Barbara, California on 2 December 1937.

== See also ==
- List of suffragists and suffragettes
