= Sophie Gooding Rose Meredith =

American suffragist

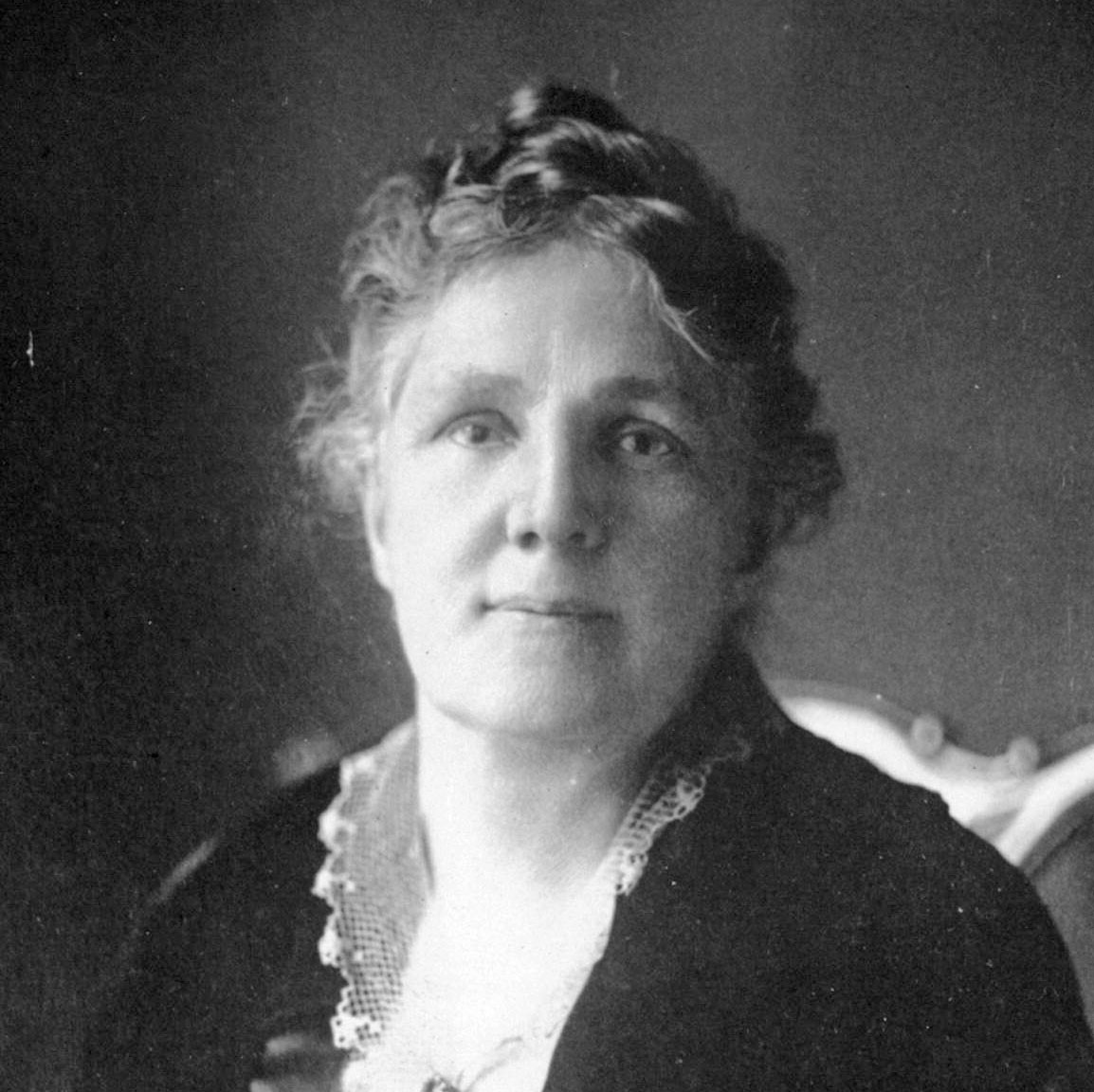
- Born: Sophie Gooding Rose; December 12, 1851; Baltimore, Maryland, U.S.
- Died: August 27, 1928 (aged 76–77); Richmond, Virginia, U.S.

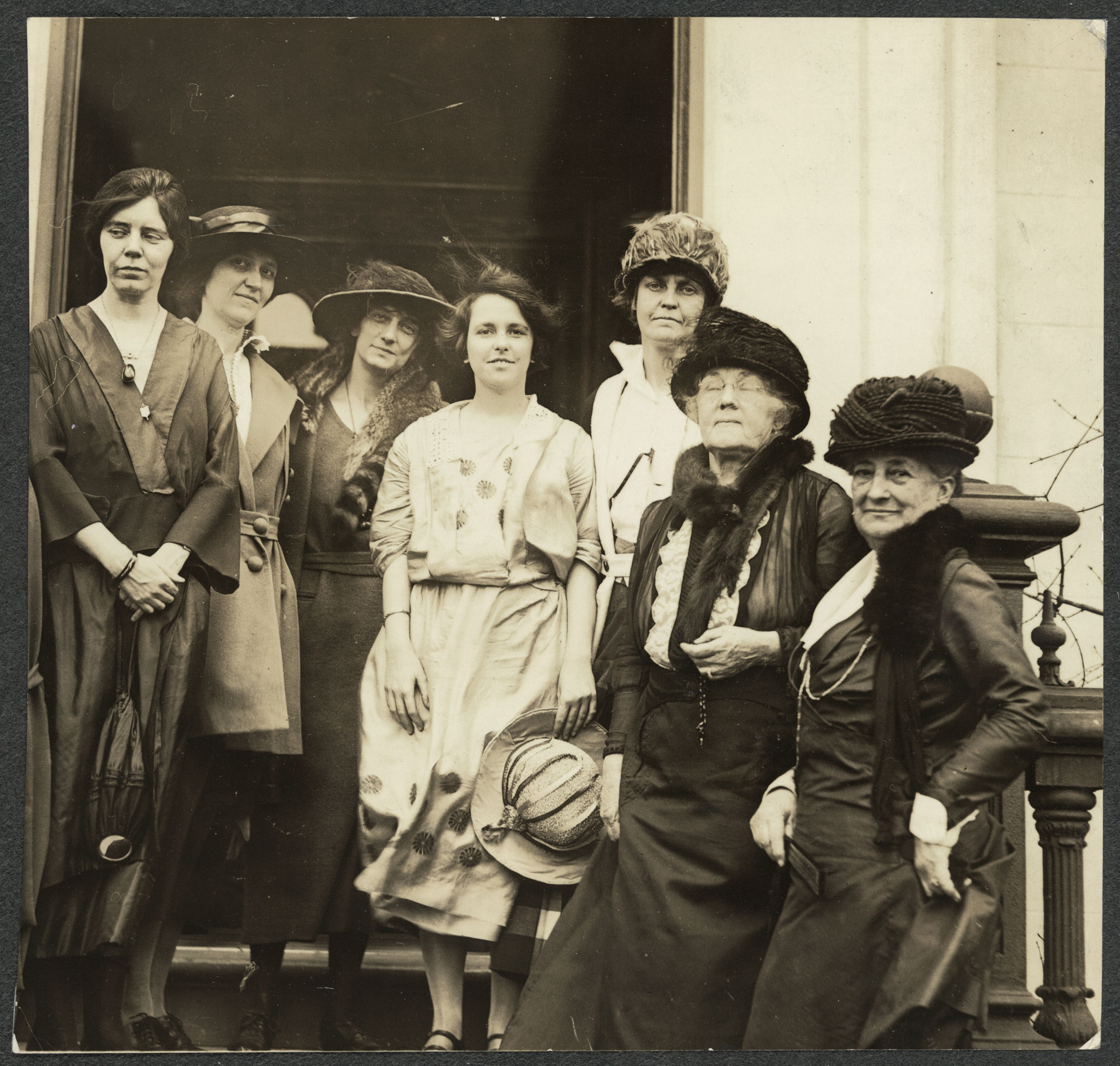
National Woman's Party meeting in Washington, D.C. May 1922 (Sophie Meredith second from right)

Sophie Gooding Rose Meredith (December 12, 1851 – August 27, 1928) was an American suffragist.

== Biography ==
Meredith née Rose was born on December 12, 1851, in Baltimore, Maryland. She had a Quaker upbringing in New Bedford, Massachusetts. She returned to Baltimore as a teenager. In 1877 she married Charles Vivian Meredith (1850 -1930) with whom she had three children. The couple settled in Richmond, Virginia.

In 1909 Meredith help establish the Equal Suffrage League of Virginia. She served in the organization, trying to achieve suffrage in the state of Virginia, until 1915 when she left work with fellow Quaker Alice Paul, an organizer behind the Congressional Union for Woman Suffrage (CU). The CU worked on achieving suffrage on a national level. Meredith established to Virginia branch of the CU.

In 1916 Meredith was chair of the Virginia branch of the CU and gave the presidential address at the annual meeting. Later that year the CU would evolve into the National Woman's Party (NWP).

In 1917 Meredith organized Virginia women's participation in picketing the White House for suffrage. The following year Meredith was arrested multiple times in Lafayette Square, across from the White House, for protesting the government's failure enacting an amendment granting voting rights to women. After the passage of the Nineteenth Amendment in 1920 Meredith continued to work with Alice Paul in promoting the passage of a federal equal rights amendment. She served as president of the Virginia branch of the NWP until her death.

Meredith died on August 27, 1928 in Richmond, Virginia. Her photograph was featured on the cover of the September 22, 1928 edition of the NWP Equal Rights bulletin.

In 2020 Meredith was honored by the Virginia Women in History, sponsored by the Library of Virginia and Virginia Foundation for Women.
