= Nell Mercer =

American suffragist (1893–1979)

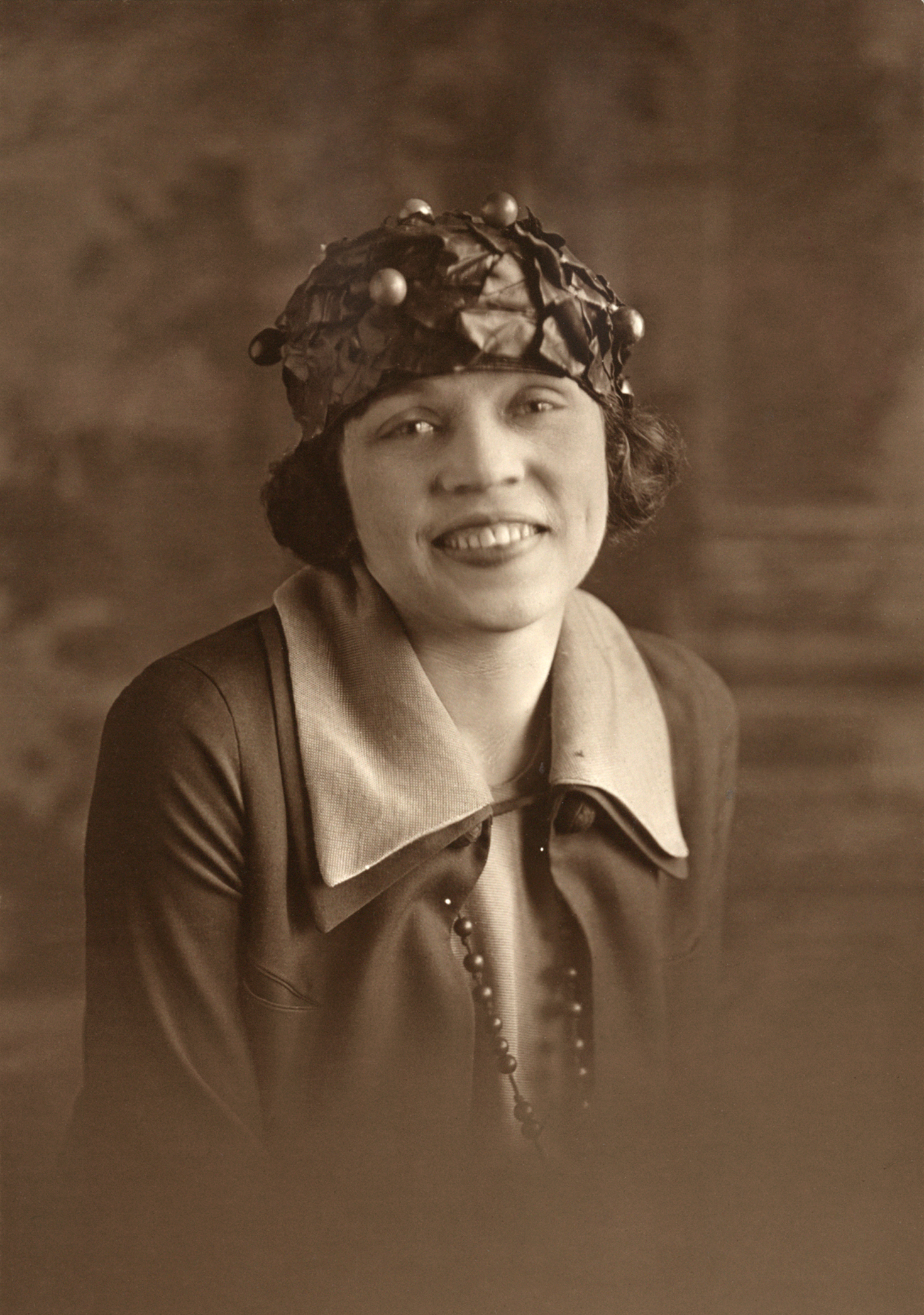
- Mercer c. 1910–1920
- Born: August 13, 1893; North Landing, Virginia, U.S.
- Died: September 30, 1979 (aged 86); Andover, Massachusetts, U.S.
- Other names: Nell K. Mercier
- Occupations: Business owner, suffragist

Nell Fidelia Mercer (August 13, 1893 – September 30, 1979) was an American suffragist. A member of the Silent Sentinels, she picketed Woodrow Wilson's White House in support of women's suffrage in the United States.

== Life ==
Mercer was born in North Landing, Virginia, on August 13, 1893. She grew up in Norfolk, Virginia, where she became a member of the Norfolk branch of the National Woman's Party.

As a member of the Silent Sentinels picketing Woodrow Wilson's White House for women's suffrage in the United States, she was arrested in February 1919 for her participation in a watchfire demonstration and sentenced to five days in jail. Mercer was honored for her sacrifices and in 1926 became a delegate to the Tenth Congress of the International Woman Suffrage Alliance in Paris, France.

In 1929, she married Clifton N. Phillips, a Great War veteran who was nine years her senior.

In addition to her activism, Mercer toured Europe for two years and, upon returning to the United States, stayed at the Brunswick Hotel in Boston's Copley Square. She would later purchase the landmark hotel and became its final owner and operator until the property was sold to IBM for their corporate headquarters. Mercer died in Andover, Massachusetts on September 30, 1979.

In 2021, it was announced that Mercer was to be the subject of a documentary by filmmaker Tara Price.

== General references ==
- Stevens, Doris (1920). Jailed for Freedom: American Women Win the Vote. New York: Boni & Liveright, Inc. p. 365. OCLC 35184666.
- "Suffragists Burn Wilson in Effigy" (PDF). New York Times. February 10, 1919.
