= Edna Buckman Kearns =

American suffrage activist

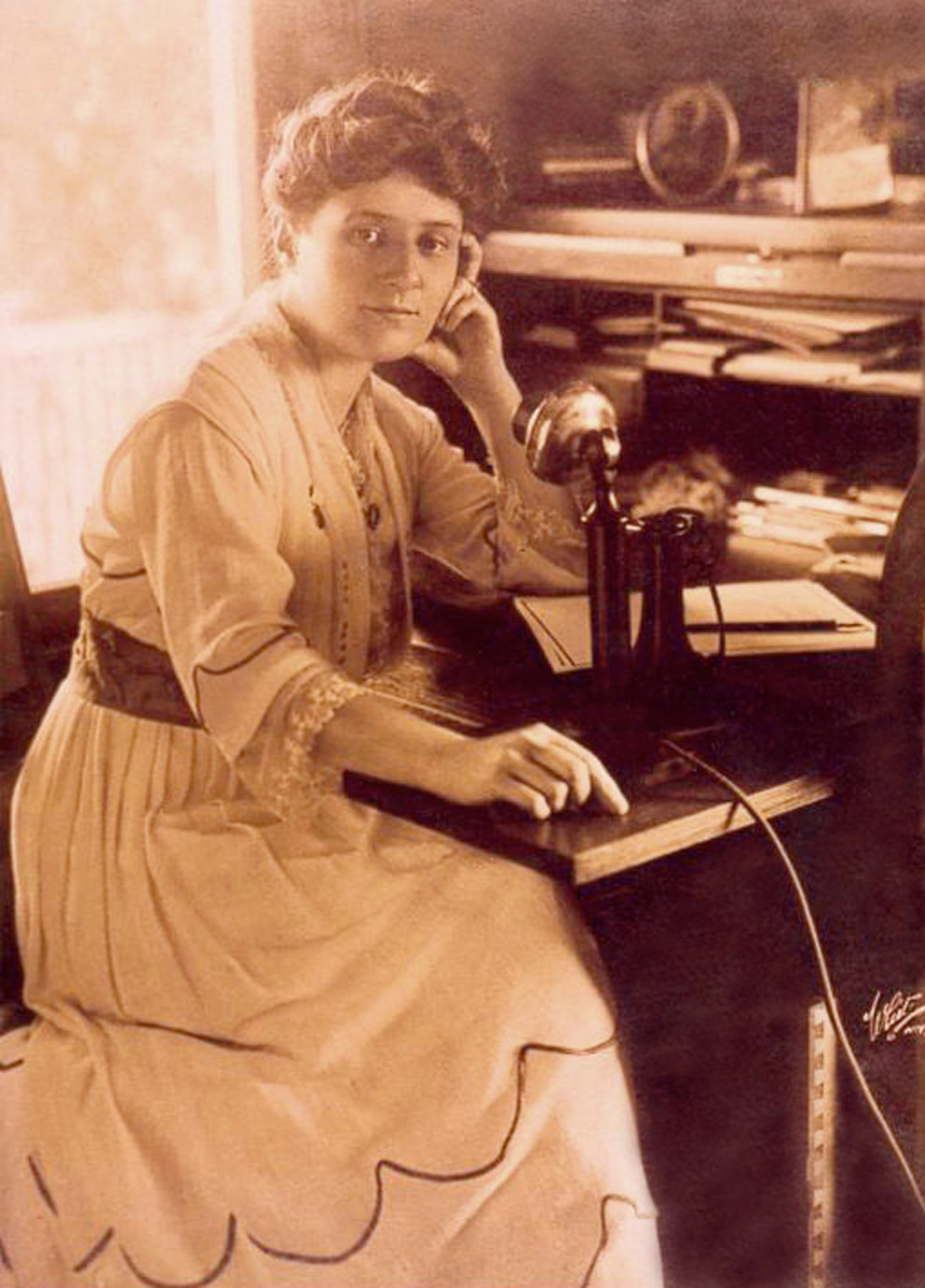
- Edna Buckman Kearns in her home office in Rockville Centre, New York, circa 1915.
- Born: Edna May Buckman; December 25, 1882; Philadelphia, PA
- Died: June 1, 1934 (aged 51)
- Resting place: Quaker cemetery in Plymouth Meeting, PA
- Education: Graduated from Friends’ Central, Philadelphia
- Occupations: Woman suffrage grassroots activist best known for barnstorming Long Island and New York City in her horse-drawn campaign wagon, the “Spirit of 1776.”
- Spouse: Wilmer Rhamstine Kearns (1882–1972)
- Children: Serena Buckman Kearns (1905–1981) and Wilma Buckman Kearns (1920–1997)
- Parent(s): May Begley Buckman (1857–1914) and Charles Harper Buckman (1857–1914)
- Website: suffragewagon.org

Edna Buckman Kearns (December 25, 1882 – June 1, 1934) was a suffrage activist who worked on the 1915 and 1917 New York campaigns for votes for women, as well as the National Woman's Party campaign for the passage and ratification of the 19th amendment to the US Constitution.

Kearns is best known for her horse-drawn suffrage campaign wagon, called the “Spirit of 1776,” that was used in New York City and Long Island suffrage parades, pageants, and special organizing events.

The suffrage wagon is in the collection of the New York State Museum and was exhibited at the state museum in 2010. The New York State Capitol exhibition in the Hall of the Governors, “From Seneca Falls to the Supreme Court: New York’s Women Leading the Way,” featured the “Spirit of 1776” suffrage wagon in 2012.

== Early life ==
Edna May Buckman was born to Charles Harper Buckman (1857–1914) and Mary “May” Begley (1857–1914) in Philadelphia, Pennsylvania and raised in the Germantown section of Philadelphia, as well as Plymouth Heights in Montgomery County near Norristown at Echo Dale, the Buckman family home. Edna was the oldest child; she also had a brother, Thomas Smith Buckman (1886–1959).

The Buckmans were members of the Religious Society of Friends or Quakers. Edna May Buckman graduated from Friends' Central School in Philadelphia. Edna and her family were members of Green Street Monthly Meeting, a Quaker Meeting in the Germantown section of Philadelphia. Mary or “May” Begley Buckman, Edna's mother, was a temperance activist active with the Religious Society of Friends and other organizations.

Edna was in the ninth generation of Buckmans in America whose ancestors immigrated to Philadelphia with William Penn on the ship Welcome in 1682. The Buckmans were the largest family group on the Welcome. The first generation of Buckmans in the Pennsylvania colony purchased land and farmed in Bucks County. Over the years, Buckman family members also lived in Montgomery County, as well as Philadelphia.

== Marriage and move to New York ==
On June 8, 1904 Edna May Buckman married Wilmer Rhamstine Kearns (1882–1972) in a Quaker ceremony at Echo Dale. They moved to New York City where Wilmer Kearns was employed in the accounting office of T.J. Dunn. Their first child, Serena Buckman Kearns, was born in August 1905. After Serena Kearns was old enough to attend Friends Seminary in New York City, Edna Kearns became active in the suffrage movement. The family purchased a home at 29 Waterview Road in Rockville Centre, NY about 1907 and lived between Rockville Centre and New York City where Serena attended school and Wilmer was employed. Edna divided her time organizing for the vote between New York City and Long Island.

== Activism ==
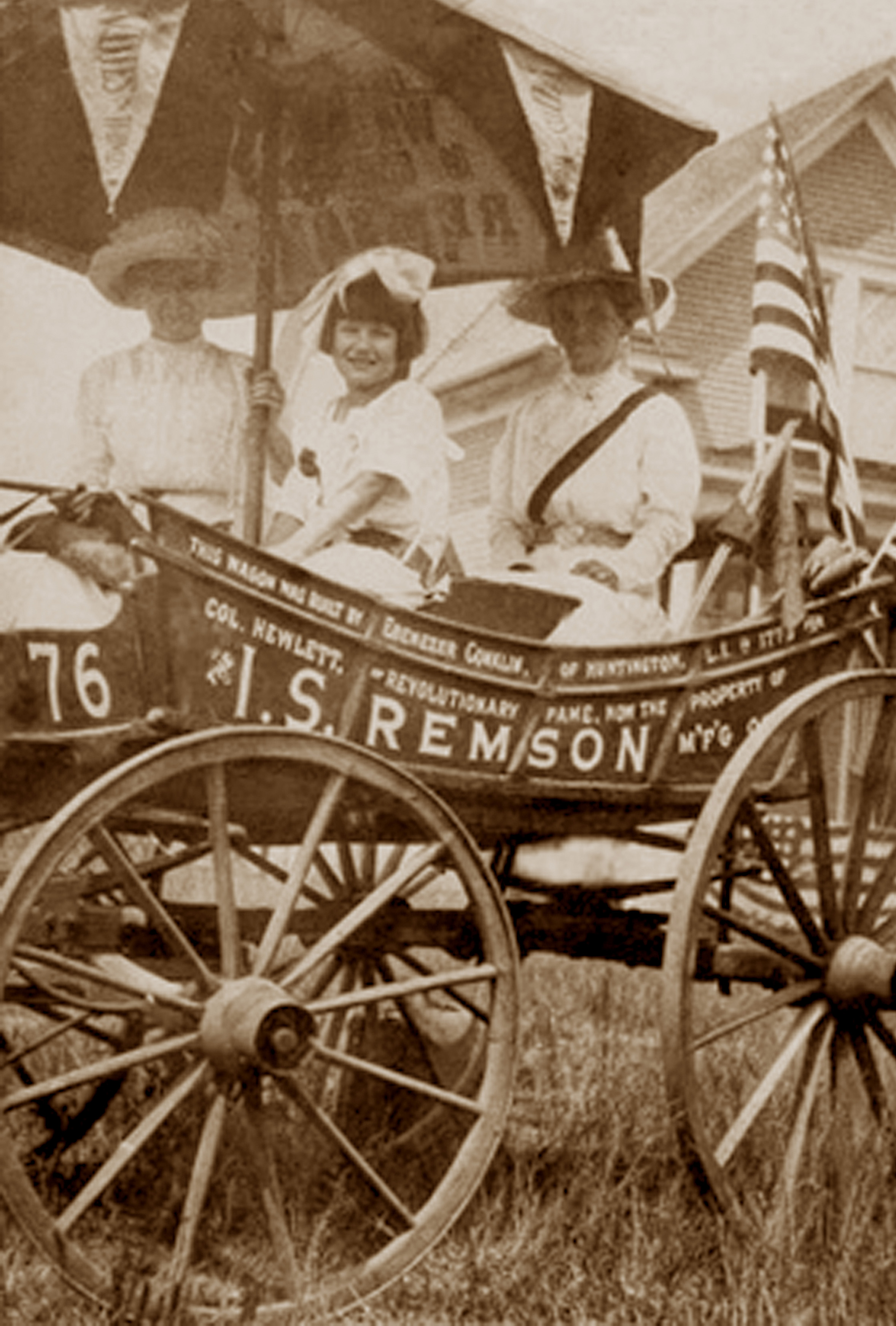
Edna Kearns (left) with the horse-drawn suffrage wagon, the “Spirit of 1776,” on its maiden voyage from Manhattan to Long Island in July 1913. Also in wagon: Serena Kearns (center) and Irene Davison (right).

In 1913, the Brooklyn carriage company, I.S. Remson, donated an old wagon called the “Spirit of 1776” to the New York State Woman Suffrage Association. State suffrage association president Harriet May Mills assigned the vehicle to Edna Buckman Kearns for use in Long Island suffrage organizing. The wagon's presentation ceremony was held in July 1913, an event that was covered by the city's newspapers, including the New York Times. Kearns held leadership roles in Nassau and Suffolk County suffrage clubs. She became a suffrage columnist and editor for the Brooklyn Daily Eagle starting about 1911 and served the suffrage movement in many capacities, including writer, editor, and press contact for local, state, and national campaigns. She wrote under the bylines Edna Buckman Kearns or Mrs. W.R. Kearns.

Edna Kearns took her daughter Serena Kearns with her on trips using the “Spirit of 1776” horse-drawn wagon, and little Serena became a poster child for the suffrage movement. Wilmer Kearns marched in the men's divisions of New York City and Washington, DC Votes for Women parades. Edna Kearns served as Congressional representative for Alice Paul and the National Woman's Party on Long Island during the campaigns for the passage and ratification of the Nineteenth amendment.

Kearns also contributed her reporting and editorial skills to New York Yearly Meeting from 1913 to 1917 as Publicity Committee member and chair where she served a press contact for the Quaker annual gathering in New York City to conduct business. Edna Kearns urged newspaper reporters to avoid publicizing misconceptions about the religious organization. The Quaker Oats Company was not founded by Quakers, Kearns argued, and it cashed in on the Quakers’ reputation for honesty in business dealings. Many members of the Religious Society of Friends opposed the Quaker branding for oatmeal and other commercial products not endorsed by the religious body.

Over the years Edna Kearns worked with many suffrage activists on Long Island, including Rosalie Jones, Ida Sammis, Ida Craft, Elisabeth Freeman, Alva Belmont, Irene Davison, and many others. Edna Buckman Kearns was active in peace organizations prior to and during World War I, including the Woman's Peace Party. She served on the board of the Women's International League for Peace and Freedom until 1919.

== Later life ==
In 1920 Wilmer and Edna Kearns moved back to Echo Dale, the Buckman family home, for the birth of their second child, Wilma Buckman Kearns, who was born on November 12, 1920. Wilma's birth placed her in the first generation of American girls and women for whom voting would be a right for their entire lives. Edna's second daughter's birth date was also the birthday of Elizabeth Cady Stanton, the famous New York State women's rights activist and author of the 1848 Declaration of Sentiments. Edna and Wilmer Kearns founded a nursery known as Echo Dale Gardens that specialized in annuals and perennials that Edna's husband Wilmer R. Kearns operated until the 1950s. The nursery exhibited the suffrage wagon and educated citizens about its significance.

In 1932, Pennsylvania Governor Gifford Pinchot appointed Edna Buckman Kearns to serve on the Board of Trustees of the Mothers’ Assistance Fund of Montgomery County. Edna Kearns was also active in local Pennsylvania organizations supporting business and professional women. She died in June 1934 from cancer and is buried in the Quaker cemetery in Plymouth Meeting, Pennsylvania.

The suffrage campaign wagon was returned to New York State in 1986 to be part of an exhibit, “Edna Kearns and Elizabeth Freeman: Suffrage Foot Soldiers,” in Kingston, New York. The suffrage campaign wagon has been exhibited twice since becoming part of the New York State Museum's collection.
