= Clara Snell Wolfe =

American suffragist

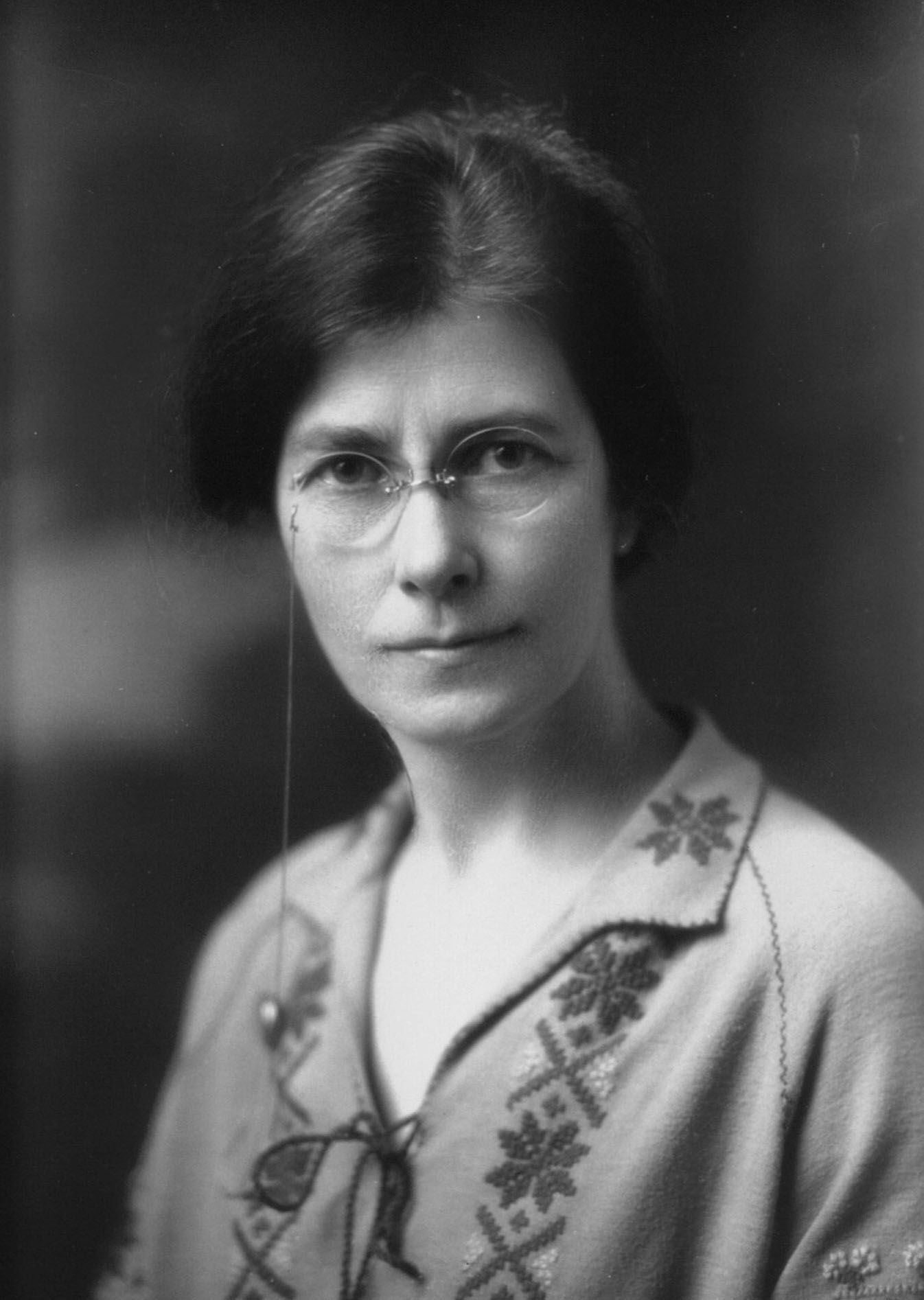
- Clara Snell Wolfe, ca. 1920
- Born: Clara M. Snell; May 9, 1874; Milledgeville, Illinois
- Died: June 12, 1970 (aged 96); Upper Arlington, Ohio
- Education: Illinois State Normal University, Oberlin College
- Occupations: Educator, Suffragist
- Spouse: Albert Benedict Wolfe (m. 1906; died in 1967)

Clara Snell Wolfe (1874–1970) was an American suffragist. She founded the Texas branch of the National Woman's Party and became its president.

== Life ==
Wolfe née Snell was born on May 9, 1874, in Milledgeville, Illinois. In 1898 she graduated from Illinois State Normal University after which she became a school administrator and teacher, first working at an Illinois high school and then in the Illinois State Normal University system. In 1906 she married Albert Benedict Wolfe and the couple settled in Ohio.

In Ohio Wolfe attended Oberlin College where her husband worked as a teacher. She graduated in 1909, and continued her education at Ohio State University College and the University of California.

Wolfe was an active suffragist and clubwoman. She was a member of the Ohio Woman Suffrage Association where she served as the Recording Secretary from 1905 through 1909. She was also a member of the Ohio Federation of Women's Clubs, where she worked on the Ohio suffrage campaign of 1912.

Around 1914 the Wolfes moved to Austin, Texas. There Clara founded the Texas branch of the National Woman's Party (NWP) and became its president.

In 1923 the Wolfes moved back to Ohio. Clara remained active in the NWP, advocating for the Equal Rights Amendment. In 1942 she was elected as Second Vice Chairman of the NWP and in 1949 she was the Executive Council Vice Chairman.

Wolfe died on June 12, 1970, in Upper Arlington, Ohio.

== See also ==
- List of suffragists and suffragettes
