= Agnes E. Wells =

American mathematician and activist (1876–1959)

Agnes Ermina Wells
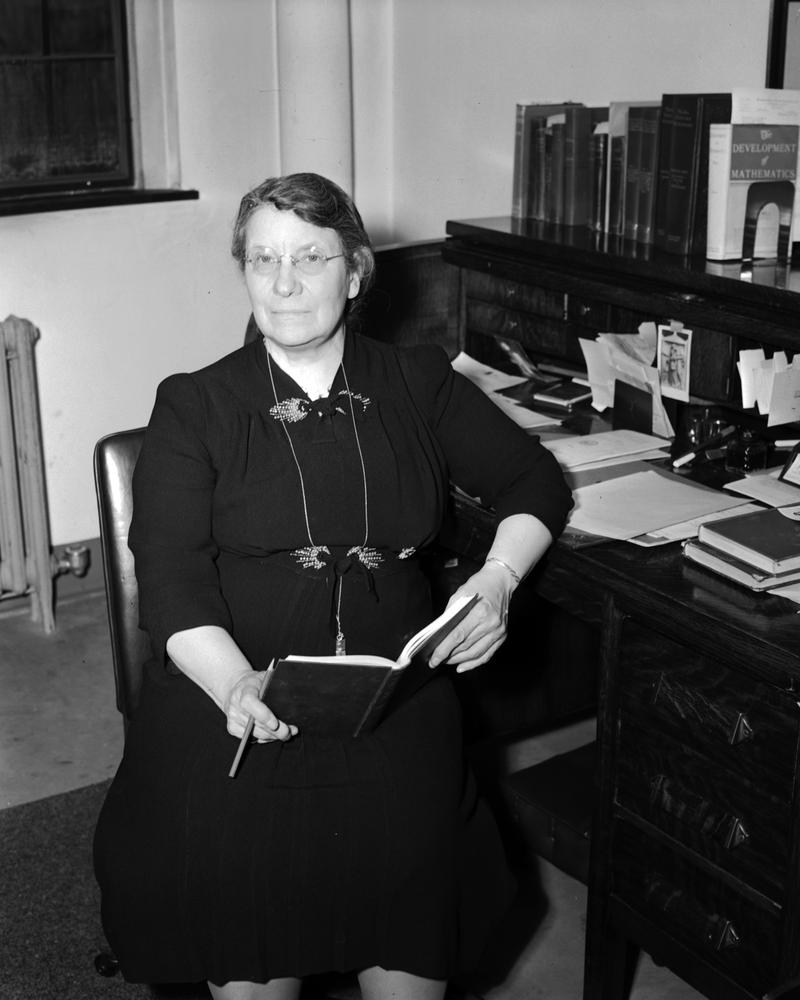
- Born: January 4, 1876; Saginaw, Michigan
- Died: July 7, 1959 (aged 83); Saginaw, Michigan
- Education: University of Michigan (BA, PhD); Carleton College (MA)
- Known for: Women's Rights Advocacy
- Scientific career
- Fields: Astronomy
- Workplaces: University of Michigan
- Doctoral advisor: Ralph Hamilton Curtiss

Agnes Ermina Wells, Ph.D. (January 4, 1876 – July 6, 1959) was an American educator and a women's equal rights movement activist. She was Dean of Women at Indiana University and professor of mathematics and astronomy there.

== Early life and education ==
Wells was born in Saginaw, Michigan, on January 4, 1876, to Edgar S. and Julia H. Comstock Wells. She had a sister named Florence and a brother named Ben.

She attended the Arthur Hill High School and she then spent one year at the Saginaw County Training School for Teachers. Wells spent another year in Dresden, Germany, where she studied the German language and music. She studied at Bryn Mawr College before transferring to the University of Michigan, where she studied mathematics and graduated in 1903 with a Bachelor of Arts. In 1916, she earned her Master of Arts degree from Carleton College in Minnesota, where her field of study was astronomy. After completing her dissertation under the Detroit Observatory's Director Ralph Hamilton Curtiss on A Study of the Relative Proper Motions and Radial Velocities of Stars in the Pleiades Group, she received her Ph.D. in astronomy from the University of Michigan in 1924.

== Career ==
Wells first worked as an educator in Crystal Falls in the Upper Peninsula of Michigan, where she was a high school principal for the 1904 to 1905 school year. From 1905 to 1906, she became a teacher of Mathematics at Duluth High School in Minnesota. Then, from 1907 to 1914, she was the head of the mathematics department. While working on her master's degree, she was an instructor at Carleton College.

In 1917, she was a faculty member and during the summers she was dean of women at the University of Michigan in Ann Arbor. At the Helen Newberry Residence, she was the social director. She then went to Indiana University and taught mathematics and was the dean of women beginning in 1919. Wells provided guidance to female students and assisted with them housing, as well as being credited with establishing the dormitory system at the school. In 1924, she became a member of the Indiana Academy of Science, and that year also began to teach astronomy courses. She retired as the dean of women in 1938, and she taught mathematics and astronomy at the university from that point until 1944. The Agnes E. Wells quadrangle at Indiana University comprises four buildings: Morrison Hall, Sycamore Hall, Memorial Hall, and Goodbody Hall, all built between 1925 and 1940.

For the American Association of University Women, she established a fellowship fund in the amount of $1 million.

Wells was active in many clubs and organizations. She helped found chapters of the Mortar Board for senior women at both University of Michigan and Indiana University. She was a member American Association of Deans of Women, Sigma Xi, Gamma Phi Beta, Pi Lambda Theta, Michigan State Society, National Education Association, Daughters of the American Revolution, National Society of the Daughters of the War of 1812, American Association of University Professors, the National Education Association, Indiana School Women's Club, and Phi Beta Kappa.

Notable leadership positions she held were chairman of the National Woman's Party, president of the Michigan Society, president of the American Association of Deans of Women, first vice president of the American Association of University Professors, state president and national vice president of the American Association of University Women, and president of the Indiana State Federation of Business and Professional Women.

Alongside her numerous avocations and activities, other hobbies she enjoyed included motoring and travel. She spent her summers in the Adirondacks in Upper Jay, Essex Country, New York, where she was the president of the Essex Country Garden Club.

== Women's rights ==
She was a member of the National Woman's Party, and became its chair in 1949. The organization worked for the right for women to vote via the Nineteenth Amendment to the Constitution and for the Equal Rights Amendment, which Wells spoke about to the subcommittee on Constitutional Amendments of Congress in 1945.

Under Wells' authority, the National Woman's Party fought for a revision of the Nineteenth Constitutional Amendment. This revision was that “Equality of rights under the law shall not be denied or abridged by the United States or by any state on account of sex. Congress and the several states shall have power, within their respective jurisdictions, to enforce this article by appropriate legislation”. This constitutional amendment to guarantee equal rights was deemed unsuccessful in 1950 when, despite receiving a two-thirds favorable vote in the senate (65–19), was unable to reach the House of Representatives and receive ratification.

In her acceptance speech as the new chairman of the National Woman's party in 1949, she described how astounded she was by the idea that few people knew about the past century's legislation that deemed women as “not persons” and, therefore, not entitled to the same rights as men. Her argument against advocates of the idea that “a woman belonged in the home” was that it overlooked the unmarried woman who, without wealth, was otherwise unable to earn her own living. In her opinion, it was time that women confronted the situations in which they were being restricted because of their sex.

In 1951, a portrait bust was presented by the American Society of Achievement Memorials for Women to the National Women's Party in Wells' honor. It now stands among other accomplished women leaders in the National Woman's Party Fine Art Collection in Washington, D.C.

== Personal life ==
She lived with a woman named Lydia Woodbridge, a teacher at Indiana University, who was identified as Well's partner in Bloomington, Indiana. Woodbridge was assistant dean of woman and a professor of French. When Wells retired as dean, Woodbridge also stepped down as assistant dean and devoted her efforts towards teaching French. Woodbridge died on July 28, 1946, in Bloomington, Indiana, at the age of 70. Soon after her death, Wells wrote in a letter to Anita Pollitzer, an acquaintance in the Party, that her “friend of 41 years and house-companion for 28 years” had just died.

In her later years, she lived with her sister Florence Wells in Saginaw, Michigan. She died there after a long illness in St. Luke's Hospital on July 7, 1959. In 1971, she was inducted into the Saginaw Hall of Fame.

== Selected published works ==
Wells, Agnes E. A Study of the Relative Proper Motions and Radial Velocities of Stars in the Pleiades Group, University of Michigan, 1924.
