= National Woman's Party =

American political party (1916–2021)

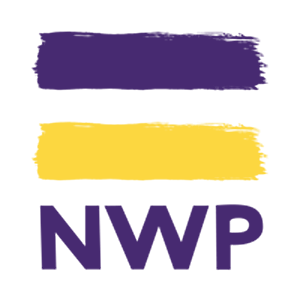
- Successor: Alice Paul Institute
- Formation: June 5, 1916; 110 years ago
- Dissolved: January 1, 2021
- Headquarters: Washington, D.C., U.S.
- Key people: Alice Paul, Lucy Burns, Mabel Vernon, Anne Henrietta Martin
- Website: https://www.alicepaul.org/
- Formerly called: Congressional Union for Woman Suffrage

The National Woman's Party (NWP) was an American women's political organization formed in 1916 to fight for women's suffrage. After achieving this goal with the 1920 adoption of the Nineteenth Amendment to the United States Constitution, the NWP advocated for other issues including the Equal Rights Amendment. The most prominent leader of the National Woman's Party was Alice Paul, and its most notable event was the 1917–1919 Silent Sentinels vigil outside the gates of the White House.

== Overview ==
The National Woman's Party was an outgrowth of the Congressional Union for Woman Suffrage, which had been formed in 1913 by Alice Paul and Lucy Burns to fight for women's suffrage. The National Woman's Party broke from the much larger National American Woman Suffrage Association, which had focused on attempting to gain women's suffrage at the state level. The NWP prioritized the passage of a constitutional amendment ensuring women's suffrage throughout the United States.

== Early history ==
Alice Paul was closely linked to England's Women's Suffrage Political Union (WSPU), organized by Emmeline Pankhurst. While a college student in England, Paul became involved with the Pankhursts and their English suffrage campaign. During this time Alice Paul met Lucy Burns, who would go on and be a co-founder of the NWP. Although Paul was closely tied to the militant suffrage campaign in England, when she left to pursue suffrage in the United States, instead Paul pioneered civil disobedience in the United States. For example, members of the WSPU heckled members of parliament, spit on police officers, and committed arson.

While the British suffragettes stopped their protests in 1914 and supported the British war effort, Paul continued her struggle for women's equality and organized picketing of a wartime president to maintain attention to the lack of enfranchisement for women. Members of the NWP argued it was hypocritical for the United States to fight a war for democracy in Europe while denying its benefits to half of the US population. Similar arguments were being made in Europe, where most of the allied nations of Europe had enfranchised some women or soon would.

After their experience with militant suffrage work in Great Britain, Alice Paul and Lucy Burns reunited in the United States in 1910. The two women originally were appointed to the Congressional Committee of the National American Woman Suffrage Association (NAWSA). In March 1913, the two women organized the first national suffrage parade of 5,000–8,000 women (by differing estimates) in Washington, D.C., on the day before Woodrow Wilson's inauguration. This was designed as a political tactic to show the strength of women and to show that they would pursue their goals under Wilson's administration. Leading the parade was Inez Milholland who wore all white and rode on a white horse, which later served as a symbol for the suffrage movement. This placement of Millholland at the start of the parade was strategic because of Mulholland's beauty, Paul knew she would attract media attention and followers. One of the criticisms of this first national suffrage parade was the barrier of women of color from participating side by side with white women. Even though Paul never opposed black women getting the right to vote, she barred them from marching with the white women and forced them to be in the back of the parade with the men to appease southern women. The parade quickly devolved into chaos due to violent reactions from the crowd and a lack of support by the local police. The D.C. police did little to help the suffragists; but the women were assisted by the Massachusetts National Guard, the Pennsylvania National Guard, and boys from the Maryland Agricultural College, who created a human barrier protecting the women from the angry crowd.

After this incident, which Paul effectively used to rally public opinion to the suffrage cause, Paul and Burns founded the Congressional Union for Woman Suffrage in April 1913, which split off from NAWSA later that year. There were many reasons for the split, but primarily Paul and Burns were frustrated with the National's slower approach of focusing on individual state referendums and wanted to pursue a congressional amendment. Alice Paul had also chafed under the leadership of Carrie Chapman Catt, as she had very different ideas of how to go about suffrage work, and a different attitude towards militancy. Catt disapproved of the radical strategies, inspired by the British "Suffragettes", Paul and Burns were trying to implement into the American Suffrage Movement.

The split was confirmed by a major difference of opinion on the Shafroth–Palmer Amendment. This amendment was spearheaded by Alice Paul's replacement as chair of the National's Congressional Committee, and was a compromise of sorts meant to appease racist sentiment in the South. Shafroth–Palmer was to be a constitutional amendment that would require any state with more than 8 percent signing an initiative petition to hold a state referendum on suffrage. This would have kept the law-making out of federal hands, a proposition more attractive to the South. Southern states feared a congressional women's suffrage amendment as a possible federal encroachment into their restrictive system of voting laws, meant to disenfranchise the black voter.

Paul and Burns felt that this amendment was a lethal distraction from the true and ultimately necessary goal of an all-encompassing federal amendment protecting the rights of all women—especially as the bruising rounds of state referendums were perceived at the time as almost damaging the cause. In Paul's words: "It is a little difficult to treat with seriousness an equivocating, evasive, childish substitute for the simple and dignified suffrage amendment now before Congress."

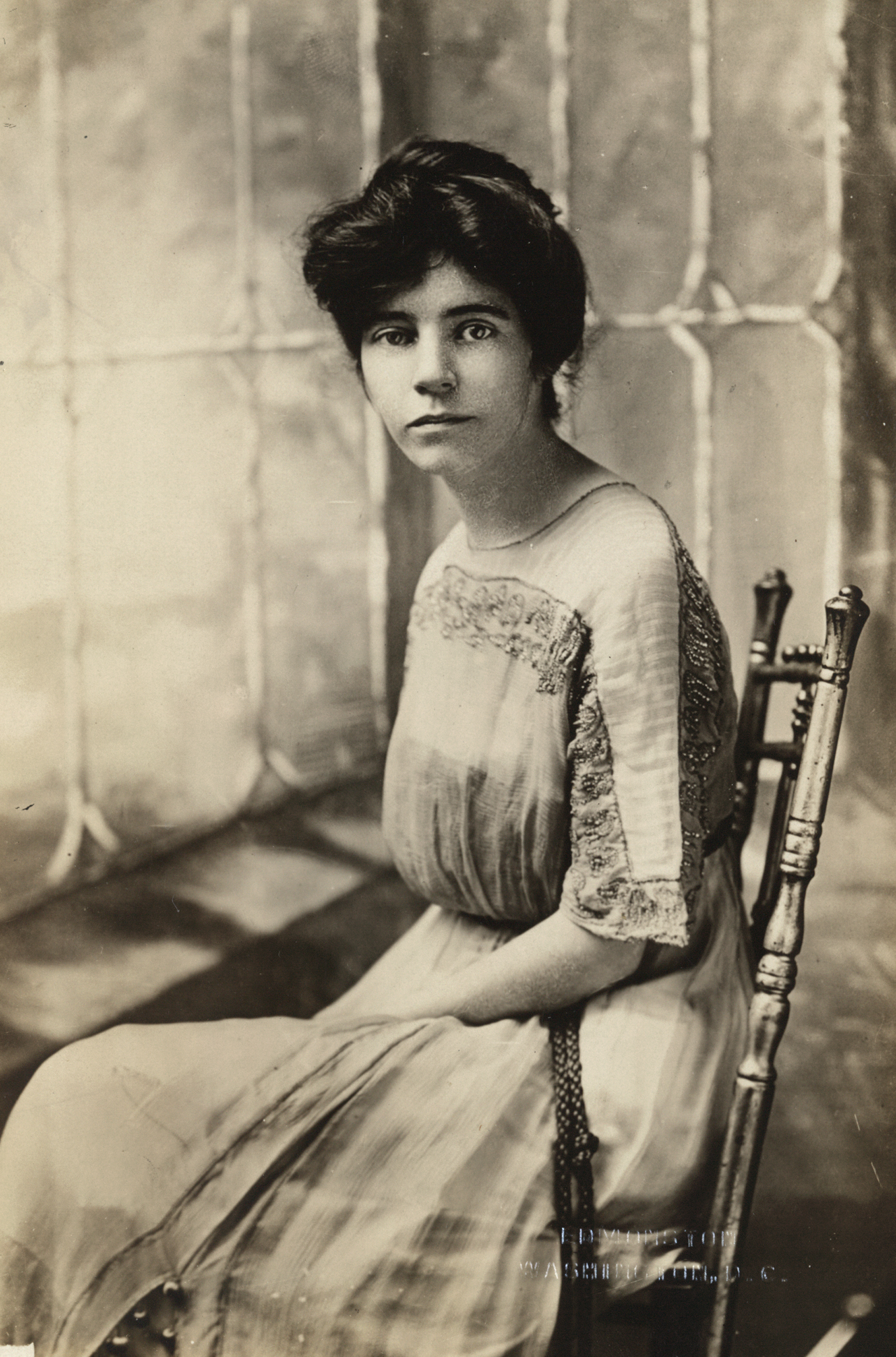
Portrait of Alice Paul, 1915

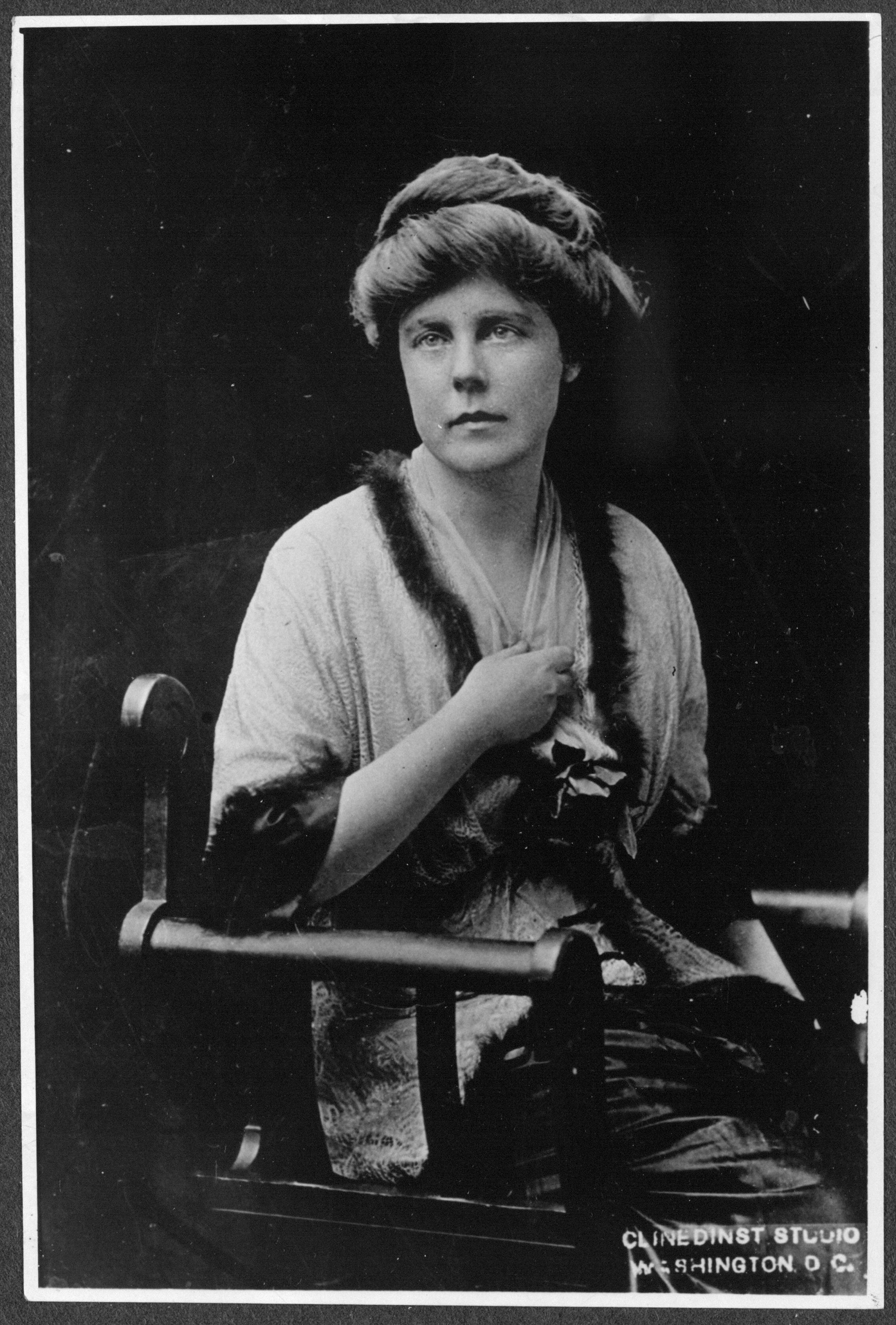
Lucy Burns, Vice Chairman Congressional Union, 1913

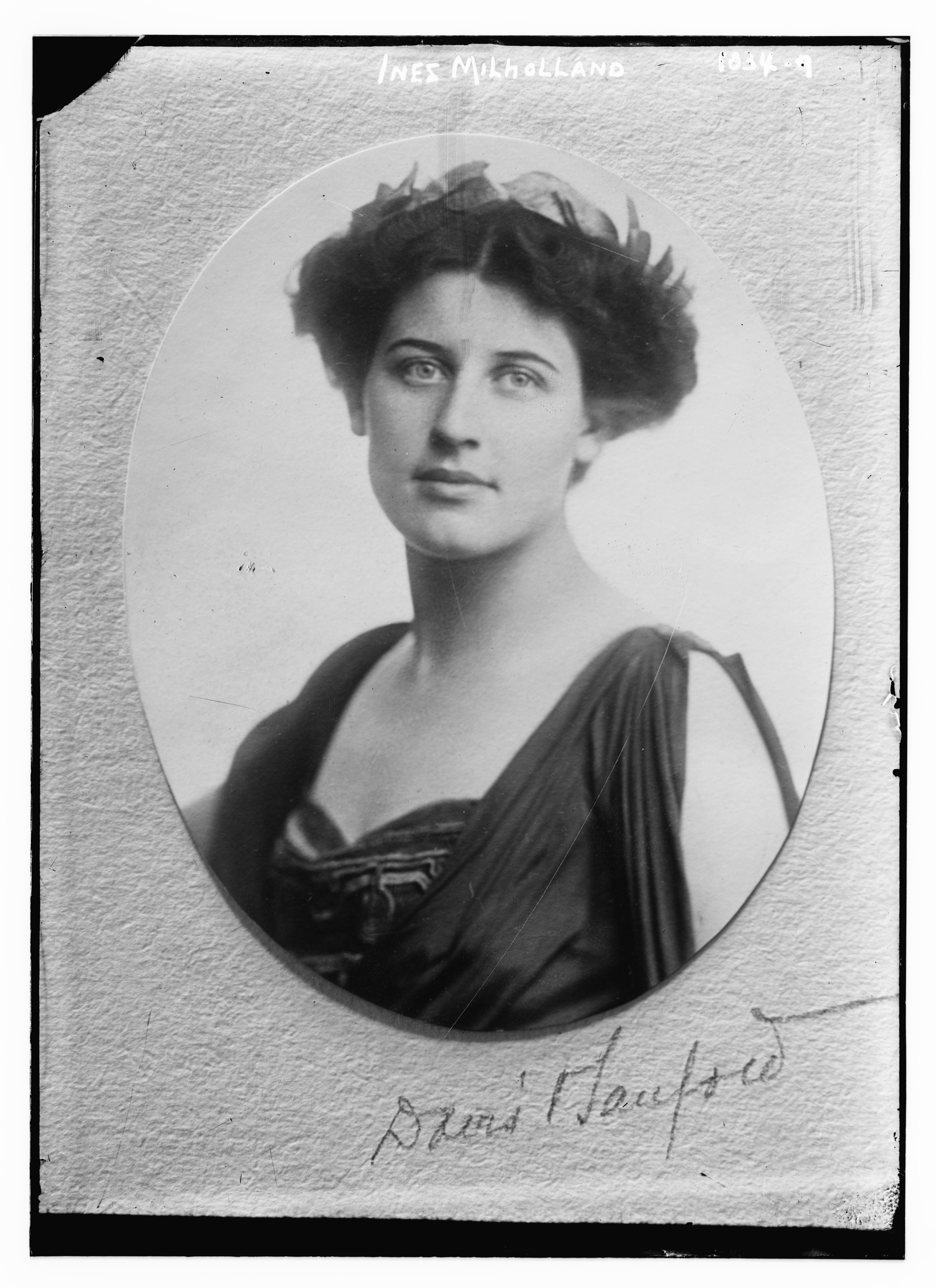
Inez Milholland

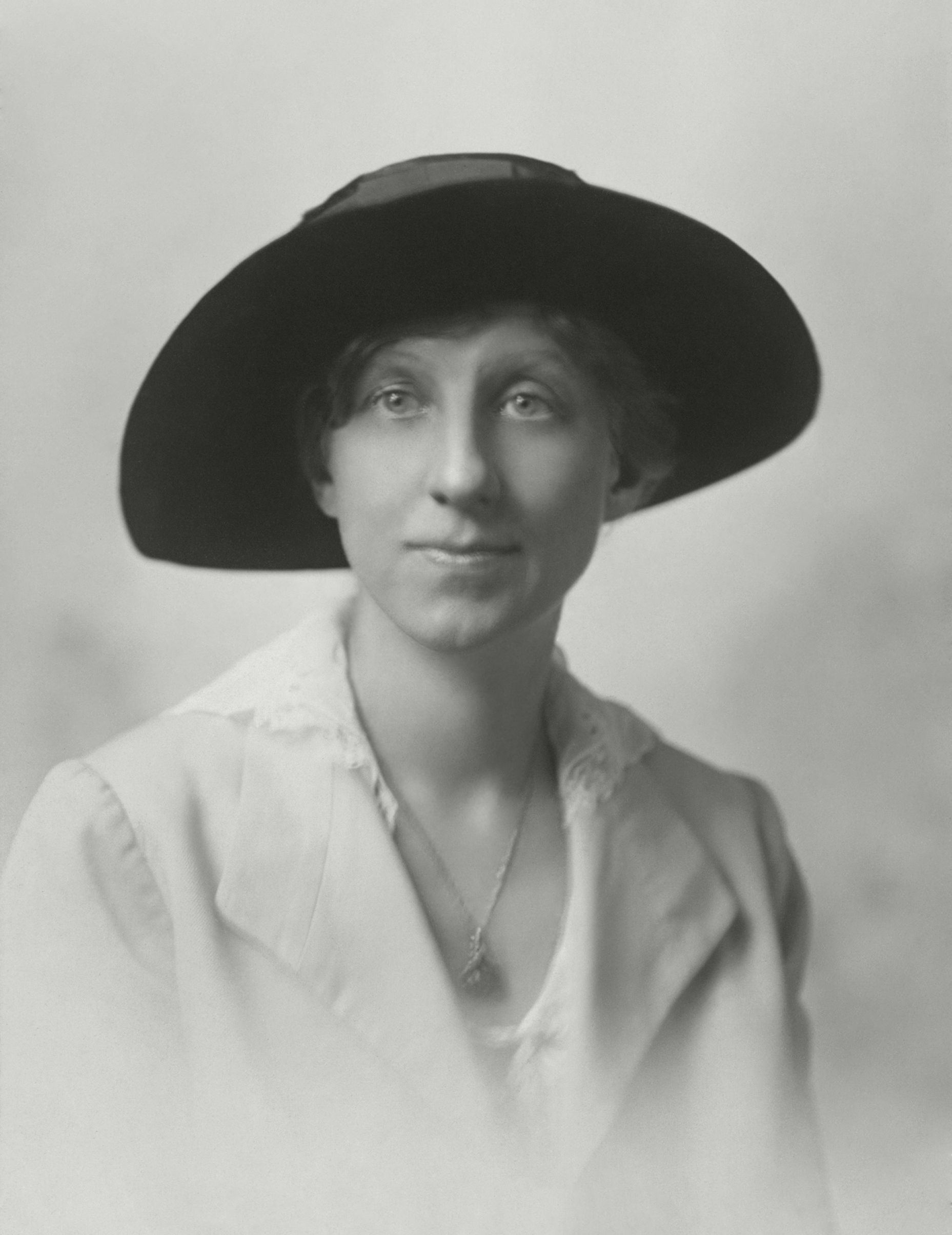
Mabel Vernon

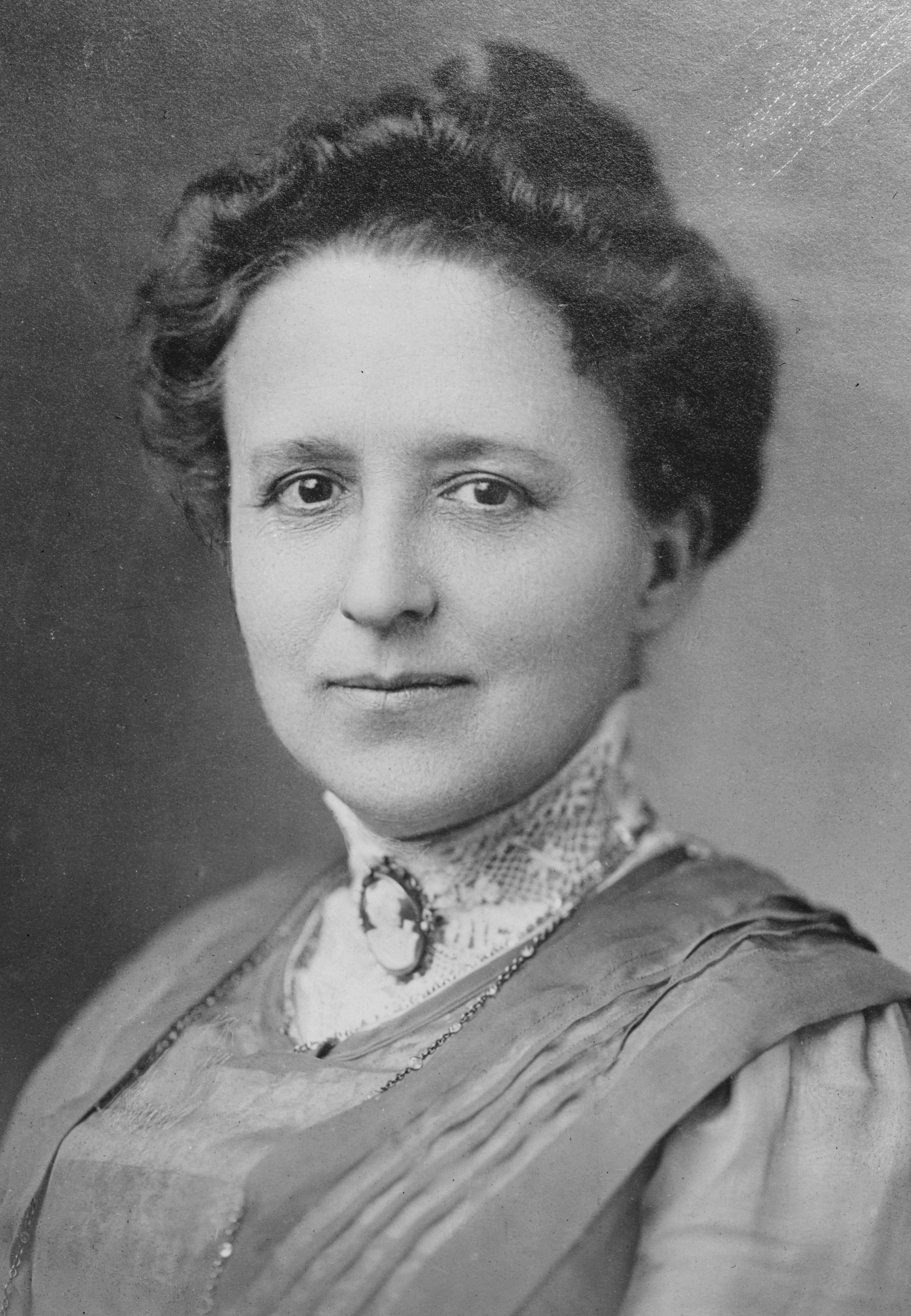
Judge Mary Bartelme, NWP vice chair, 1916-1917

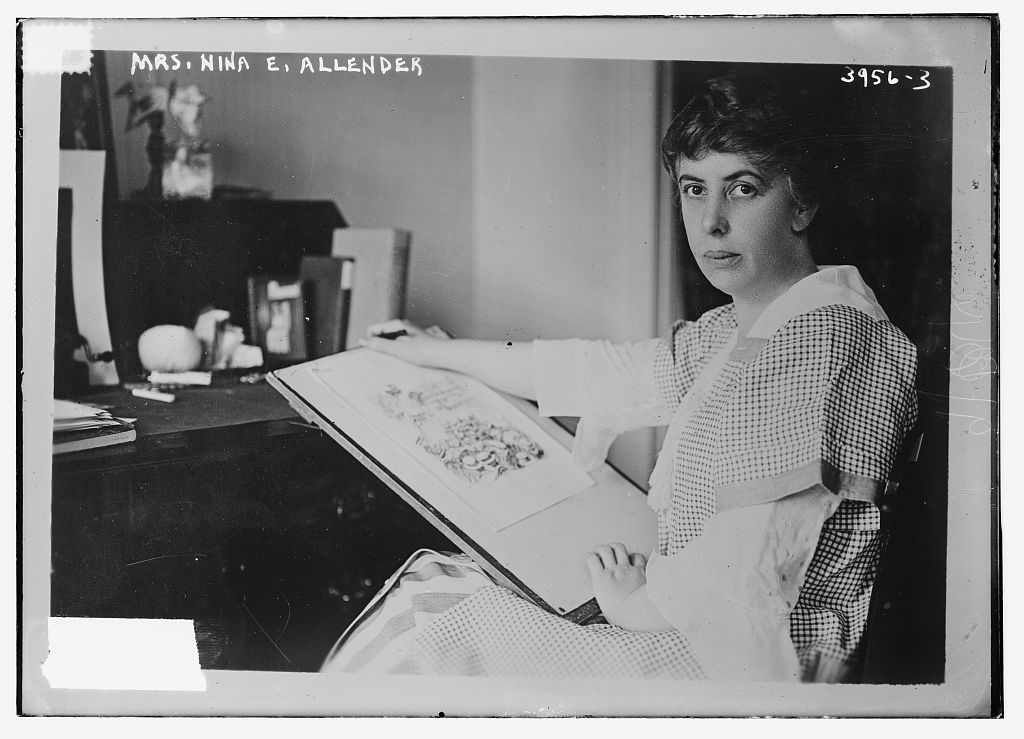
Nina Allender, political cartoonist for The Suffragist

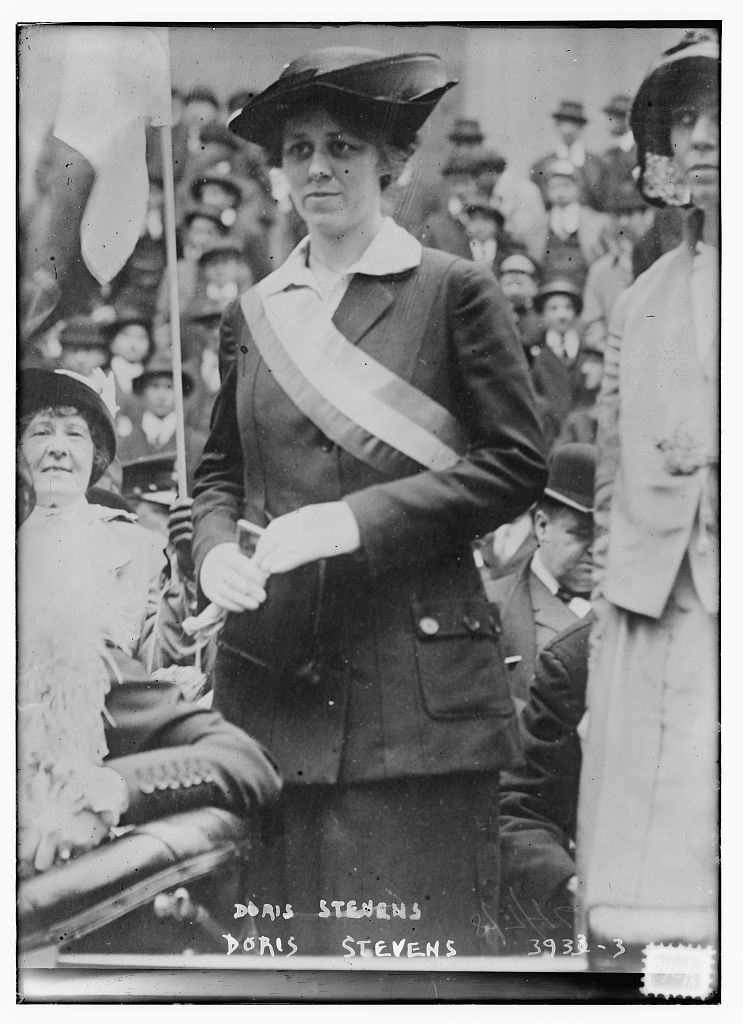
Doris Stevens, author of Jailed for Freedom

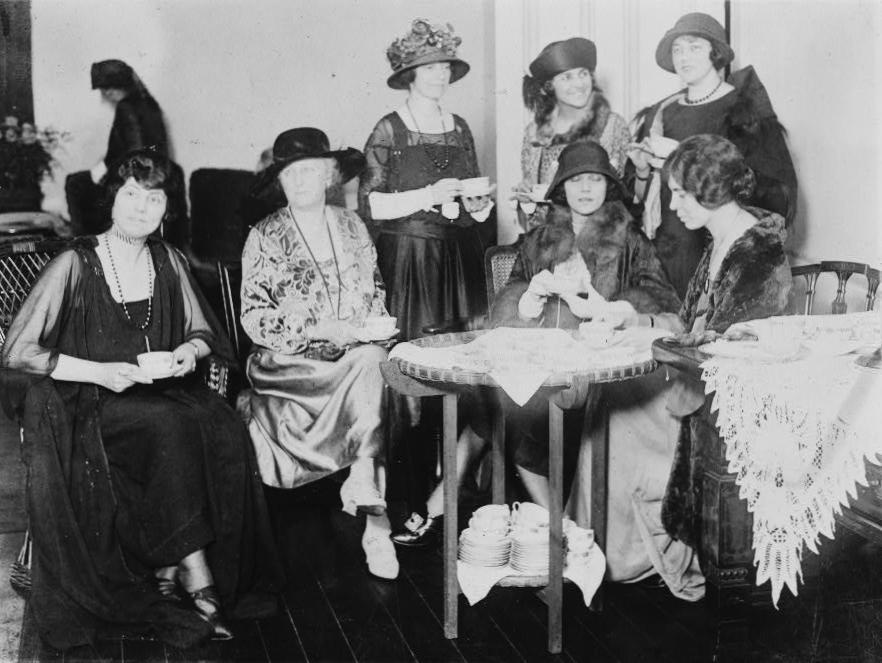
Reception tea at the NWP for Alice Brady

== Opposition to Woodrow Wilson ==
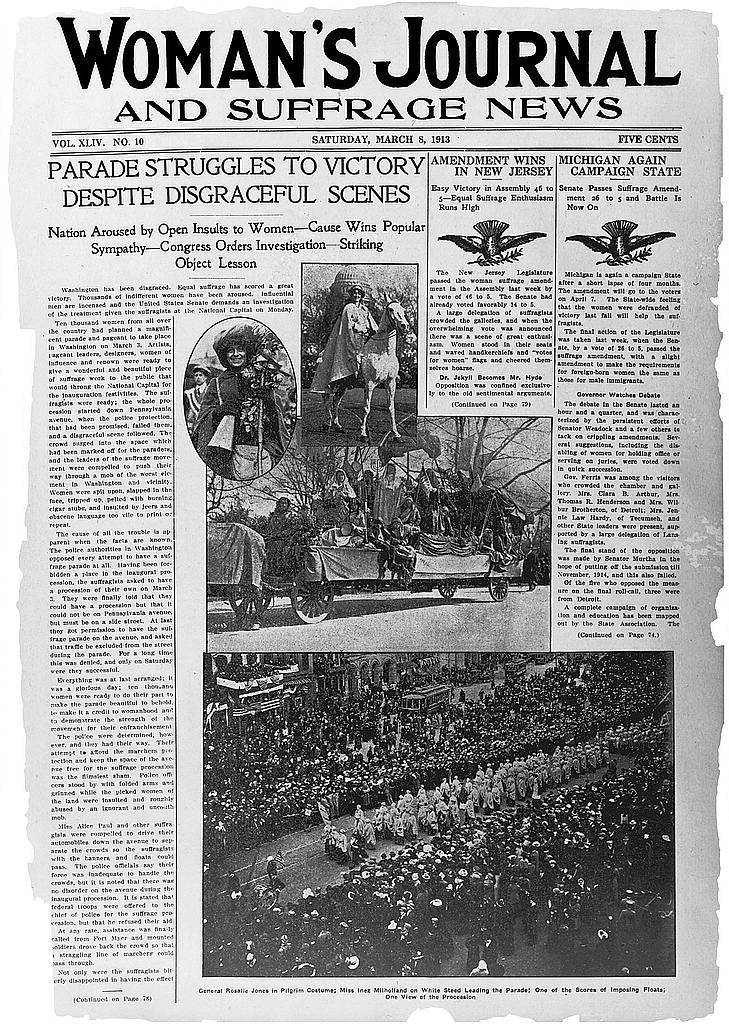
March 8, 1913 front page of Woman's Journal

Women associated with the party staged a very innovative suffrage parade on March 3, 1913, the day before President Woodrow Wilson's inauguration.

During the group's first meeting, Paul clarified that the party would not be a traditional political party and therefore would not endorse a candidate for president during elections. While non-partisan, the NWP directed most of its attention to President Woodrow Wilson and the Democrats, criticizing them as responsible for the failure to pass a constitutional amendment. As a result, in 1918, Paul ran a campaign that boycotted Democrats because of their refusal to support women's suffrage. They decided to boycott the entire party, including pro-suffrage Democrats. Eventually, the boycott of Democrats spearheaded by the NWP lead to a Republican majority in the house. The National Woman's Party continued to focus on suffrage as their main cause. It refused to either support or attack American involvement in the World War, while the rival NAWSA, under Carrie Chapman Catt gave full support to the war effort. As a result, a diverse group of activists such as pacifists and Socialists were attracted to the NWP due to its opposition to an anti-suffrage president.

== Picketing the White House ==
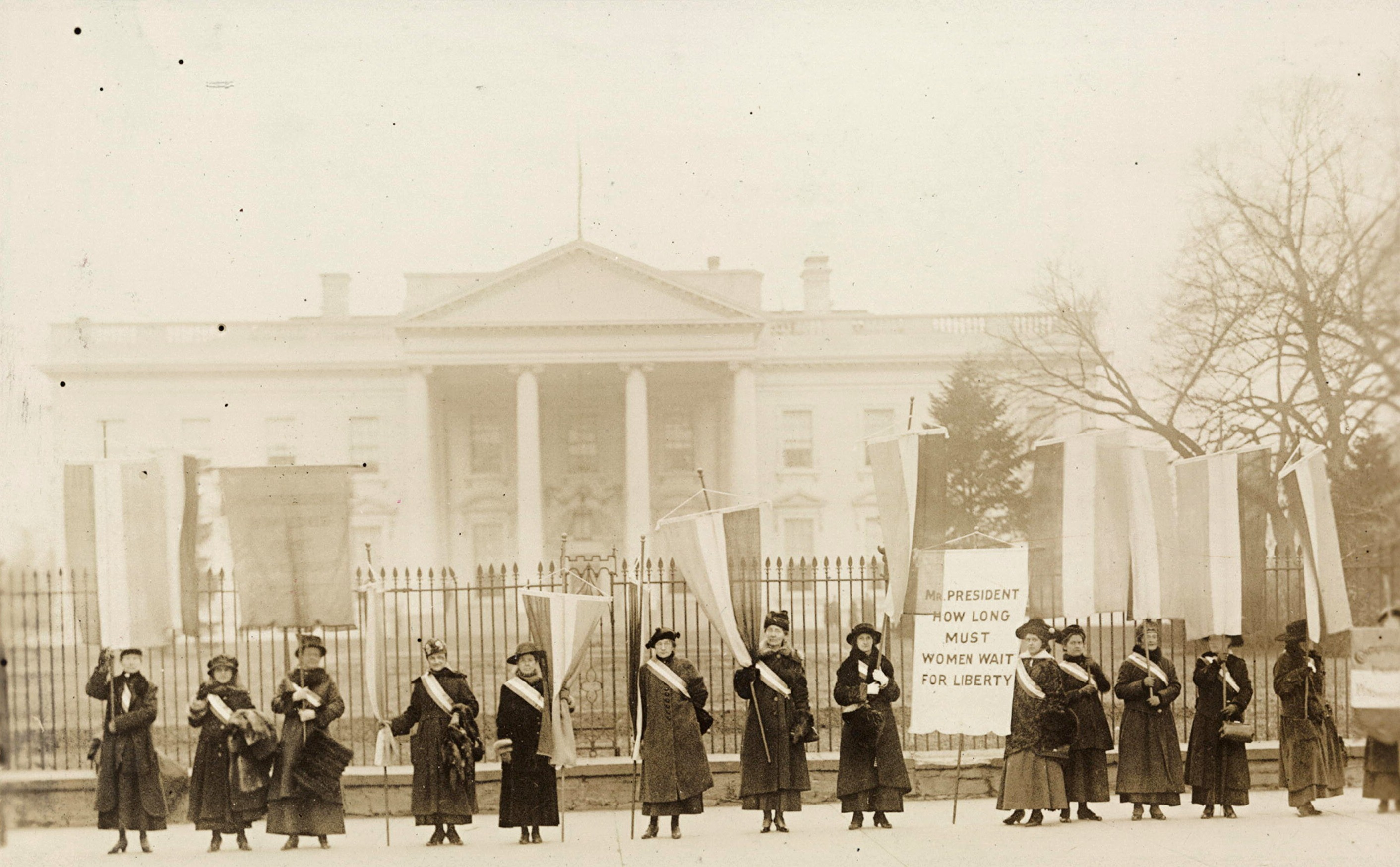
NWP members picket the White House during the Silent Sentinels protests in 1917; the banner reads, "Mr. President, How Long Must Women Wait For Liberty."

The escalating conflict in Europe didn't stop Alice Paul and the NWP from protesting Wilson's hypocritical stance on the war. Wilson promoted the idea of maintaining democracy abroad, even though the United States still denied half of its citizens the right to vote. The NWP pickets were seen as controversial because they continued during war time and other suffrage groups like NAWSA chose to support the war effort. Known as "Silent Sentinels", their action lasted from January 10, 1917, until June 1919. The picketers were tolerated at first, but when they continued to picket after the United States declared war in 1917, they were arrested by police for obstructing traffic. Regardless of the weather, the women stood outside of the White House holding banners, constantly reminding Wilson of his hypocrisy. When they were first arrested, Lucy Burns claimed that they were political prisoners but were treated as regular prisoners. As a tribute to their commitment to suffrage, they refused to pay the fines and accepted prison time.

The first night that the Silent Sentinels spent in jail was known as the Night of Terror: the prisoners were beaten until a few of them were unconscious, starved, and Burns had her hands chained above her head. Due to this unlawful detention, many of the NWP's members went on hunger strikes; some, including Lucy Burns and Paul, were force-fed by jail personnel as a consequence. Hunger strikes left the women weak and in terrible conditions, but they persisted. After a while, the guards were told to force-feed the women. They had long narrow tubes shoved down their throats, which caused many injuries that failed to heal. The suffragists were also forced to provide labor in the workhouses and were often beaten and abused. Taking advantage of the mistreatment and physical abuse, some of the suffragists shared their stories to the press and to The Suffragist, their suffrage newspaper. Doris Stevens, a notable member of the NWP, wrote about their horrible experiences in the Occoquan Workhouse in her memoir Jailed for Freedom. The resulting publicity was at a time when Wilson was trying to build a reputation for himself and the nation as an international leader in human rights. Many of banners featured quotes from Wilson about preserving democracy abroad, which called attention to Wilson's hypocrisy and his lack of support for a national suffrage amendment.

There are many different theories about why Wilson changed his stance of suffrage. Wilson favored woman suffrage at the state level, but held off support for a nationwide constitutional amendment because his party was sharply divided, with the South opposing an amendment on the grounds of state's rights. The only Southern state to grant women the vote was Arkansas. The NWP in 1917–1919 repeatedly targeted Wilson and his party for not enacting an amendment. Wilson, however, kept in close touch with more moderate suffragists of the NAWSA. Wilson continued to hold off until he was sure the Democratic Party in the North was in support; the 1917 referendum in New York State in favor of suffrage proved decisive for him. In January 1918, Wilson went in person to the House and made a strong and widely published appeal to the House to pass the bill. The NWP had many innovative non-violent tactics including staging sit-ins, organizing deputations of high class and working-class women, boycotting the Democrats in midterm elections, using the voting power of women in the west, appealing to Wilson everyday through picketing, and calling out Wilson for supporting world democracy but not supporting it at home. These tactics were a contributing factor in getting Wilson to change his position on the suffrage bill. It passed but the Senate stalled until 1919 then finally sent the amendment to the states for ratification. Scholar Belinda A. Stillion Southard has written that "...the campaign of the NWP was crucial toward securing the passage of the Nineteenth Amendment."

== Fighting for equal rights ==
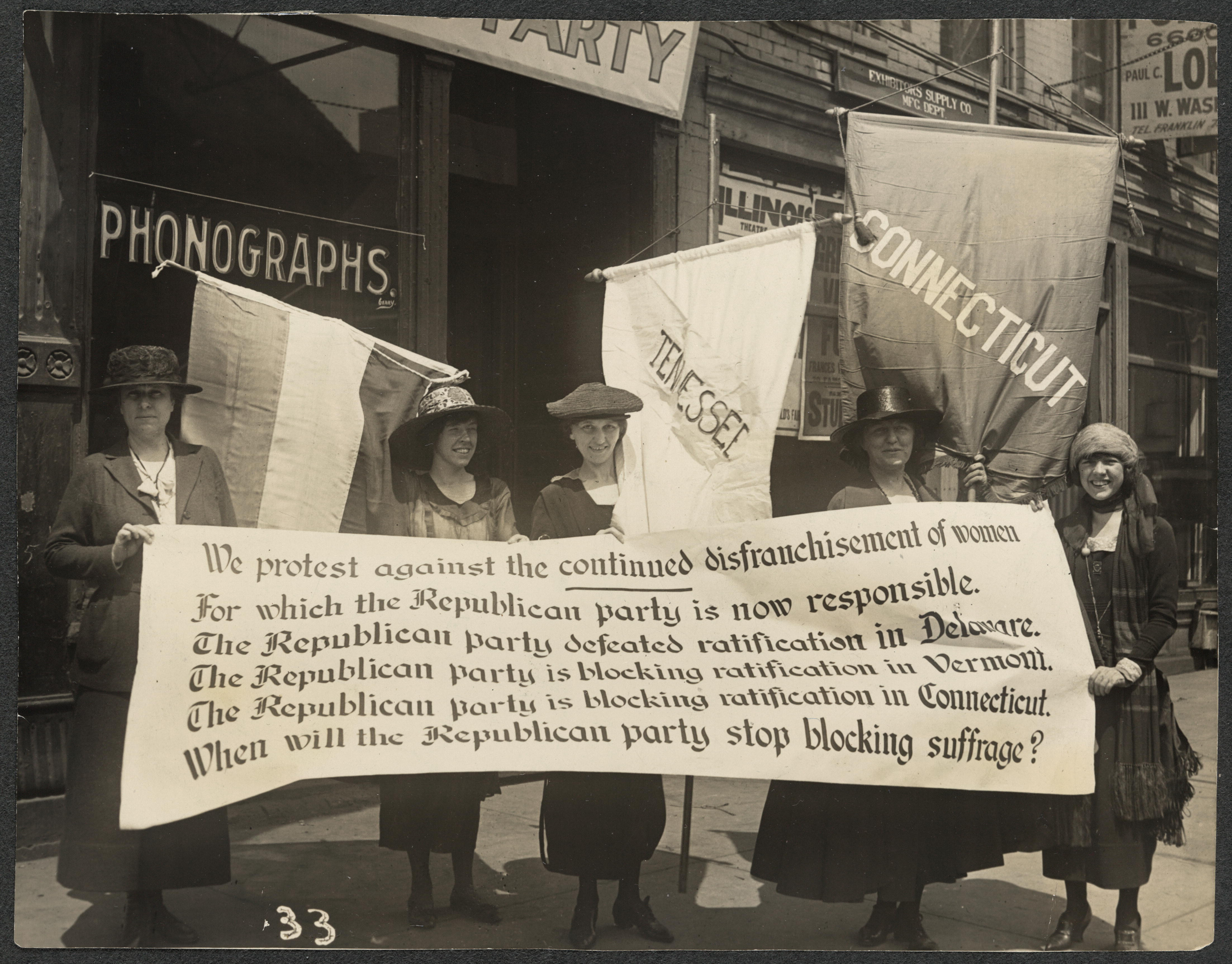
Party members picketing the Republican convention, Chicago, June 1920. L-R Abby Scott Baker, Florence Taylor Marsh, Sue Shelton White, Elsie Hill, Betty Gram.

The NWP played a critical role in the passage of the Nineteenth Amendment in 1920, which granted U.S. women the right to vote. Alice Paul then turned her attention to securing the Equal Rights Amendment (ERA) which she felt was vital for women to secure gender equality. The NWP regrouped in 1923 and published the magazine Equal Rights. The publication was directed towards women but also intended to educate men about the benefits of women's suffrage, women's rights and other issues concerning American women.

Men and women shall have equal rights throughout the United States and every place subject to its jurisdiction.

The NWP did not support protective legislation and argued that these laws would continue to depress women's wages and prevent women from gaining access to all types of work and parts of society. But, the NWP did support working women and their support was vital throughout their campaign for the national Amendment. Alice Paul organized many working class deputations and even sent over 400 blue collar workers to meet with Wilson. Although seen as highly controversial due to the status difference, this move showed Paul's support for all types of women, not just those of prestigious class.

After 1920, the National Woman's Party authored over 600 pieces of legislation fighting for women's equality; over 300 were passed. In addition, the NWP continued to lobby for the passage of the Equal Rights Amendment and under president Sarah Tarleton Colvin, who served in 1933, pressed for equal pay. Scholar Mary K. Trigg has noted, "...the NWP played a central role in the women's rights movement after 1945. It stuck to its laser-like focus on the ERA, doggedly lobbying year in and year out for the amendment's introduction in Congress." In 1997, the NWP ceased to be a lobbying organization. Instead, it turned its focus to education and to preserving its collection of first hand source documents from the women's suffrage movement. The NWP continues to function as an educational organization, maintaining and interpreting the collection left by the work of the historic National Woman's Party.

Congress passed the ERA Amendment and many states ratified it, but at the last minute in 1982 it was stopped by a coalition of conservatives led by Phyllis Schlafly and never passed.

== Title VII of the Civil Rights Act of 1964 ==
In 1963 Congress passed the Equal Pay Act of 1963, which prohibited wage differentials based on sex.

The prohibition on sex discrimination was added by Howard W. Smith, a powerful Virginian Democrat who chaired the House Rules Committee. He was a conservative who strongly opposed civil rights laws for blacks, but voted in support of such laws for white women. Smith's amendment was passed by a teller vote of 168 to 133.

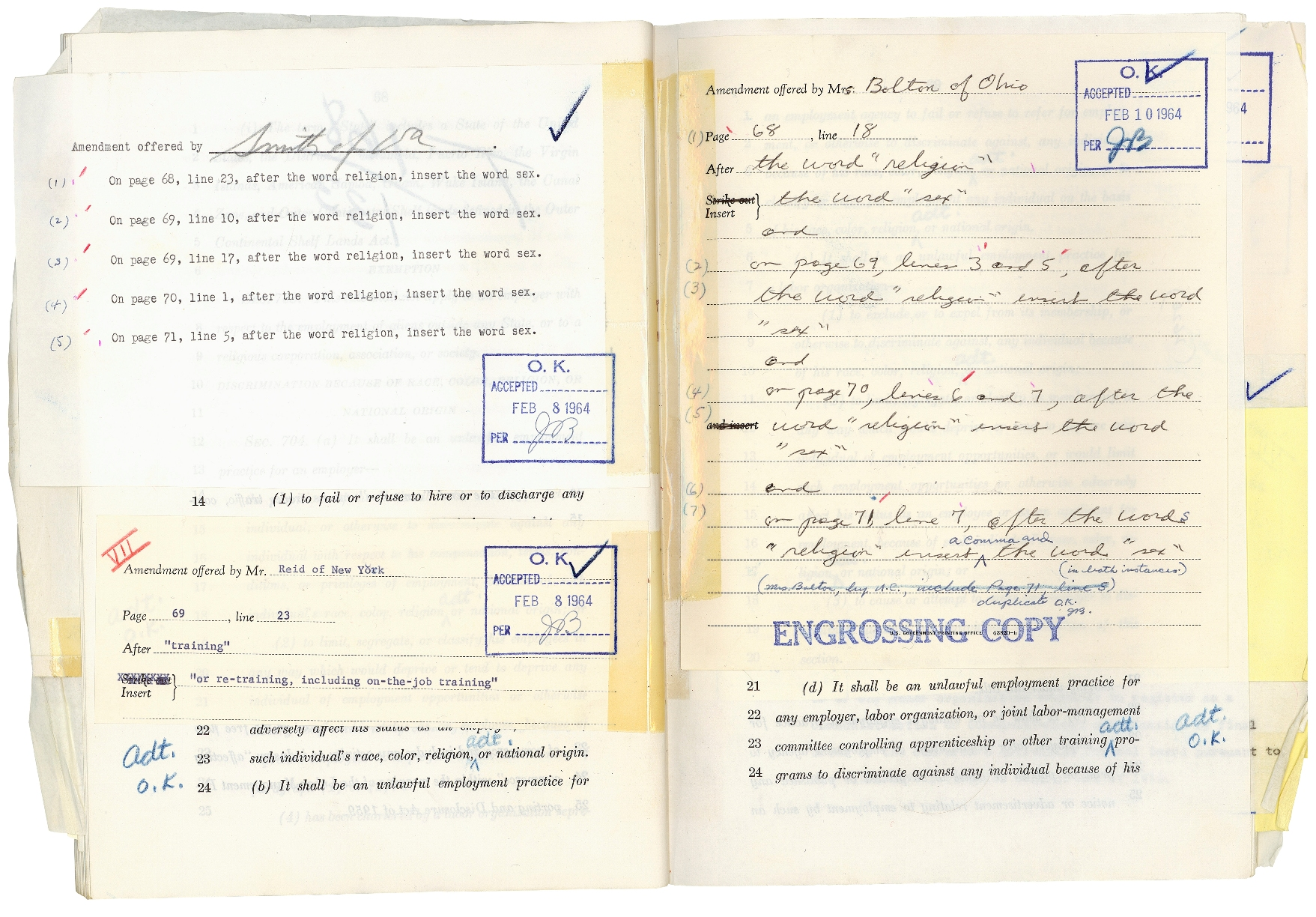
House Rules Committee clerk's record of markup session adding "sex" to bill.

Historians debate Smith's motivation—was it a cynical attempt to defeat the bill by someone opposed to both civil rights for blacks and women, or did he support women's rights and was attempting to improve the bill by broadening it to include women? Smith expected that Republicans, who had included equal rights for women in their party's platform since 1944, would probably vote for the amendment. Historians speculate that Smith was trying to embarrass northern Democrats who opposed civil rights for women because the clause was opposed by labor unions.

Smith asserted that he sincerely supported the amendment and, indeed, along with Rep. Martha Griffiths, he was the chief spokesperson for the amendment. For twenty years Smith had sponsored the Equal Rights Amendment—with no linkage to racial issues—in the House because he believed in it. For decades he had been close to the National Woman's Party and especially Paul. She and other activists had worked with Smith since 1945 trying to find a way to include sex as a protected civil rights category. Now was the moment. Griffiths argued that the new law would protect black women but not white women, and that was unfair to white women. Furthermore, she argued that the laws "protecting" women from unpleasant jobs were actually designed to enable men to monopolize those jobs, and that was unfair to women who were not allowed to try out for those jobs. The amendment passed with the votes of Republicans and Southern Democrats. The final law passed with the votes of Republicans and Northern Democrats. Pauli Murray was also instrumental in the inclusion of sex in Title VII of the Civil Rights Act. Title VII of the Civil Rights Act prohibits the discrimination based on sex, which has been attributed to the betterment of women as a group.

== Publications ==
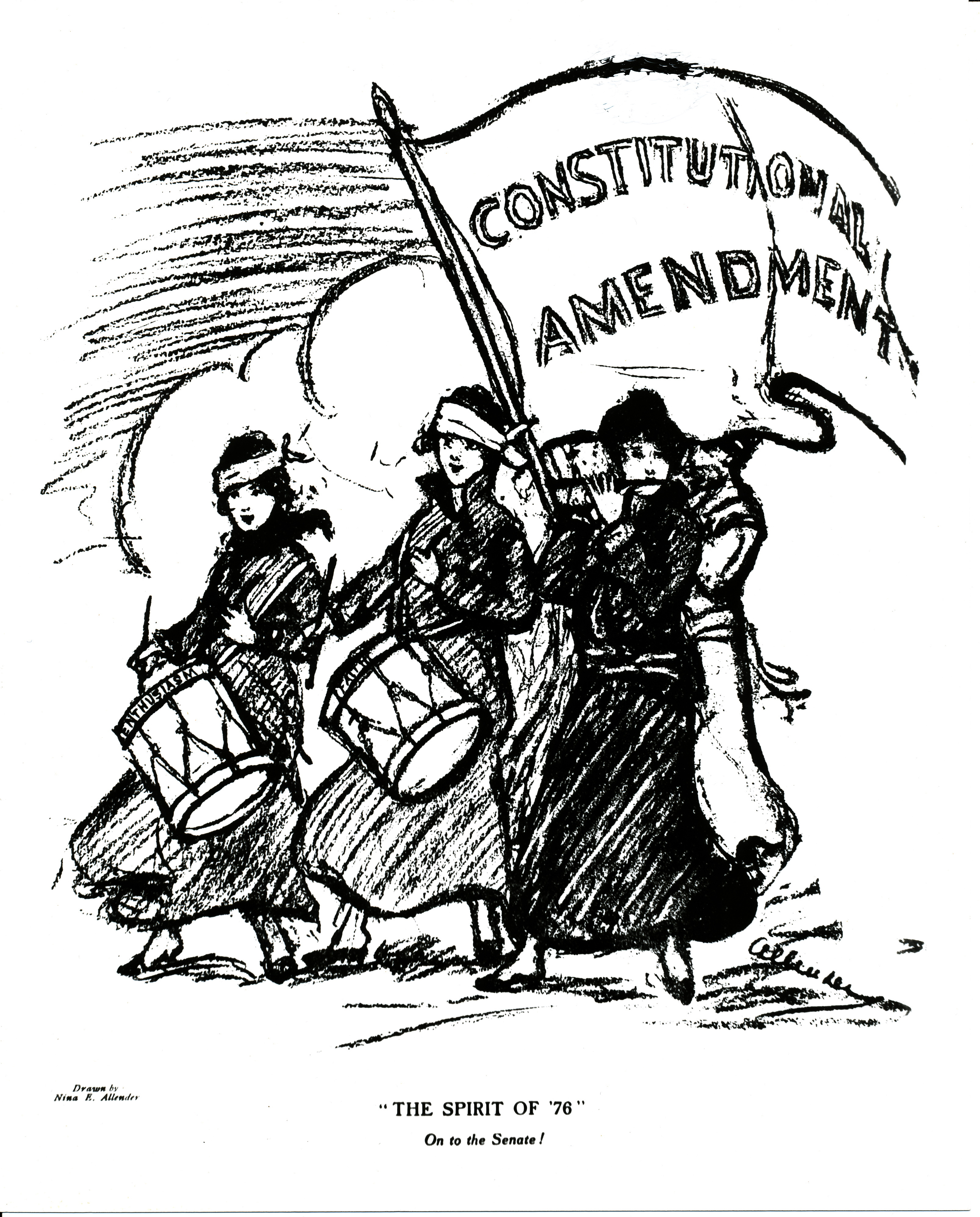
Nina E. Allender, The Spirit of '76.' On to the Senate!, 1915

The Suffragist newspaper was founded by the Congressional Union for Woman Suffrage in 1913. It was referred to as "the only women's political newspaper in the United States" and was published to promote women's suffrage activities. The Suffragist would follow weekly events and promote different views held by the leaders of the NWP. Its articles had political cartoons, by Nina E. Allender to garner support for the movement and communicate the status of the suffrage amendment.

The woman who reads our paper will be informed as to happenings in Congress, not only suffrage happenings, although they come first, but all proceedings of special interest to women. Men do not realize how serious are the changes that are taking place in the conduct of Congress. Women will have to inform them. Only in the pages of The Suffragist will you find the information you need.

— The Suffragist, 1914

After the amendment for the women's right to vote was passed, the publication was discontinued by the National Woman's Party and succeeded in 1923 by Equal Rights. Published until 1954, Equal Rights began as a weekly newsletter and evolved into a bi-monthly release aimed at keeping NWP members informed about developments related to the ERA and legislative issues. It included field reports, legislation updates and features about the activities of the NWP and featured writing from contributors including Crystal Eastman, Zona Gale, Ruth Hale and Inez Haynes Irwin. Josephine Casey appeared on the cover of the publication in April 1931 as a result of her recurring column about the labour conditions of female textile workers in Georgia.

== Legacy ==
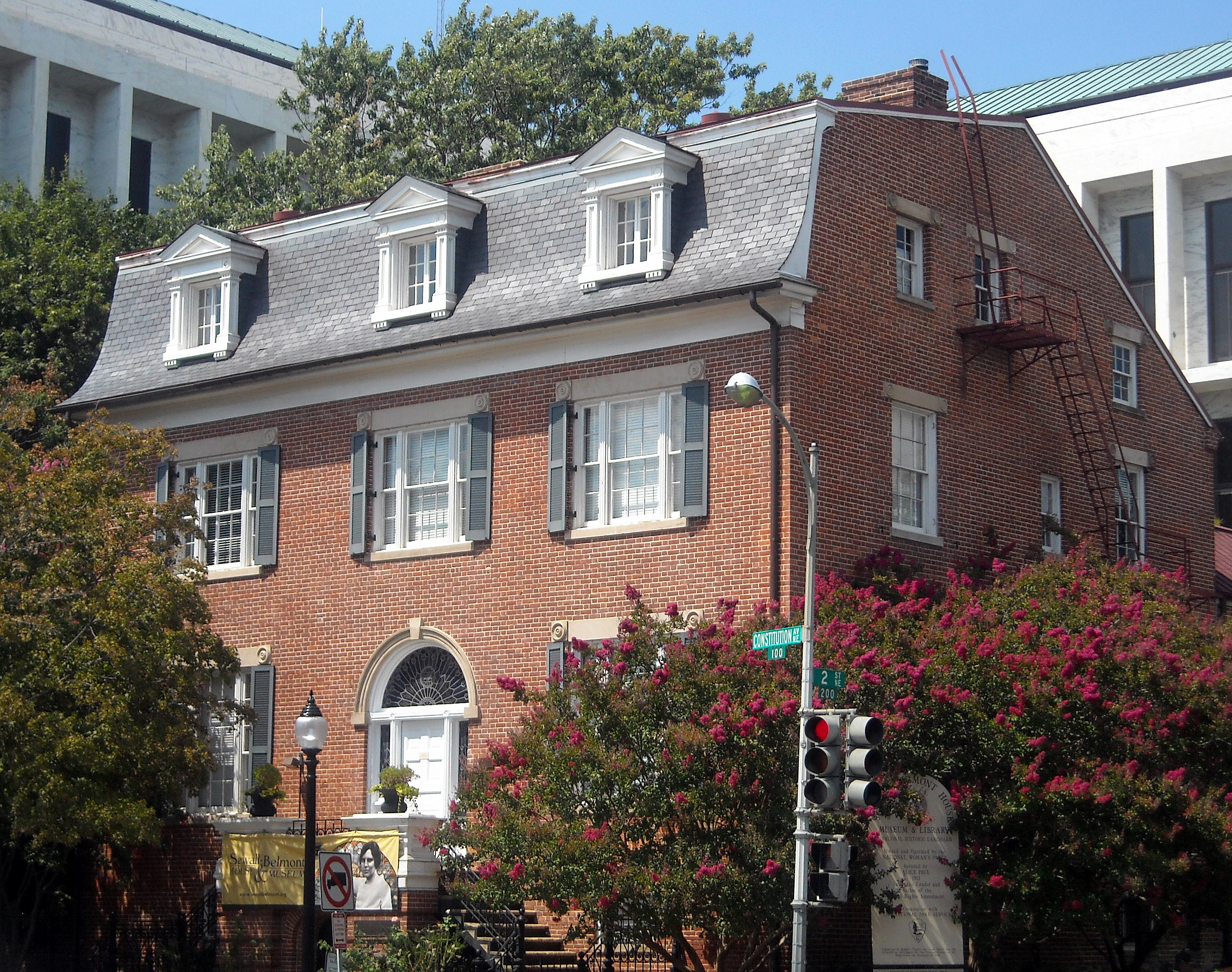
The Belmont–Paul Women's Equality National Monument, Washington, DC, Headquarters of the Historic National Woman's Party

The Nineteenth amendment, which prohibits the denial of the right to vote on the basis of sex, became the law of the land when it was ratified by a sufficient number of states in 1920. Many African American women and men in the Jim Crow South, however, remained disenfranchised after the ratification of this amendment until the Voting Rights Act of 1965.

For many years the National Woman's Party existed as a 501c3 educational organization. Its task was the maintenance and interpretation of the collection and archives of the historic National Woman's Party. The NWP operated out of the Belmont–Paul Women's Equality National Monument in Washington, DC, where objects from the collection are exhibited. The legacy that this group left behind is mixed. While Alice Paul and the NWP were instrumental in the passage of the Nineteenth Amendment was passed, the Party failed to include Black women and refused to help Black women gain the right to vote. To keep the support of southern members of the NWP, Paul refused to bring up the issue of race in the south. Her single-minded focus on the ERA caused her to refuse to fight the Jim Crow Laws barring black women the right to vote. Historian Nancy Cott has noted that as the party moved into the 1920s it remained ideologically consistent in the pursuit of a solitary goal for women and it remained an autocratically run, a single-minded and single-issue pressure group, still reliant on getting into the newspapers as a means of publicizing its cause, very insistent on the method of "getting in touch with the key men." NWP lobbyists went straight to legislators, governors, and presidents, not to their constituents.

In 1972 Congress passed the ERA Amendment and many states ratified it, but in 1982 it was stopped by a coalition of conservatives led by Phyllis Schlafly and never passed.

On January 1, 2021, NWP ceased operations as an independent non-profit organization and assigned its trademark rights and other uses of the party's name to the Alice Paul Institute, an educational non-profit. The Alice Paul Institute has invited three members of NWP Board of Directors to join their board and in the near future will create a new committee to "advise on a potential expansion of programs to the Washington, DC area and nationally". The papers and artifacts of the NWP were donated to the Library of Congress and the National Park Service to make them available to the public.

== Notable members ==
=== States and state leaders ===
When the National Woman's Party was incorporated in 1918 there were forty-four states and the District of Columbia represented.

==== National Committee of State Chairmen, 1920 ====
Florence Bayard Hilles as the National Committee Chairman and Miss Mary Ingham as secretary.

State	Name	City or town	Notes	Image
Alabama	Sara Haardt	Montgomery	Head of the Alabama branch of the National Woman's Party.	
Arizona	Nellie A. Hayward	Douglas	Head of the Arizona branch of the National Woman's Party. Was assistant secretary of the 6th Arizona State Legislature, a member of the Arizona House of Representatives elected in 1918 from Cochise County, Arizona, and along with former suffrage leaders Rosa McKay, Pauline O'Neill, and Anna Westover, voted for the Susan B. Anthony Amendment that passed both houses without a dissenting vote.	
California	Genevieve Allen	San Francisco	Head of the California branch of the National Woman's Party (NWP). A member of the National Woman's Party seeking then U.S. Senator Warren G. Harding's support.	Mrs. Genevieve Allen front row: Far right
Colorado	Bertha W. Fowler	Colorado Springs	Head of the Colorado branch of the National Woman's Party. Dr. Caroline Spencer was secretary.	Mrs. Bertha W. Fowler: Fourth from left
Connecticut	Katharine Martha Houghton Hepburn (Mrs. Thomas N. Hepburn)	Hartford	Head of the Connecticut branch of the National Woman's Party and chairperson of the National Executive Committee of the NWP.	Katharine Martha Houghton Hepburn (Mrs. Thomas N. Hepburn)
Delaware	Florence Bayard Hilles	Wilmington	Head of the Delaware branch of the National Woman's Party and a member of the national executive committee. Daughter of Thomas F. Bayard. Spent 3 days of a 60-day sentence for picketing the White House and was pardoned by President Wilson.	F B Hilles
District of Columbia	Delia Sheldon Jackson		Head of the Washington D.C. branch of the National Woman's Party. A member of the group that called on Senator Harding for support.	
Florida	Helen Hunt	Jacksonville	Head of the Florida branch of the National Woman's Party. Hunt was a journalist and lawyer, born February 10, 1892, to Aaron and Lillian Hunt.	
Georgia	Mrs. W.A. Maddox	Atlanta	Head of the Georgia branch of the National Woman's Party	
Idaho	Mrs. John E. White	Twin Falls	Head of the Idaho branch of the National Woman's Party	
Illinois	Mrs. Lola Maverick Lloyd		Head of the Illinois branch of the National Woman's Party	
Indiana	Mrs. W.C. Bobbs	Indianapolis	Head of the Indiana branch of the National Woman's Party. Eleanor P. Barker served as state chair of the Indiana chapter of the Congressional Union for Women's Suffrage and was on the advisory council for the National Woman's Party.	
Iowa	Mrs. Florence Harsh	Des Moines	Head of the Iowa branch of the National Woman's Party	
Kansas	Mrs. Lilla Day Monroe	Topeka	Head of the Kansas branch of the National Woman's Party. President of the Kansas Equal Suffrage Association, editor of "The Club Member" and "The Kansas Woman?s Journal", and was a founding member of the Good Government Club.	
Kentucky	Edith Callahan	Louisville	Head of the Kentucky branch of the National Woman's Party.	
Louisiana	Mrs. E. G. Graham (Eleanor G. Graham)	New Orleans	Head of the Louisiana branch of the National Woman's Party.	
Maine	Florence Brooks Whitehouse (Mrs. Robert Treat Whitehouse)	Portland, Maine	Helped launch and served as first head of the Maine branch of the National Woman's Party.	
Maryland	Mrs. Donald R. Hooker	Baltimore	Head of the Maryland branch of the National Woman's Party. Editor of the Maryland Suffrage News then The Suffragist.	
Massachusetts	Agnes H. Morey	Brookline	Head of the Massachusetts branch of the National Woman's Party. Her daughter, Katharine A. Morey (One of the Silent Sentinels), was also a leader in the suffrage movement.	
Michigan	Marjorie Miller Whittemore (Mrs. W. Nelson Whittemore)	Detroit	Head of the Michigan branch of the National Woman's Party. Not to be confused with her sister-in-law Miss Margaret Faye Whittemore, also a member of the NWP.	
Minnesota	Sarah Tarleton Colvin (Mrs. A. R. Colvin)	St. Paul	Head of the Minnesota branch of the National Woman's Party.	
Mississippi	Ann Calvert Neely	Vicksburg, Mississippi	Head of the Mississippi branch of the National Woman's Party.	
Missouri	Mrs. H.B. Leavens	Kansas	Head of the Missouri branch of the National Woman's Party. Formed the Kansas City Woman Suffrage Association in 1911 along with others such as Dr. Dora Green, Helen Osborne (Secretary), Mrs. G.B. Longan, Mrs. Henry N. Ess (President), and Clara Cramer Leavens (Treasurer).	
Nebraska	Gertrude Hardenburg Laws Hardy (Mrs. W. E. Hardy)	Lincoln	Head of the Nebraska branch of the National Woman's Party.	
New Hampshire	Mrs. Winfield Shaw	Manchester	Head of the New Hampshire branch of the National Woman's Party.	
New Jersey	Alison Turnbull Hopkins (Mrs. J. A. H. Hopkins)	Newark	Head of the New Jersey branch of the National Woman's Party. Married to J. A. H. Hopkins, a member of The Committee of 48.	
New Mexico	Cora Armstrong Kellam (Mrs. Arthur A. Kellam)	Albuquerque	Head of the New Mexico branch of the National Woman's Party. Along with Florence Bayard Hilles (Delaware NWP chairperson) were members of the "Women's Committee of the Council of National Defense" met with President and Mrs. Wilson on Federal Suffrage Amendment.	
New York	Alva Belmont (Mrs. O. H. P. Belmont)	Long Island	Head of the New York branch of the National Woman's Party. Mrs. John Winters Brannan (acting)	
North Carolina	Ella St. Clair Thompson	Spruce Pine	Head of the North Carolina branch of the National Woman's Party.	
North Dakota	Beulah McHenry Amidon (Mrs. Chas. Amidon)	Fargo	Head of the North Dakota branch of the National Woman's Party. She should not be confused with her daughter, also named Beulah Amidon (later Beulah Amidon Ratliff) and known as the "Prettiest Picket"	
Ohio	Helen Clegg Winters (Mrs. Valentine Winters)	Dayton	Head of the Ohio branch of the National Woman's Party.	
Oklahoma	Miss Ida F. Halsey	Oklahoma City	Head of the Oklahoma branch of the National Woman's Party. Was replaced by Florence Etheridge Cobb in 1922.	
Oregon	Mrs. W. J. Hawkins	Portland	Head of the Oregon branch of the National Woman's Party.	
Pennsylvania	Miss Mary H. Ingham	Philadelphia	Head of the Pennsylvania branch of the National Woman's Party.	
Rhode Island	Mary Lavinia Archbold Van Beuren (Mrs. Michael Van Beuran)	Newport	Head of the Rhode Island branch of the National Woman's Party.	
South Carolina	Mrs. W. P. Vaughan	Greenville	Head of the South Carolina branch of the National Woman's Party.	
South Dakota	Harriet E. Fellows; Mrs. A. R. Fellows	Sioux Falls	Head of the South Dakota branch of the National Woman's Party.	
Tennessee	Sue White	Jackson	Head of the Tennessee branch of the National Woman's Party.	
Texas	Anna Tidball Millett (Mrs. Paul Millett)	Fort Worth	Head of the Texas branch of the National Woman's Party.	
Utah	Mrs. Louise Garnett	Salt Lake City	Head of the Utah branch of the National Woman's Party.	
Virginia	Mrs. Sophie G. Meredith	Richmond	Head of the Virginia branch of the National Woman's Party.	
Washington	Mrs. Sophie L. W. Clark	Seattle	Head of the Washington branch of the National Woman's Party.	
West Virginia	Miss Florence Hoge	Wheeling	Head of the West Virginia branch of the National Woman's Party.	
Wisconsin	Mabel Raef Putnam; Mrs. Frank Putnam	Milwaukee	Head of the Wisconsin branch of the National Woman's Party.	
Wyoming	Mrs. P. E. Glafcke	Cheyenne	Head of the Wyoming branch of the National Woman's Party.	

=== Other notable members ===
- Edith Ainge (1873-1948), treasurer of the NWP
- Nina E. Allender
- Caroline Lexow Babcock
- Abby Scott Baker
- Mary Ritter Beard
- Alva Belmont
- Harriot Stanton Blatch
- Lucy Burns
- Marion Cothren
- Dorothy Day
- Amelia Earhart
- Crystal Eastman
- Julia Emory
- Sara Bard Field
- Phoebe Hearst
- Alison Turnbull Hopkins
- Inez Haynes Irwin
- Edna Buckman Kearns (1881-1934), suffrage activist
- Anne Martin
- Perle Mesta
- Nell Mercer
- Inez Milholland
- Vida Milholland
- Alice Paul
- Florence Kenyon Hayden Rector
- Rebecca Hourwich Reyher
- Jane Norman Smith, chairman from 1927 to 1929
- Caroline Spencer
- Doris Stevens
- Phyllis Terrell
- Mabel Vernon
- Agnes E. Wells
- Evelyn Wotherspoon Wainwright
- Rose Winslow
- Margaret Fay Whittemore
- Emma Wold
- Clara Snell Wolfe
- Maud Younger (1870-1936), suffragist, feminist, labour activist

== See also ==
- History of feminism
- List of suffragists and suffragettes
- List of women's rights activists
- Prison Special
- Silent Sentinels
- Suffrage Hikes
- Timeline of women's legal rights (other than voting)
- Timeline of women's suffrage
- Woman Suffrage Procession (1913)
- Women's suffrage organizations
