= Crime in Washington, D.C. =

Washington, D.C.
- Crime rates* (2024)

Violent crimes
- Homicide: 27
- Robbery: 301
- Aggravated assault: 439.87
- Total violent crime: 494

Property crimes
- Burglary: 143
- Motor vehicle theft: 732
- Arson: 1
- Total property crime: 3,685
- Note: Reported crimes per 100,000 population Source: Metropolitan Police Department Official Crime Stats 2024

Crime in Washington, D.C., is directly related to the city's demographics, geography, and unique criminal justice system. The District's population reached a peak of 802,178 in 1950. Shortly after that, the city began losing residents, and by 1980 Washington had lost one-quarter of its population. The population loss to the suburbs also created a new demographic pattern, which divided affluent neighborhoods west of Rock Creek Park from the less well-off neighborhoods to the east.

Despite being the headquarters of multiple federal law enforcement agencies, such as the Federal Bureau of Investigation (FBI) and United States Drug Enforcement Administration (DEA), the nationwide crack epidemic of the 1980s and 1990s greatly affected the city and led to large increases in crime. The number of homicides in Washington peaked in 1991 at 482, a rate of 80.6 homicides per 100,000 residents, and the city eventually became known as the "murder capital" of the United States.

The crime rate started to fall in the mid-1990s as the crack cocaine epidemic gave way to economic revitalization projects. Neighborhood improvement efforts and new business investment have also started to transform neighborhoods east of the Anacostia River, leading to the first rise in the District's population in 60 years.

By the mid-2000s, crime rates in Washington dropped to their lowest levels in over 20 years, to less than a fifth of record highs. From 2024-2025, the rate of violent crime in DC reached a 30-year low, according to data from the United States Attorney's office. In August 2025, President Donald Trump claimed without evidence that Washington, D.C. was "overtaken by violent gangs and bloodthirsty criminals". D.C. Mayor Muriel Bowser countered Trump's claim, stating that violent crime in the DC area is at its lowest level in three decades.

== Statistics ==
Crime trends, 1995–2018
Year	Violent crime	Change	Property crime	Change
1995	2,661.4	-	9,512.1	-
1996	2,469.8	−7.1%	9,426.9	−0.9%
1997	2,024.0	−18%	7,814.9	−17%
1998	1,718.5	−15%	7,117.0	−8.9%
1999	1,627.7	−5.3%	6,439.3	−9.5%
2000	1,507.9	−7.4%	5,768.6	−10.4%
2001	1,602.4	6.3%	6,139.9	6.4%
2002	1,632.9	1.9%	6,389.4	4.1%
2003	1,624.9	−0.5%	5,863.5	−8.2%
2004	1,371.2	−15.6%	4,859.1	−17.1%
2005	1,380.0	0.6%	4,489.8	−7.6%
2006	1,508.4	9.3%	4,653.8	3.7%
2007	1,414.3	−6.2%	4,913.9	5.6%
2008	1,437.7	1.7%	5,104.6	3.9%
2009	1,345.9	−6.8%	4,745.4	−7.6%
2010	1,241.1	−7.8%	4,510.1	−5%
2011	1,130.3	−8.9%	4,581.3	1.6%
2012	1,177.9	4.2%	4,628.0	1.0%
2013	1,219.0	3.5%	4,790.7	3.5%
2014	1,244.4	1.9%	5,182.5	8.2%
2015	1,269.1	2.1%	4,676.2	-9.6%
2016	1,205.9	-5.3%	4,802.9	2.4%
2017	1,004.9	-16.5%	4,283.9	-9.5%
2018	995.9	-0.7%	4,373.8	2.3%
1995	2,661.4	-	9,512.1	-
2018	995.9	−62.5%	4,373.8	−54.0%

According to Uniform Crime Report statistics compiled by the FBI, there were 995.9 violent crimes per 100,000 people reported in the District of Columbia in 2018. The District also reported 4,373.8 property crimes per 100,000 during the same period.

The average violent crime rate in the District of Columbia from 1960 through 1999 was 1,722 violent crimes per 100,000 population, and violent crime, since peaking in the mid-1990s, decreased by 62.5% in the 1995–2018 period (property crime decreased 54.0% during the same period). However, violent crime is still more than twice the national average rate of 368.9 reported offenses per 100,000 people in 2018.

In the early 1990s, Washington, D.C., was known as the nation's "murder capital", experiencing 482 homicides in 1991. The elevated crime levels were associated with the introduction of crack cocaine during the late 1980s and early 1990s. The crack was brought into Washington, D.C. by Colombian cartels and sold in drug markets such as "The Strip" (the largest in the city) located a few blocks north of the United States Capitol. A quarter of juveniles with criminal charges in 1988 tested positive for drugs.

After the 1991 peak there was a downward trend through to the late 1990s. In 2000, 242 homicides occurred, and the downward trend continued in the 2000s. In 2012, Washington, D.C. had only 92 homicides in 91 separate incidents, the lowest annual tally since 1963. The Metropolitan Police Department's official tally is 88 homicides, but that number does not include four deaths that were ruled self-defense or justifiable homicide by citizen. The cause of death listed on the four case records is homicide and MPD includes those cases in tallying homicide case closures at the end of the year.

As Washington neighborhoods undergo gentrification, crime has been displaced further east. Crime in neighboring Prince George's County, Maryland, initially experienced an increase, but has recently witnessed steep declines as poorer residents moved out of the city into the nearby suburbs. Crime has declined both in the District and the suburbs in recent years. There was an average of 11 robberies each day across the District of Columbia in 2006 which is far below the levels experienced in the 1990s.

In 2008, 42 crimes in the District were characterized as hate crimes; over 70% of the reports classified as hate crimes were a result of a bias against the victim's perceived sexual orientation. Those findings continue the trend from previous years, although the total number of hate crimes is down from 57 in 2006, and 48 in 2005. By 2012, the number of hate crimes reported was 81, and dropped to 70 in 2013.

In 2023, D.C. recorded 274 homicides which was a 20-year high. D.C. had the fifth-highest murder rate among the nation's largest cities. Many D.C. residents began to pressure the United States Attorney for the District of Columbia for not prosecuting nearly 70% of arrested offenders in 2022. After months of criticism, the rate of unprosecuted cases dropped to 56% by October 2023. Despite the improvement, it was still higher than nine of the past 10 years and almost twice what it was in 2013. In February 2024, the D.C. Council passed a major crime bill in hopes of slowing down rampant crime in the city. The bill introduces harsher penalties for arrested offenders.

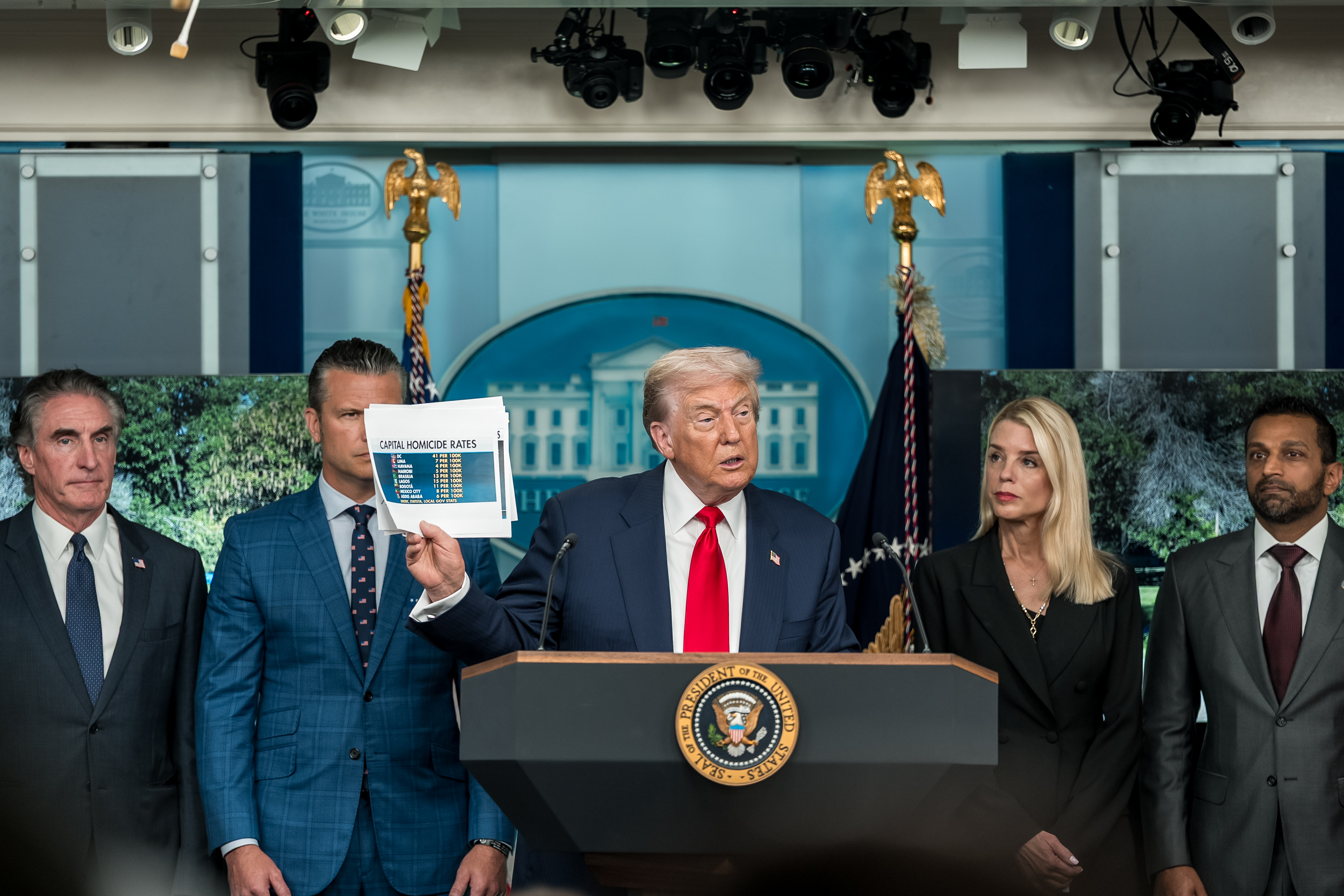
President Donald Trump and FBI Director Kash Patel (far right) in a press conference on crime in Washington, D.C. in August 2025

In August 2025, President Donald Trump announced a federal takeover of the Metropolitan Police Department in Washington, D.C., invoking Section 740 of the District of Columbia Home Rule Act and deploying 800 National Guard troops to the nation's capital, following his claim that the capital was "overtaken by violent gangs and bloodthirsty criminals". Trump cited D.C.'s relatively high homicide rate compared to other major cities and vowed to restore the capital's image. While the White House emphasized crime statistics to justify the intervention, data from the Justice Department just weeks before Trump's inauguration showed violent crime in D.C. at a 30-year low, with homicides, robberies, and carjackings sharply reduced from 2023 levels. Mayor Muriel Bowser condemned the deployment as unsettling and unprecedented, noting D.C.'s limited home rule status left it vulnerable to federal intrusion, and argued that Trump's grim depiction of the city was outdated.

=== Homicides by year ===
Year	Homicides
1985	147
1986	194
1987	225
1988	369
1989	434
1990	472
1991	482
1992	443
1993	454
1994	399
1995	360
1996	397
1997	301
1998	260
1999	241
2000	239
2001	241
2002	264
2003	249
2004	198
2005	196

Year	Homicides
2006	169
2007	181
2008	186
2009	144
2010	132
2011	108
2012	88
2013	104
2014	105
2015	162
2016	135
2017	116
2018	160
2019	166
2020	198
2021	226
2022	203
2023	274
2024	187
2025	128

== Criminal justice ==
=== Law enforcement ===
Law enforcement in Washington, D.C. is complicated by a network of overlapping federal and city agencies. The primary agency responsible for law enforcement in the District of Columbia is the Metropolitan Police Department (MPD). The MPD is a city agency headed by the Chief of Police, currently Pamela Smith, who is appointed by the mayor. The Metropolitan Police has 3,800 sworn officers and operates much like other municipal police departments elsewhere in the country. However, given the unique status of Washington as the United States capital, the MPD is adept at providing crowd control and security at large events. Despite its name, the MPD only serves within the boundaries of the District of Columbia and does not have jurisdiction within the surrounding Washington Metropolitan Area. The name dates to when MPD had jurisdiction over the "City of Georgetown", "Uniontown" (what is now known as the Anacostia neighborhood), and "Washington City" (what is now considered downtown).

Several other local police agencies have jurisdiction within the District of Columbia, including: the District of Columbia Protective Services Police Department, which is responsible for all properties owned or leased by the city government; and the Metro Transit Police Department, which has jurisdiction within Washington Metropolitan Area Transit Authority stations, trains, and buses. Alongside local law enforcement agencies, nearly every federal law enforcement agency has jurisdiction within Washington, D.C. The most visible federal police agencies are the United States Park Police, which is responsible for all parkland in the city, the United States Secret Service, and the United States Capitol Police.

Several special initiatives undertaken by the Metropolitan Police Department to combat violent crime have gained particular public attention. Most notable is the city's use of "crime emergencies", which when declared by the Chief of Police, allow the city to temporarily suspend officer schedules and assign additional overtime to increase police presence.

Despite the fact that crime emergencies do appear to reduce crime when enacted, critics fault the city for relying on such temporary stop-gap measures. In 2003, the city launched its Gang Intervention Project to combat the then-recent upward trend in Latino gang violence, primarily in the Columbia Heights and Shaw neighborhoods. The initiative was claimed a success when gang-related violence declined almost 90% from the start of the program to November 2006.

The most controversial program designed to deter crime was a system of police checkpoints in violence-prone neighborhoods. The checkpoints, in place from April 2008 through June 2008, were used in the Trinidad neighborhood of Northeast Washington. The program operated by stopping cars entering a police-designated area; officers then turned away those individuals who did not live or have business in the neighborhood. Despite protests by residents, the MPD claimed the checkpoints to be a successful tool in preventing violent crime. However, in July 2010, a federal appeals court found that the checkpoints violated residents' constitutional rights. The police had no plans to continue to use the practice—with declining crime rates—but D.C. Attorney General Peter Nickles said that officers would work to find a "more creative way to deal with very unusual circumstances that is consistent with the Fourth Amendment."

In 2012, the first female Chief of Police of DC, Cathy Lanier, was hired by Mayor Vincent C. Gray.

On August 10, 2025, President Donald Trump announced plans to place the local police department under the federal control in an effort to fight crime in D.C. Following the announcement, he mobilized the National Guard. On August 15, D.C. attorney general Brian Schwalb filed a lawsuit in the D.C. District Court, seeking an emergency restraining order against what the lawsuit described as a "hostile takeover" of the police department.

=== Court system ===
The Superior Court of the District of Columbia hears all local civil and criminal cases in Washington, D.C. Although the court is technically a branch of the D.C. government, the Superior Court is funded and operated by the U.S. federal government. In addition, the court's judges are appointed by the President of the United States. The D.C. Superior Court should not, however, be confused with the United States District Court for the District of Columbia, which only hears cases dealing with violations of federal law.

The District of Columbia has a complicated criminal prosecution system. The Attorney General of the District of Columbia only has jurisdiction in civil proceedings and prosecuting minor offenses such as low-level misdemeanors and traffic violations. All federal offenses, local felony charges (i.e. serious crimes such as robbery, murder, aggravated assault, grand theft, and arson), and most local misdemeanors are prosecuted by the United States Attorney for the District of Columbia. United States Attorneys are appointed by the President and overseen by the United States Department of Justice. This differs from elsewhere in the country where 93% of local prosecutors are directly elected and the remainder are appointed by local elected officials.

The fact that the U.S. Attorneys in the District of Columbia are neither elected nor appointed by city officials leads to criticism that the prosecutors are not responsive to the needs of residents. For example, new felony prosecutions by the U.S. Attorneys in the District of Columbia have fallen 34%; from 8,016 in 2003 to 5,256 in 2007. The number of resolved felony cases has also fallen by nearly half, from 10,206 in 2003 to 5,534 in 2007. In contrast, the number of misdemeanor and civil cases prosecuted and resolved by the D.C. Attorney General's office has remained constant over the same period. The U.S. Attorney for the District of Columbia cites the drop in prosecutions to a 14% cut in its budget. The cuts have caused the office to decrease the number of federal prosecutors from a high of 110 in 2003 to 76 in 2007.

Efforts to create the position of D.C. district attorney regained attention in 2008. The D.C. district attorney would be elected and have jurisdiction over all local criminal cases, thereby streamlining prosecution and making the justice system more accountable to residents. However, progress to institute such an office has stalled in Congress.

=== Prison system ===
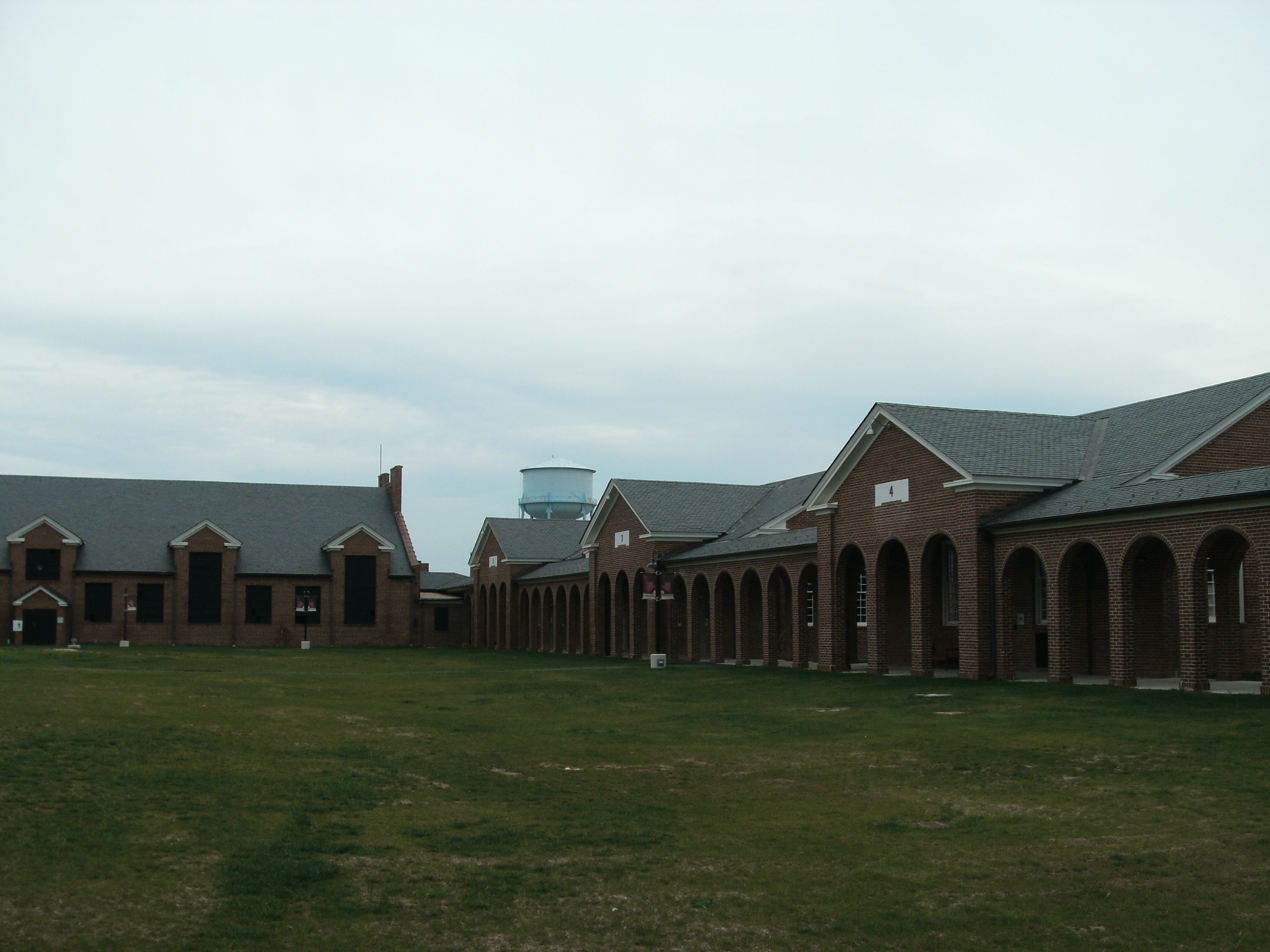
Until 2000, felons convicted of violating DC law were housed at Lorton Correctional Complex.

Under the National Capital Revitalization and Self-Government Improvement Act of 1997, prisoners who committed felony offenses are put under the custody of the Federal Bureau of Prisons (BOP); the Lorton Correctional Complex, a prison operated by the District government in Lorton, Virginia, was closed in 2000. Offenders serving short sentences for misdemeanors serve time either at the Central Detention Facility or the Correctional Treatment Facility, both run by the District of Columbia Department of Corrections.

Approximately 6,500 prisoners convicted in the District of Columbia are sent to Bureau of Prisons facilities around the United States, including over 1,000 sent to West Virginia, and another 1,000 to North Carolina. The Court Services and Offender Supervision Agency was established, under the National Capital Revitalization and Self-Government Improvement Act, to oversee probationers and parolees, and provide pretrial services. The functions were previously handled by the D.C. Superior Court and the D.C. Pretrial Services Agency.

As of 2007, almost 7,000 prisoners sentenced in District of Columbia courts had been imprisoned in 75 prisons in 33 states. As of 2010, 5,700 prisoners sentenced in DC courts had been imprisoned in federal-owned or leased properties in 33 states. As of 2010, felons sentenced under D.C. law altogether made up almost 8,000 prisoners or about 6% of the total BOP population, and they resided in 90 facilities. As of 2013 about 20% of the DC-sentenced prisoners were incarcerated over 500 miles (800 km) from Washington, D.C.

Rivers Correctional Institution, a private prison in North Carolina, was purpose-built to house D.C. inmates. As of 2007, about 66% of the prisoners were DC-sentenced inmates. In 2009 the prison housed about 800-900 prisoners sentenced under DC law. As of 2013, up to about 33% of the prisoners at United States Penitentiary, Big Sandy in Kentucky had been convicted of DC crimes.

Juveniles who are not charged as adults are not in DOC custody. Boys and girls charged as juveniles are detained at the D.C. Youth Services Center (a youth detention center run by the Department of Youth Rehabilitation Services) on Mount Olivet Road in Northeast Washington). The New Beginnings Youth Development Center is DC's secure facility for adjudicated youth, located in Maryland City, Maryland.

== Gun laws ==
Washington, D.C., versus U.S. homicide rate over time

Washington, D.C., has enacted some strict gun-restriction laws. The Firearms Control Regulations Act of 1975 prohibited residents from owning handguns, excluding those registered before February 5, 1977; however, this law was subsequently overturned in March 2007 by the United States Court of Appeals for the District of Columbia Circuit in Parker v. District of Columbia.

The ruling was upheld in June 2008 by the Supreme Court of the United States in District of Columbia v. Heller. Both courts held that the city's handgun ban violated the right to keep and bear arms as protected under the Second Amendment. The ruling did not strike down existing district laws requiring firearm registration and an assault weapon ban.

Since then, D.C. has further reduced gun control in several steps in 2009, 2012, 2015, 2016, and 2017. See Gun laws in the District of Columbia. The District reduced the cost of the permitting process, reduced ammunition control laws, removed a re-registration application, and changed its concealed-carry licensing regime to "shall issue", as ordered by federal courts.
