= Alice Gram Robinson =

American suffragist

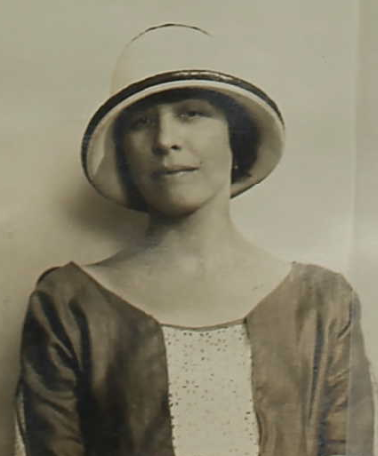
- Alice Gram Robinson, from her 1923 passport application
- Born: March 16, 1895; Omaha, Nebraska
- Died: January 24, 1984 (aged 88); Warrenton, Virginia
- Occupations: Suffragist, journalist, editor
- Relatives: Betty Gram Swing (sister); Raymond Gram Swing (brother-in-law)

Alice M. Gram Robinson (March 16, 1895 – January 24, 1984) was an American suffragist, journalist, and editor. She was the founder, editor, publisher, and longtime president of the Congressional Digest.

== Early life and education ==
Alice M. Gram was born in Omaha, Nebraska and raised in Oregon, the daughter of Andreas (Andrew) Peter Gram and Karen (Carrie) Jensen. Her parents were immigrants from Denmark. Her older sister Betty Gram Swing was a suffragist. She and her sister both attended the University of Oregon, and both were members of Kappa Alpha Theta.

== Career ==
Gram was a student in 1917 when she traveled to Washington, D.C. as a member of the College Equal Suffrage League, and was arrested for obstructing traffic while carrying a banner at a National Woman's Party Silent Sentinels demonstration. She and her sister both served more than a week at Occoquan Workhouse, before they were pardoned by President Woodrow Wilson. Gram stayed in Washington, first working for the National Woman's Party, and in 1919 as one of the co-founders of the Women's National Press Club, along with Cora Rigby, Carolyn Vance Bell, Elizabeth King, Florence Brewer Boeckel, and Eleanor Nelson.

Gram founded The Capitol Eye (soon retitled Congressional Digest) in 1921, initially to help new women voters understand legislative issues by presenting arguments regarding bills dealing with public health and education in a side-by-side, pro/con format. She was president of the Congressional Digest until 1983, when her son took over the publication. In 1928 she was director of the Women's Division of the Republican National Committee.

== Personal life ==
Gram married fellow journalist Norbonne T. Robinson Jr. in 1922, and had a son, Norbonne III. The Robinsons divorced in 1945, and her ex-husband died in 1947. She died from cancer in 1984, in Warrenton, Virginia, at the age of 88. There is a small collection of her papers at the Schlesinger Library.
