= Cora Rigby =

American journalist (1865–1930)

- Born: February 11, 1865; Lancaster, Ohio, U.S.
- Died: June 11, 1930 (aged 65)
- Education: Western Seminary; Ohio State University; Boston University
- Occupation: Journalist
- Organizations: Women's National Press Club; American Association of University Women
- Known for: First head of a Washington News bureau (The Christian Science Monitor); Co-founder and President of the Women's National Press Club

Cora Rigby (February 11, 1865 – June 11, 1930) was an American journalist who was the first woman at a major newspaper to head a Washington News bureau, and was one of the founders of the Women's National Press Club, where she served as its president.

== Biography ==
Cora Rigby was born in Lancaster, Ohio, where her father William L. Rigby was a judge. She went to school at Western Seminary, Ohio State University, and Boston University, before returning home to Columbus, Ohio where her parents were living. While in Columbus she decided she wanted to write a political column for a local newspaper in the city. At first the editor of the paper was scandalized by the idea of a woman writing about politics in a newspaper, and sent her home. However, she returned the next day with a column ready to print; which after reading, he did, but without her name attached. She worked unpaid for a time, but at one point rumors leaked that the column was being written by William Rigby's daughter, so he came to the newsroom and removed her, taking her home and telling her mother to take better care of her. The next day though, Cora was back at the paper writing about politics again. The column became so popular and authoritative that rumors started that the Governor's secretary was writing it. Eventually she started getting paid for her work. At one point she asked for her own desk and when she was told there wasn't one available, she went over to an empty desk and made it her own. Among her political positions, she was a vocal supporter of the women's suffrage movement, and later became a member of the American Association of University Women.

Rigby decided to move to Boston, and then to New York, in order to find harder assignments than what was available in Columbus. She ended up working for the New York Herald for fifteen years. James Gordon Bennett Jr., the owner and publisher of the Herald disapproved of women in positions of trust, but she eventually won his favor. Rigby then moved on to The Christian Science Monitor, where she spent the rest of her career. In her job at the Monitor in 1918, Rigby became one of the first full-time professional women journalists to work as a Washington correspondent; and in 1919, she, along with nine other women and 100 men, were accredited to cover to the United States House and Senate in the press gallery. In 1922 she was given control over the Monitor's Washington News Bureau, becoming the first woman at a major paper to hold such a role.

At the time, the Washington-based National Press Club did not allow women as members, (Note: The National Press Club voted to admit women in 1971. The Women’s National Press Club responded by voting to admit men and changed its name to the Washington Press Club. It continued to function separately for a few years until in 1985 the two groups merged.) so Rigby organized the Women's National Press Club with five other women: journalists Elizabeth King and Carolyn Vance Bell, and suffragists Alice Gram Robinson, Florence Brewer Boeckel, and Eleanor Taylor Nelson. The group met at first in Rigby's office at the Monitor, and Rigby became the club's first president, a position which she held for three successive terms. She saw the club's purpose as to counter “the conspiracy of men to keep women off the newspapers—or at least to reduce their number, wages, and importance.” Eleanor Roosevelt was a major supporter of the group.

At the time of her death in 1930, Rigby was still the only woman to have headed a Washington news bureau. She was highly respected by other journalists in Washington, and according to journalist Ishbel Ross, she was "the woman who did more than any other to break down prejudice against newspaper women in Washington." Journalist Erwin Canham called her "one of the great pioneers in women's journalism."
