= Rivers Correctional Institution =

Privately owned prison in North Carolina, United States

Coordinates: 36°24′18″N 76°57′32″W

- Interactive map of Rivers Correctional Institution
- Location: 145 Parker's Fishery Road Winton, North Carolina postal address
- Status: open
- Security class: low security
- Capacity: 1450
- Opened: 2001
- Managed by: GEO Group

Rivers Correctional Institution is a privately owned prison in an unincorporated in Hertford County, North Carolina, operated by GEO Group. The prison, on 257 acres (104 ha) of land, was specially built to house prisoners from the District of Columbia. It is about 1 mile (1.6 km) from the town of Winton and about 200 miles (320 km) from Washington, D.C. It was initially under contract with the Federal Bureau of Prisons when it was constructed in 2001.

== History ==
The first inmates were transferred from the Lorton Reformatory of the District of Columbia Department of Corrections, which closed in 2001. Under the National Capital Revitalization and Self-Government Improvement Act of 1997, offenders of the District of Columbia at Rivers and elsewhere serve time in FBOP custody; they committed no federal crime but instead had committed DC crimes. Most prisoners stay around two years and had been sent to Rivers because they violated parole conditions and/or committed drug offenses. As of 2007 DC inmates made up about 66% of the about 1,400 prisoners. In 2009 the prison housed about 800-900 prisoners sentenced under DC law. In addition, the prison also houses non-U.S. citizens who were convicted of violating federal law. As of 2009 the prison had about 400-500 foreign prisoners, and in 2007 about 200 of the prisoners were nationals of Mexico.

In 2009, there was one on-site physician in the prison. No on-site medical service was provided, and the doctor worked fewer than 40 hours per week. Comparably-sized BOP facilities had at least two full-time physicians and weekend on-site medical services.

Robert E. Pierre of The Washington Post wrote in 2007 that due to the lack of job opportunities and drug treatment, Rivers "has become a symbol for what inmates, their families and city leaders say is harsher treatment of D.C. inmates in federal prisons compared with other inmates." In 2009 Philip Fornaci, the director of the DC Prisoners' Project, described the medical care at Rivers as "abysmal". Fornaci recalled receiving complaints shortly after the facility opened in 2002. The Washington Lawyers' Committee, with help from Covington & Burling, filed a class action lawsuit Collins et al. v. GEO Group et al, Civ. No. 08-CV-00021-H, ED North Carolina in regards to the medical situation. Both the BOP and GEO blamed each other for the situation, stating that each other agency is responsible.

In August 2016, Justice Department officials announced that the FBOP would be phasing out its use of contracted facilities, because private prisons provided less safe and less effective services with no substantial cost savings. The agency had expected to allow current contracts on its thirteen remaining private facilities to expire. Attorney General Jeff Sessions criticized the August 2016 decision and reversed it on February 22, 2017. The prison's contract is expected to be renewed as it approaches expiration. The Biden administration decided not to renew the contract which expired on March 31, 2021.

== Notable inmates ==
- Joaquin Valencia-Trujillo - Former leader of the Cali Cartel in Colombia; extradited to the US in 2004; convicted in 2006 of drug trafficking conspiracy for directing the shipment of more than 100 tons of cocaine a year into the US over a ten-year period. He is scheduled to be released on 12/06/2037.
