= Lorton Reformatory =

Historic prison in Virginia, United States

Coordinates: 38.69805°N 77.25483°W

- D.C. Workhouse and Reformatory Historic District
- U.S. National Register of Historic Places
- U.S. Historic district
- Virginia Landmarks Register
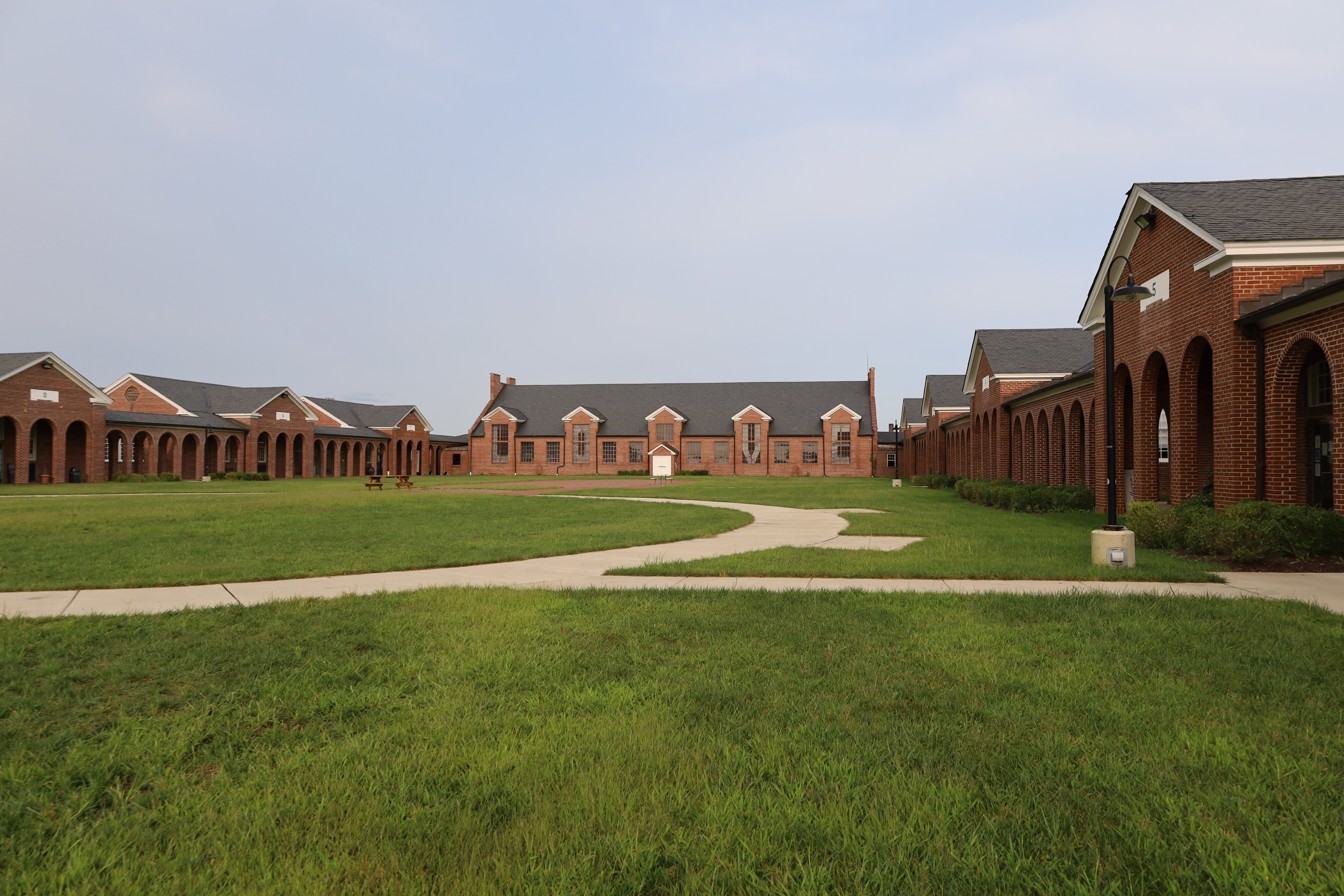
- Main quad in 2020

- Location within Northern Virginia Location within Virginia Location within the United States
- Location: Laurel Hill, Virginia
- Area: 511.3 acres (206.9 ha)
- Built: 1910
- Architects: Snowden Ashford; Albert Harris
- Architectural style: Colonial Revival, Beaux Arts
- NRHP reference No.: 06000052
- VLR No.: 029-0947

Significant dates
- Added to NRHP: February 16, 2006
- Designated VLR: December 7, 2005, March 27, 2012

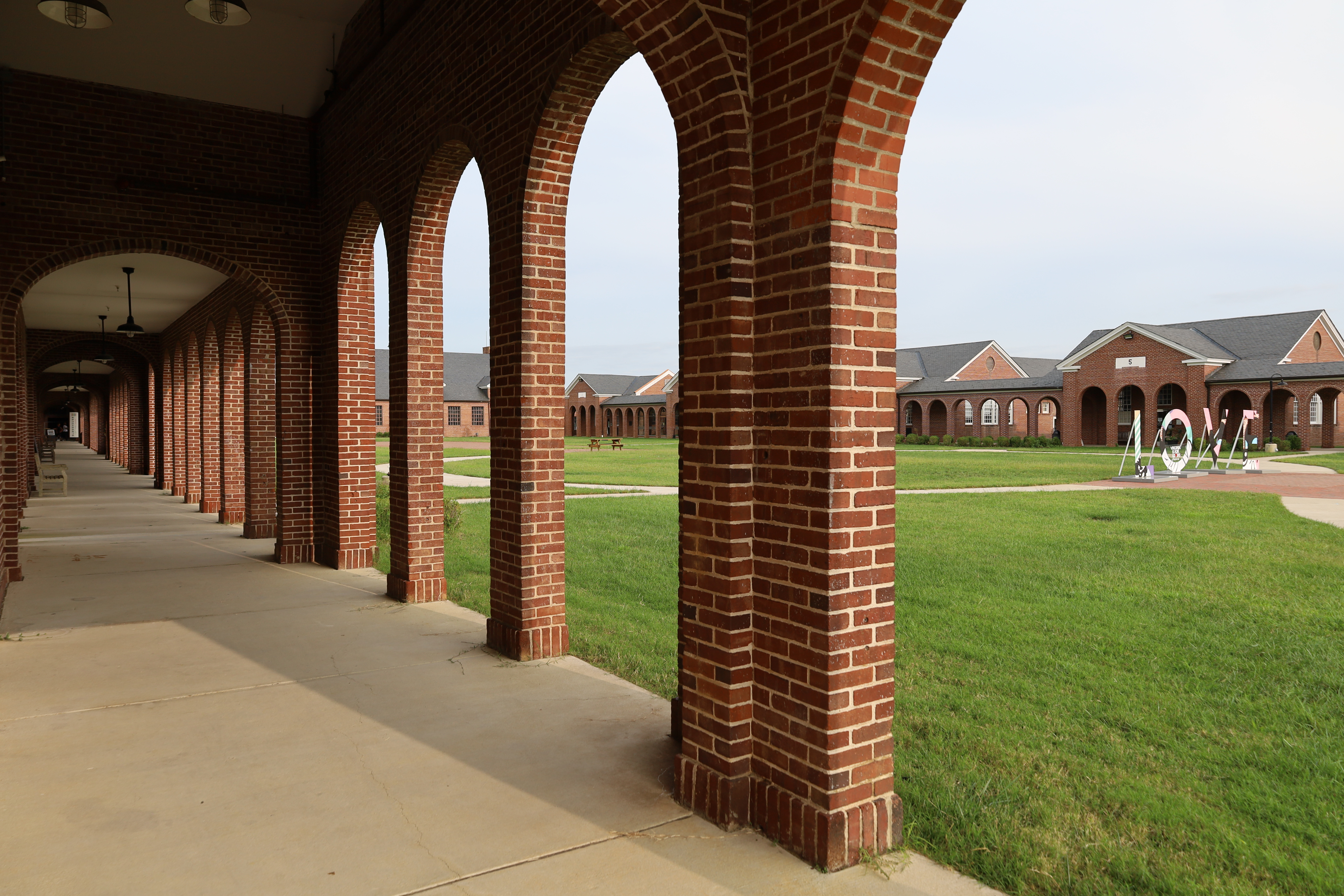
An arcade in the main quad

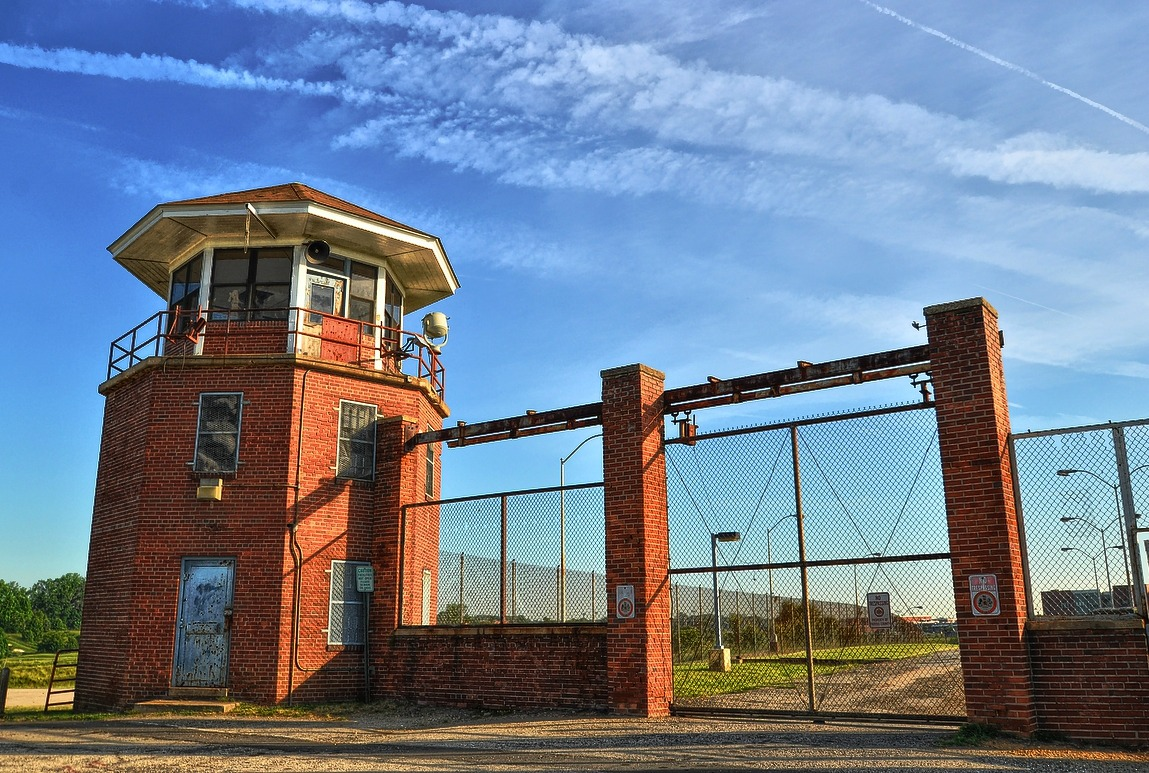
A guard tower

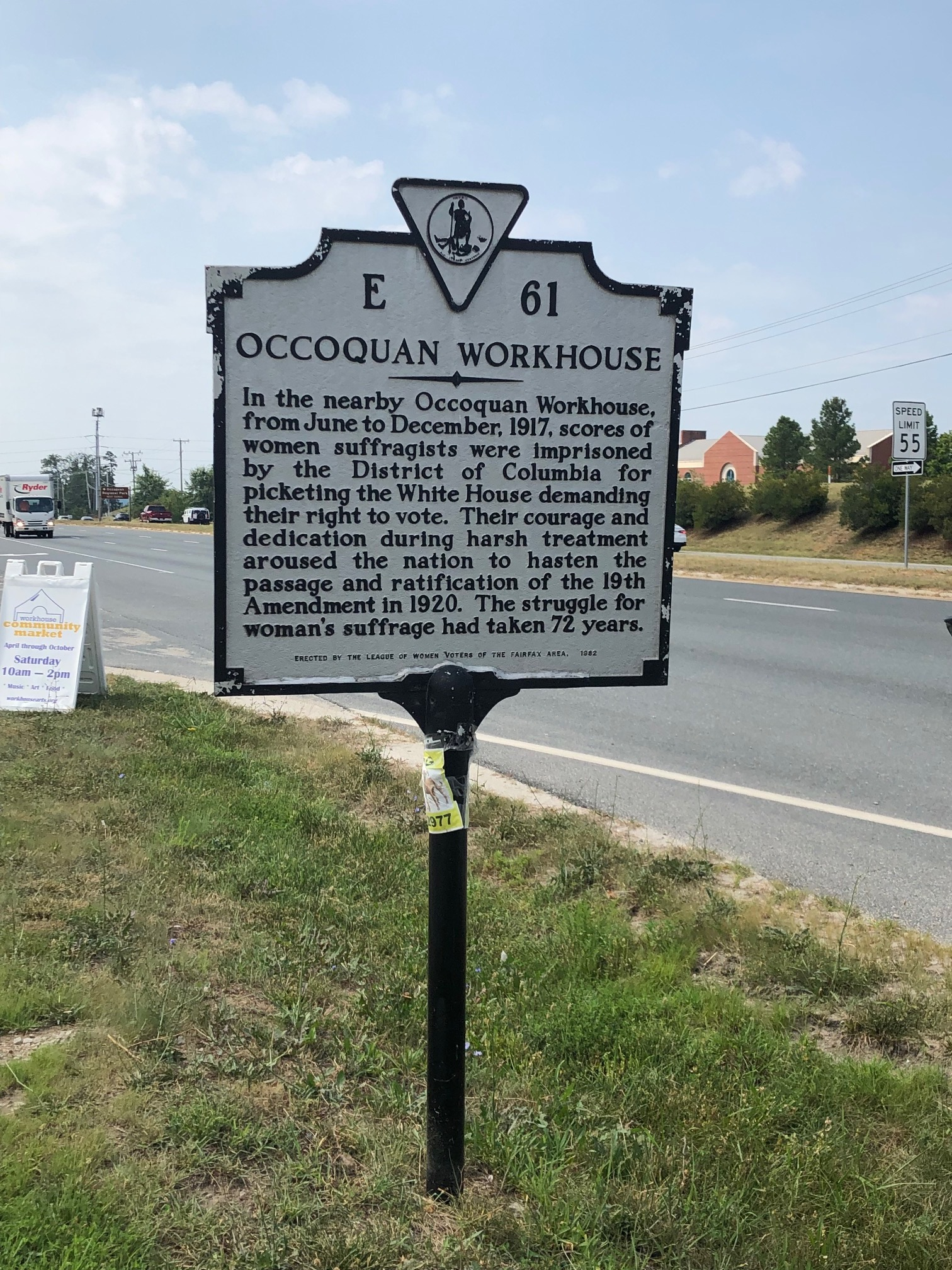
A historic marker in front of the Workhouse recognizing the contributions of suffragists to the passage of the 19th Amendment

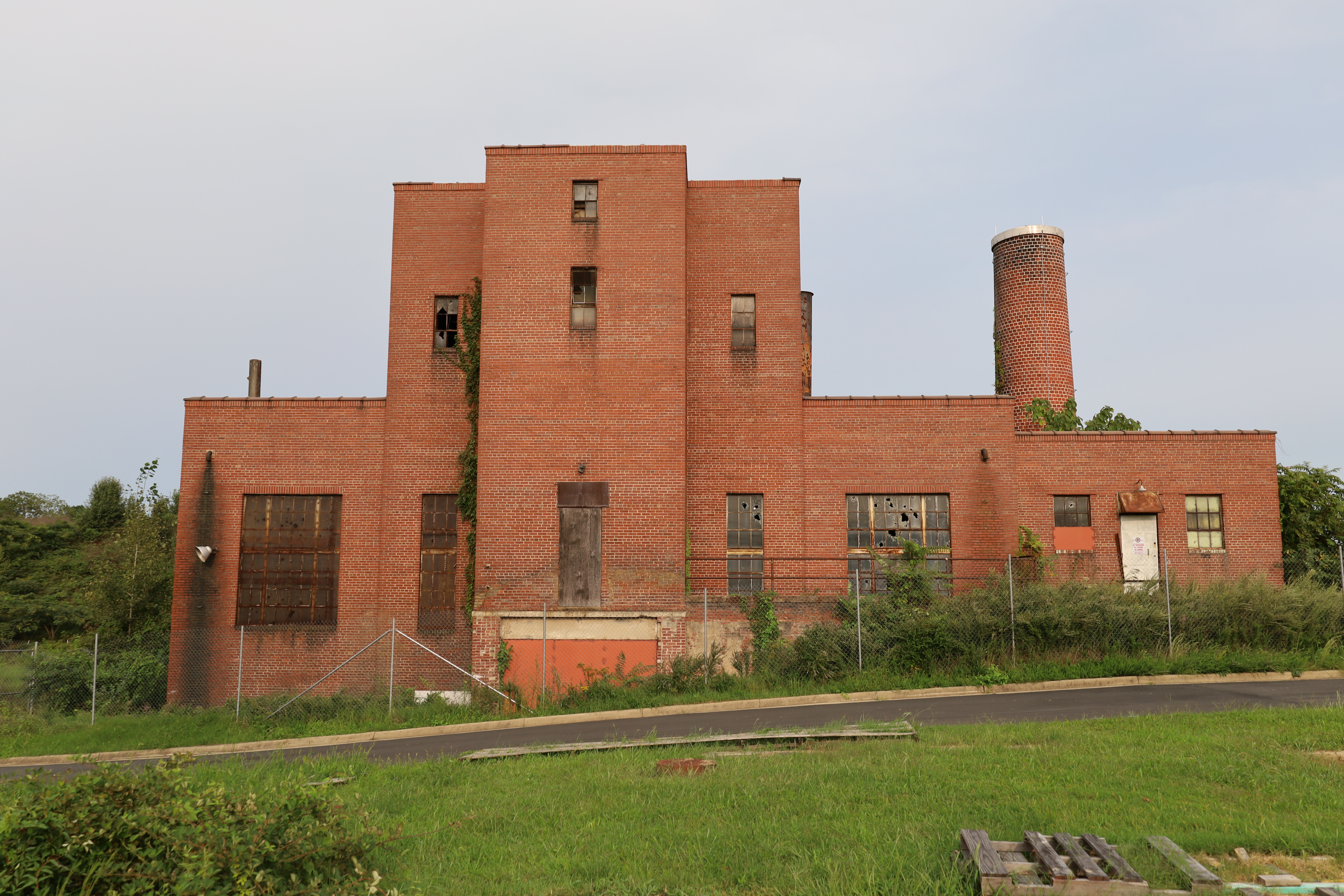
An outbuilding

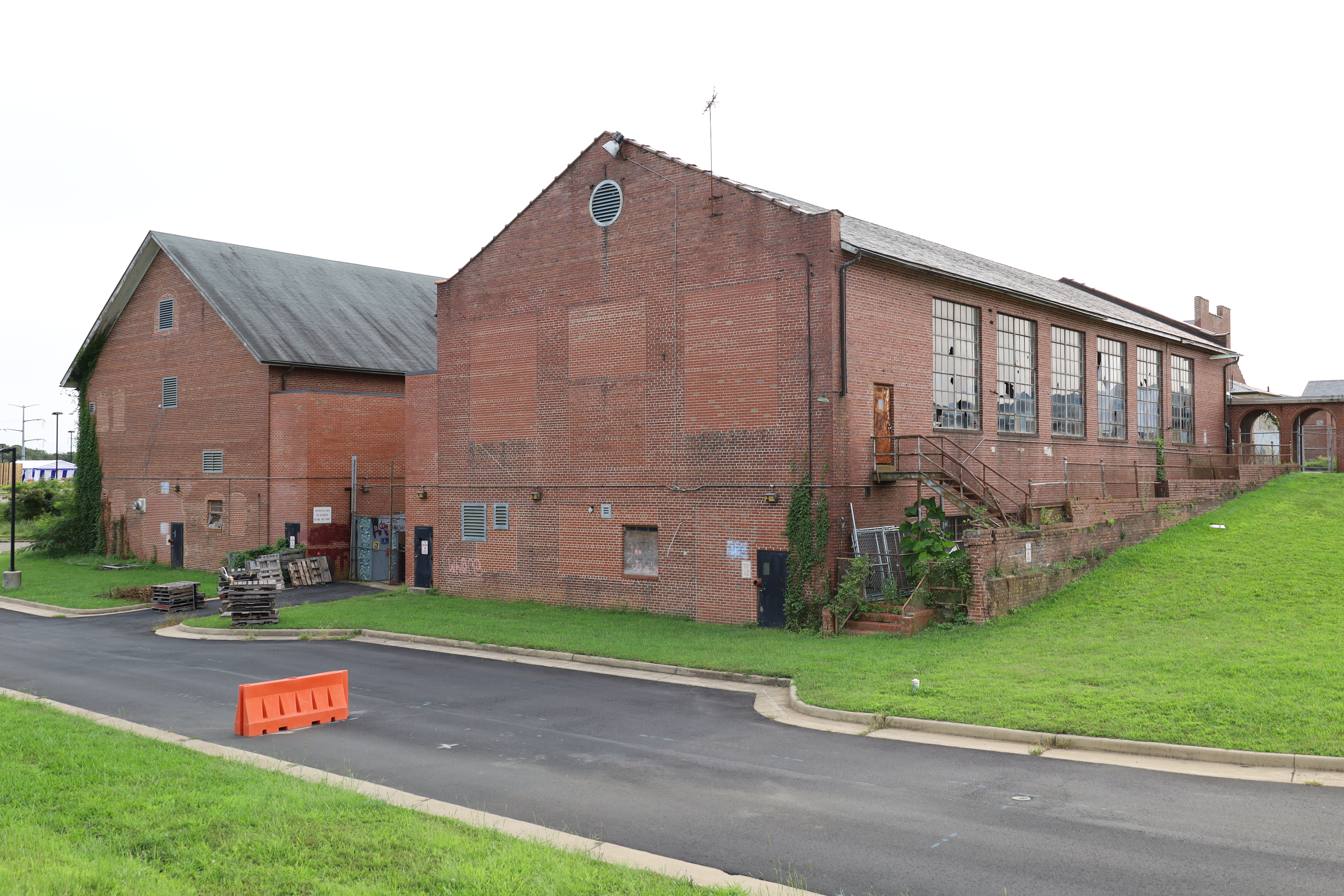
Outbuildings

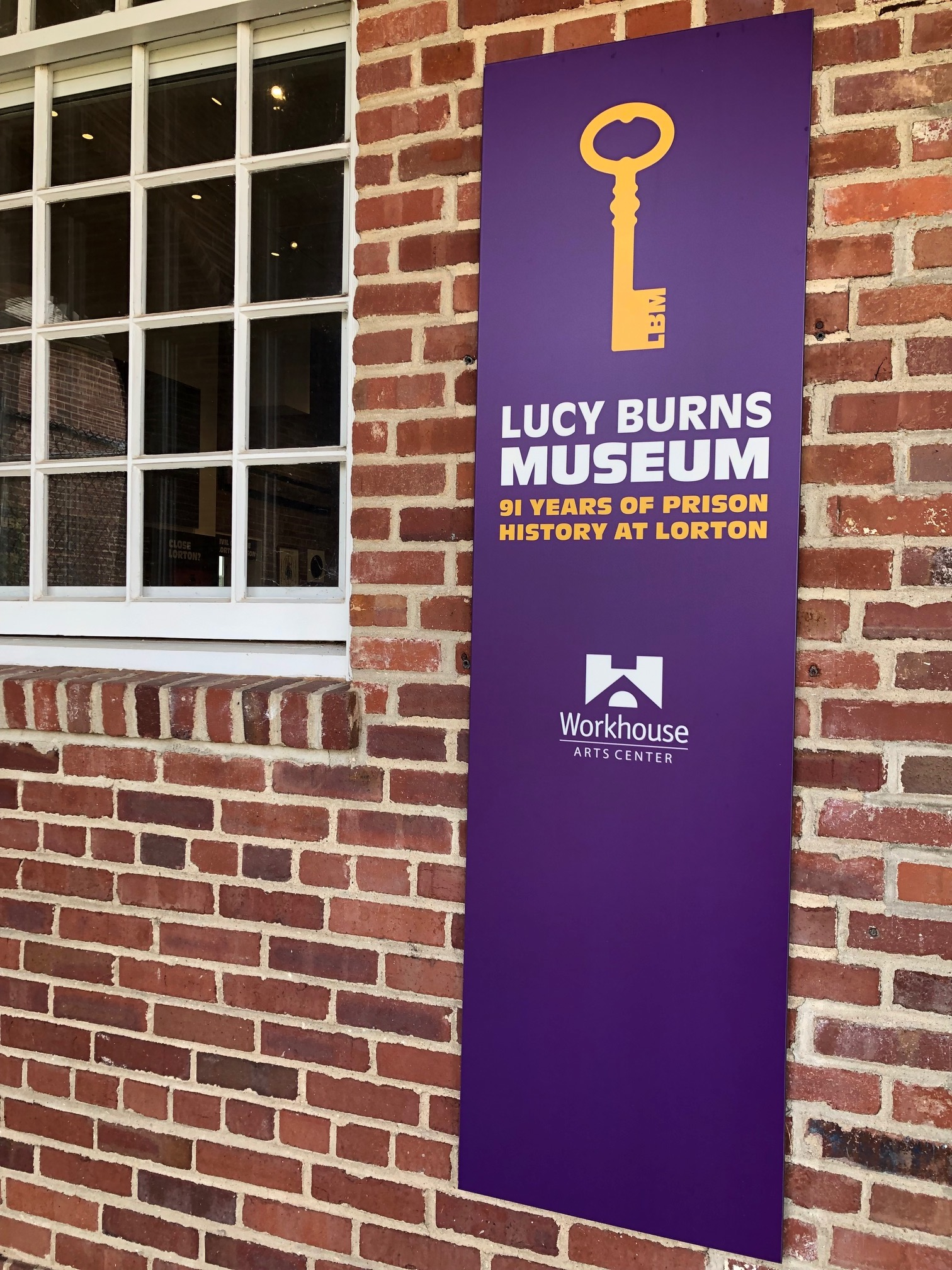
The Lucy Burns Museum

The Lorton Reformatory, also known as the Lorton Correctional Complex, is a former prison complex in Lorton, Virginia, established in 1910 for the District of Columbia, United States.

The complex began as a prison farm called the Occoquan Workhouse for nonviolent offenders serving short sentences. The District established an adjacent reformatory in 1914, and then a 10-acre (4.0 ha) walled penitentiary constructed by inmates from 1931 through 1938, as a division of the reformatory with heightened security. The complex came under the administration of the District of Columbia Department of Corrections when it was formed in 1946.

After further expansions, a peak size of 3,500-acre (1,400 ha), and 92 years of service, the facility was ordered closed in the late 1990s. The final prisoners were transferred out in November 2001.

Lorton was also the site of a bunker used by the government from 1959 to 2001 that housed emergency communications equipment to be used in the event of a war with the Soviet Union. Lorton Reformatory also hosted Nike missile site W-64.

== History ==
Near the reformatory lies Revolutionary War patriot William Lindsay's c. 1790 estate known as Laurel Hill. This house served as a residence for the reformatory superintendent.

In 1908, President Theodore Roosevelt appointed a special Penal Commission to investigate deplorable conditions of the District of Columbia's jail and workhouse in Washington. As a result, the Commission recommended a complete change in the philosophy and treatment of prisoners in D.C. The United States Congress acted upon this recommendation, and a 1,155-acre (5 km^{2}) tract north of the Occoquan River was purchased in 1910 through condemnation proceedings.

District architect Snowden Ashford drew plans for the workhouse in 1910, while Leon E. Dessez was the special architect appointed by the commissioners to draft plans for the new workhouse. It opened in 1916 as a facility for less serious offenders in the Lorton Correctional Complex, with classically inspired, symmetrical dormitory complexes.

From 1911 the complex had its own railroad, the Lorton and Occoquan Railroad that operated until 1977.

From June to November 1917, a number of nationally prominent suffragists were arrested from their Silent Sentinels pickets of the White House at the White House, and held at the Occoquan Workhouse. Approximately 168 women, most from the National Woman's Party, experienced mistreatment at the workhouse. Some were force-fed after they began hunger strikes. The night of November 14, 1917, is known as the "Night of Terror" because of how badly the suffragist prisoners were tortured, beaten, and abused. Portrayals of events at the Occoquan Workhouse played a key part in the 2004 film Iron Jawed Angels, a film about the history of the National Woman's Party, Alice Paul, Lucy Burns, and other members of the 1910s Women's Voting Rights Movement.

The penitentiary buildings of the 1930s were constructed by the prisoners themselves, using brick manufactured at the on-site kiln complex from Occoquan River clay. Initially only the maximum security section was fenced, but fences were established for other sections in the 1970s due to area politicians calling for the closing of the prison and increased concerns over prison escapes. A series of prison riots plagued the facility in the 1970s and 1980s, including an incident in 1974 where 100 armed inmates took 10 guards hostage, and a riot in 1986 during which 14 buildings were set on fire.

The Youth Center, housing 18-22 year old prisoners, opened in 1960 and was established due to the post-World War II era anti-juvenile delinquency law Federal Youth Corrections Act of 1950. It was located next to the Fairfax County Landfill and in proximity to the prison's dairy farm. The initial concept was that the young prisoners could acquire a trade and/or get an education and then have their records expunged. Initially the prisoners carried books entitled "So We All Understand" and wore suits and ties. The building was designed to resemble a campus of a university, and it used open plan dormitories. At some point older adult felons began to be housed alongside the younger prisoners. Eddie Dean of the Washington City Paper stated that the center became "a sort of parody of its original inception". According to Dean, at one time it was the "murder capital" of Lorton, but by 1997 the Youth Center became "a relatively calm and safe compound, especially compared with the Quack."

It became known in its later years, however, as an outdated and badly overcrowded facility. The last prisoners were removed from Lorton Reformatory late in 2001. As a result of the National Capital Revitalization and Self-Government Improvement Act of 1997, felons from the District of Columbia began going to Federal Bureau of Prisons facilities.

On July 15, 2002, the property was sold to Fairfax County. The transfer was enabled by the Lorton Technical Corrections Act passed by Congress in October 1998. It required the county to develop a plan to maximize use of land for open space, parkland or recreation prior to the transfer. The site has been part of the D.C. Workhouse and Reformatory Historic District since February 16, 2006.

== Cultural Arts Center and Housing ==
In 2002, The Lorton Arts Foundation sought to reuse the property of the former prison. The idea was to reconstruct and repair the prison facility and transform it into a Cultural Arts Center, to be known as the Workhouse Arts Center. Of course, much had to be altered to serve in such a capacity. In 2004, approval from The Fairfax County Board of Supervisors allowed the project to get under way. Soon after the decision was made to repurpose the land and old historic buildings, restoration began. Walls were repaired, rooms were completely cleared, and the tall fences around the property were taken down.

In 2008, the Arts Center was ready to be used by the public after four years to build and restore six separate buildings, repurposing them into headquarters for hobbies and activities, such as ceramics, photography, painting, theatre and film, which are accessible by the public within the center. Classes for most of the categories are available. The Arts Center also houses famous pieces of art by local artists, who have visited the center to teach and to present their work. Over 800 different art classes are available.

Along with the Workhouse Arts Center, the former prison yard has now become home to baseball and soccer fields. With much ground still available, plans are in place to add more athletic fields. Many attend a yearly walk through the old grounds, and stages have been set up to host local theater organizations. Walk-throughs and tours were offered before the restoration began in 2004 to view rooms such as the cafeteria, Warden's office, shower room, and cell dorms. Guard towers still surround the grounds.

A New York Times article cited the redevelopment of the site as a national model for the creative redevelopment of closed prisons, noting "The county gradually turned the property into a park and golf course, three schools and an arts center. . . .The complex now includes 165 apartments, of which 98 percent are leased; 157 town homes; and 24 single-family homes, as well as commercial spaces. In 2017, tenants started moving in, many attracted by amenities like a swimming pool, 24-hour gym and yoga room."

=== Lucy Burns Museum ===
A museum in honor of suffragist Lucy Burns from the National Woman's Party opened in 2020. The Museum hosts celebrations for Women's Equality Day each year in August.

== Notable prisoners ==
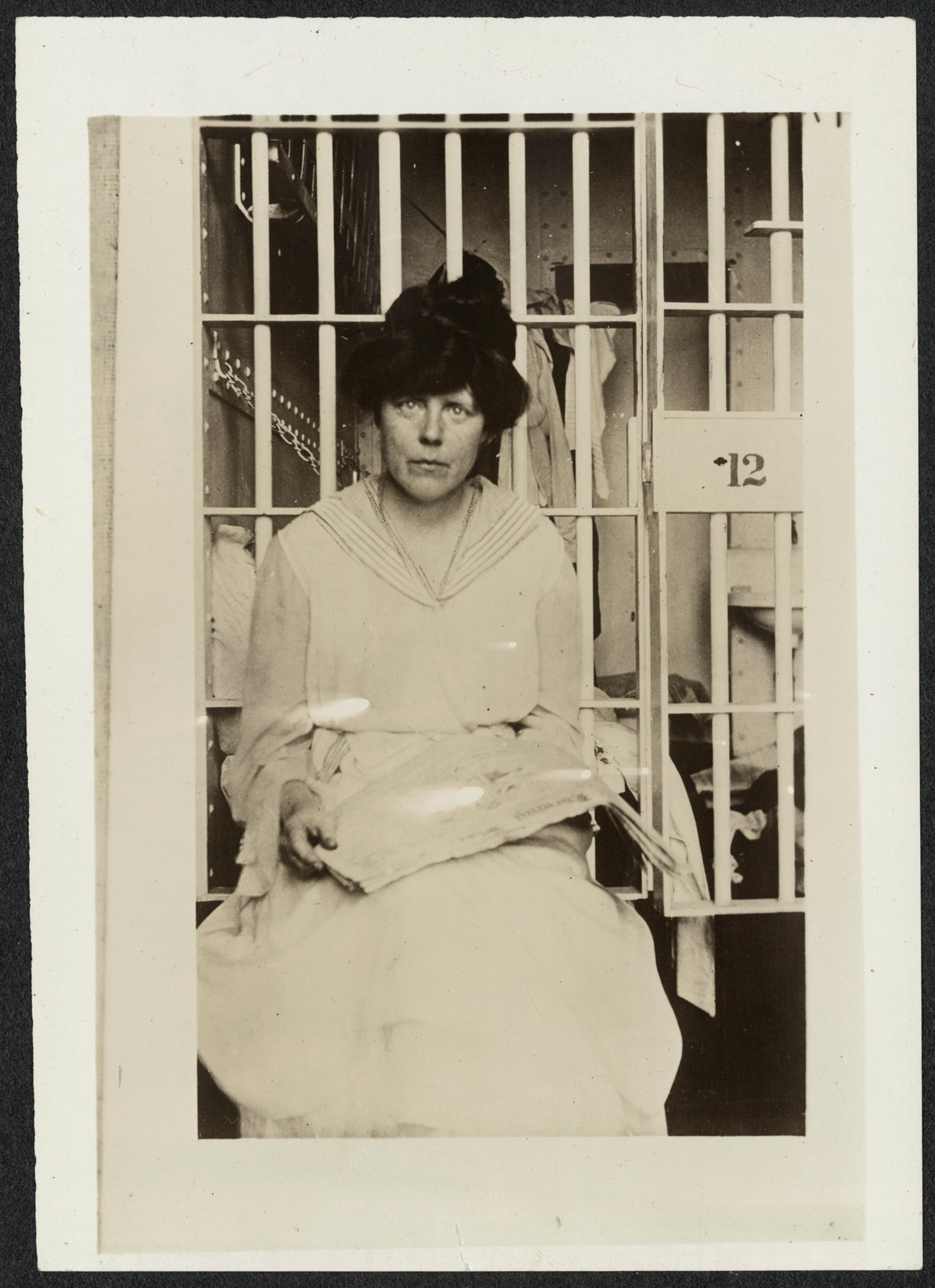
Suffragist Lucy Burns imprisoned at Occoquan Workhouse, 1917

- Chuck Brown, musician, 1950s
- Lucy Burns, suffragist and women's rights advocate, 1917
- Iris Calderhead, suffragist and women's rights advocate, 1917
- Gertrude Crocker, suffragist and women's rights advocate, 1917
- Petey Greene, television and radio talk-show host, 1960s
- Alison Turnbull Hopkins, suffragist and women's rights activist, 1917
- Paula O. Jakobi, suffragist and women's rights activist, 1917
- Dora Lewis, suffragist and women's rights activist, 1917
- Anne Henrietta Martin, suffragist and women's rights activist, 1917
- Alice Paul, suffragist and women's rights activist, 1917
- Alice Gram Robinson, suffragist and founder of Congressional Digest, 1917
- Elizabeth Selden Rogers, suffragist and education advocate, 1917
- Doris Stevens, suffragist, author, and women's rights activist, 1917
- Betty Gram Swing, suffragist and women's rights activist, 1917
- Amelia Himes Walker, suffragist and women's rights activist, 1917
- Ruza Wenclawska, suffragist, factory inspector, trade union organizer, actress, and poet, 1914

== See also ==
- Crime in Washington, D.C.
