= Workhouse Arts Center =

Historic buildings in Virginia, US

Coordinates: 38°41′53.1″N 77°15′17.2″W

- District of Columbia Workhouse and Reformatory Historic District
- U.S. National Register of Historic Places
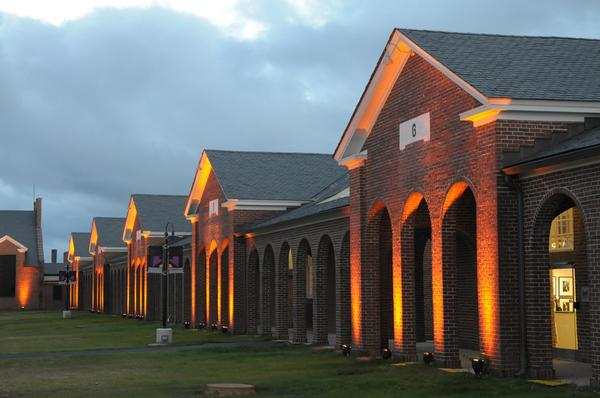
- Location: 9518 Workhouse Rd, Lorton, VA 22079
- Coordinates: 38°41'53.1"N 77°15'17.2"W
- Area: 511.32 acres (206.92 ha)
- Built: 1910
- Architect: Snowden Ashford, Albert Harris
- Architectural style: Late 19th and 20th Century Revivals: Beaux Arts; Colonial Revival. Late 19th and early 20th Century American Movements: Bungalow/Craftsman.
- NRHP reference No.: 06000052
- Added to NRHP: February 16, 2006

The Workhouse Arts Center in Lorton, Virginia is a 55-acre center for the arts and arts education that, through adaptive reuse, utilizes existing structures on repurposed land in the former Lorton Reformatory. A strong community partner with a growing national reputation, the Workhouse hosts celebrations, offers space for special events, and showcases Fairfax County's commitment to the arts. The Workhouse is a 501(c)3 non-profit organization and relies on the generosity of WAC partners and community.

Once surrounded by barbed wire fence, the Workhouse Arts Center is now an open arts center. Artists rent studio space, actors perform on the stage, students of all ages take classes from dance to blacksmithing on an arcaded campus built on the same Jeffersonian plan of linked pavilions as found on the main grounds of the University of Virginia. The center hosts an annual Fourth of July fireworks festival, Brewfest, and Halloween "Haunt". The most recent addition is the Lucy Burns Museum, which tells the 91-year history of the District of Columbia's Correctional Facility and honors the suffragists who were imprisoned there in 1917.

== Arts and arts education ==
Pavilions that once housed prisoners have now been renovated to provide room for up to 80 artists in open studios. The artists create in a variety of media, including painting and drawing, ceramics, photography, glass, metal, fiber, and more. The pavilions are open to visitors of all ages from Wednesday through Sunday, and each building hosts a monthly second Saturday art walk.

Classroom space allows for arts education in most of the visual arts disciplines, as well as in several dance styles and exercise methods like yoga, rowing, jazzercise and Pilates. Cooking classes take place in a demonstration kitchen. Studio instruction in piano, voice, cello and flute are available. Students from beginner to experts come to learn and study at the Workhouse.

The Workhouse Theater puts on four productions a year, to rave reviews. Their works range from popular musicals to thought-provoking modern works. Regular comedy nights and cabarets take place in the theater, and musical performances take place each Saturday evening on the Quad throughout the summer. Ballroom dancing is a popular event on select weekends in one of the main galleries.

== Lucy Burns Museum ==
In 1917, women picketed the White House in Washington, DC to demand the right to vote. Many were arrested and imprisoned in the Women's Workhouse. The museum honors Lucy Burns, the co-founder of the National Woman's Party and the most-arrested suffragist in the United States. During the infamous "Night of Terror" in November, 32 women were subjected to sadistic treatment by Workhouse guards. Some suffragists, including Lucy Burns, went on a hunger strike to protest their treatment, and were force-fed by their jailers.

== History ==
At the turn of the last century, the District of Columbia's prison was overcrowded and unsanitary. Interested in prison reforms, then-President Theodore Roosevelt appointed a panel to investigate. Among the findings was the conclusion that instead of sitting in idleness, prisoners could be taught a trade, bettering their future opportunities as they benefited local communities. The Workhouse concept gained support. Congress approved the purchase of 1,155 acres on the north bank of the Occoquan River in Virginia. The Workhouse was designed to rehabilitate and reform prisoners through fresh air, good food, honest work, and fair treatment. The first prisoners arrived in 1910 and in keeping with the movement in penal reform, they were put to work – first building wooden structures from timber on the property and then creating a brick kiln. Using local clay, the prisoners built the permanent brick dormitories. Once the buildings were finished, the Workhouse turned to agriculture. In the hopes that it could be self-sustaining, the Workhouse came to include cultivated fields, pasture lands, an orchard and cannery, a poultry farm, a hog ranch, a slaughterhouse, a dairy, a blacksmith shop, a sawmill to process the property's timber, and barns for feed, hay, and storage.

The District of Columbia's correctional complex increased to over 3,200 acres during its 91 years of operation. But by the late 1980s, (and in line with a national trend in correctional facility challenges), the prison was known more for over-crowding and disorganization, which led to prisoner protests, riots and fires rather than the rehabilitation intended by Roosevelt's commission. Federal legislation forced the closing of the prison; the last prisoner was transferred out in 2001.

Fairfax County bought 2,324 acres for $4.2 million in 2002, and began the work to convert the former prison into a cultural arts center. Two years later, the Board of Supervisors approved the rezoning of 55 acres (including the original Workhouse complex, based on a colonnaded Jeffersonian plan) to become the Workhouse Arts Center.
