= Betty Gram Swing =

American militant suffragist

- Born: Myrtle Eveline Gram; March 16, 1893
- Died: September 1, 1969 (aged 76)
- Education: University of Oregon
- Occupations: Politician, Suffragist
- Spouse: Raymond Gram Swing (m. 1921–1944) ending in divorce
- Relatives: Alice Gram Robinson (sister)

Betty Gram Swing, born Myrtle Eveline Gram (March 16, 1893 – September 1, 1969), was an American militant suffragist.

== Personal life ==
Betty Gram participated in landmark events of the women's rights movement in the early to mid-twentieth century. She joined the women's rights movement in 1917 and was subsequently jailed five times and went on two hunger strikes. When she was sent to Tennessee to push for the last vote needed to ratify the Nineteenth amendment, a local newspaper announced, “110 Pounds of Femininity Hit Memphis”. Contemporary newspaper accounts often noted her attractiveness. She remained active for many decades in women's rights and other causes. In 1921, Gram married well-known radio commentator Raymond Gram Swing. She insisted that he take her last name as well if she was taking his and became Betty Gram Swing. The couple were the parents of two sons and a daughter. They divorced in 1944.

== Suffrage activity, 1917-1919 ==
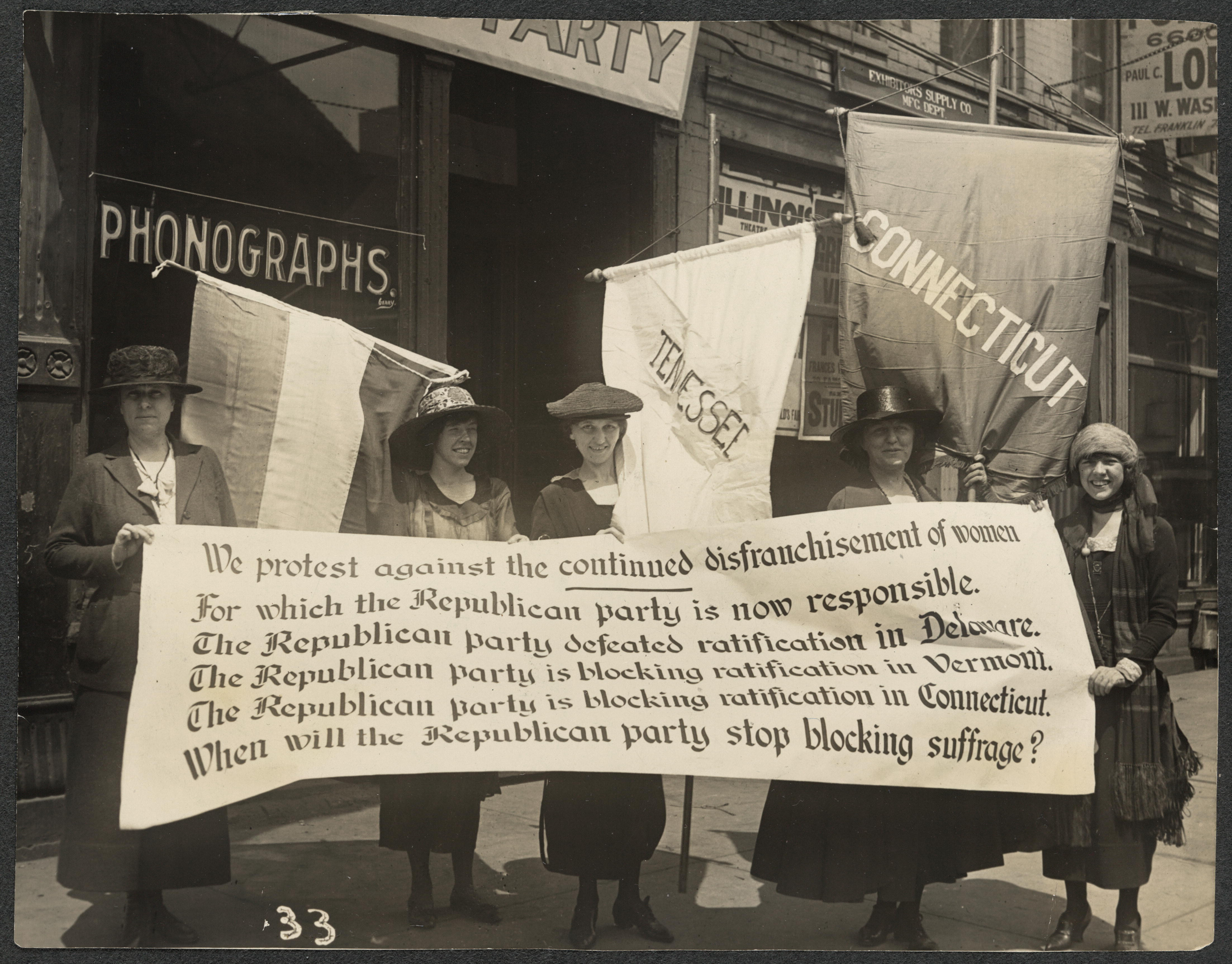
National Woman's Party members picketing the Republican convention, Chicago, June 1920. L-R Abby Scott Baker, Florence Taylor Marsh, Sue Shelton White, Elsie Hill, Betty Gram.

After graduating from the University of Oregon, Betty Gram embarked on a stage career, which she left when she came east to join the National Woman's Party (NWP), led by Alice Paul. The NWP had split with other women's suffrage groups over its focus on a constitutional amendment guaranteeing women the right to vote, as well as on its aggressive tactics. Other groups, namely the National American Woman's Suffrage Association, had built a state-by-state suffrage strategy and opposed the NWP's targeting of President Wilson and Democrats as well as its picketing effort.

The National Woman's Party began its Silent Sentinels picketing of the White House in January 1917. In March of that year, over one thousand women took part. By June, the White House decided to arrest the picketers. Since holding signs is not illegal, the women demanded to know the reason for their arrest. The eventual charge was obstructing traffic. Those charges were dismissed and no trial was held. But a new pattern had begun - the women picketers were not deterred. Upon their release, they went straight back to picketing the White House and were arrested again. A front-page photo in the Evening Tribune of San Diego bore the caption, "Washington has found that the only way to keep a picket away from the White House is to put her in jail." This time the picketers were found guilty of obstructing traffic and fined $25 or three days in jail. The women refused to pay the fine. A rapid escalation followed until the leader of the NWP, Alice Paul was sentenced to 7 months in jail. Betty and her sister, Alice Gram, and 39 others were jailed for obstructing traffic on November 10, 1917; that picket was part of a protest of Alice Paul's sentence. The charge of obstructing traffic was widely understood as a sham - the Oregonian newspaper clearly stated as much in an article covering the Gram sisters' arrest. In the same article, Betty was quoted as saying, "I am going to prison for the suffrage case, with the full knowledge that I have committed no offense."

Instead of being sent to the local jail, the November 10th picketers were sent to the Occoquan Workhouse in Virginia, where the inmates were forced to do prison labor. Horrible conditions faced the women in the workhouse - they were beaten, kept in isolation, and given rancid food. After being refused recognition as political prisoners, the women declared a hunger strike. The leaders of the NWP, including Alice Paul, were force fed. The Gram sisters were released after 17 days in jail, along with 22 other hunger strikers, although they had been sentenced to 30 days.

The arrests and hunger strike were widely covered in newspapers across the country and Betty was featured prominently. The Oregonian noted that, by the time they were released, Betty and Alice had lost 12 and 19 lbs respectively. But their arrests and ill-treatment did not deter the Grams or the other picketers, who continue pressuring President Wilson and Congress to take up a constitutional amendment granting women the right to vote. In January 1919, Betty Gram was one of two sentries outside the White House standing guard over a bonfire in which they burned President Wilson's speeches. The next month she was arrested in Boston when 21 members of the National Woman's Party gathered in front of the State House with suffrage banners. They were there to protest President Wilson's arrival in Boston. The women were arrested when they refused to comply with police orders to move. In newspaper accounts, Betty was singled out as resisting arrest and had to be "lifted bodily" into the police wagon.

== Ratification efforts ==
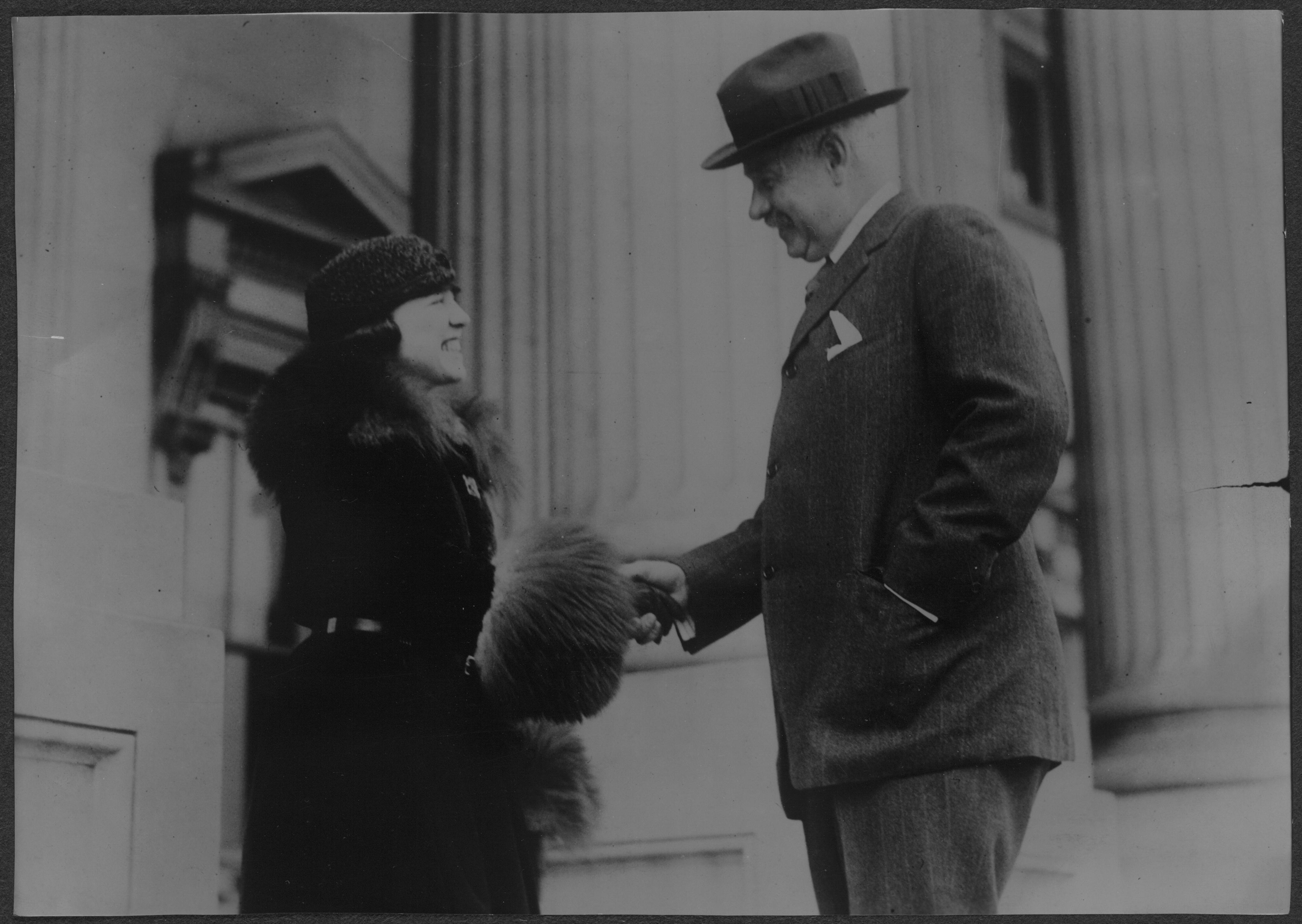
Senator Freylinghuysen of New Jersey congratulates Betty Gram on the ratification of the 19th Amendment by the NJ legislature in Feb of 1920.

After multiple attempts through 1918 and the beginning of 1919, on June 4, 1919, Congress finally passed the Nineteenth Amendment to the United States Constitution granting women the right to vote, pending ratification by the states. Betty Gram and the National Woman's Party quickly shifted their efforts from the White House to the states. Betty became a leader in the ratification campaign, working in New Jersey, Massachusetts, Delaware, West Virginia, Tennessee, and other states. In January 1920, suffragists defeated a New Jersey referendum movement that would have put the question of ratification directly to voters. Delaware became an important battleground state, with an active anti-suffrage movement. According to the Boston Herald, the NWP sent its "most experienced ratification campaigners" there, including Betty Gram. In June 1920, suffragists picketed the Republican National Convention in Chicago, hoping to pressure the Republican legislature of Delaware and Republican governors of Connecticut and Vermont for their failure to ratify the amendment. The Cleveland Plain Dealer, covering the convention, described Betty Gram as "young, vivacious, and pretty" and referenced the miniature steel jail door she wore as a breast pin, symbolizing her time in jail for the cause of women's suffrage. The NWP did not picket the Democratic National Convention in San Francisco.

In July 1920, Betty Gram was on her way to Tennessee to capture the 36th, and last, state needed for ratification. Her hometown paper, the Oregonian, interviewed her on her work to get women the right to vote. Betty said, "I joined the picket group because I realized suffrage was at a standstill and unless something dramatic was done, nothing could be accomplished.". On August 18, 1920, Tennessee became the 36th state to ratify the 19th Amendment to the US Constitution. The long battle was won.

== Post-suffrage ==
Having finally succeeded in their years-long effort, the National Woman's Party and other women's groups had to reconsider the makeup and mission of their organizations. In addition, the NWP lost some members as women focused on their careers or other causes. Still others "found that marriage and family responsibilities at least temporarily curtailed their NWP activities." Shortly after the ratification of the 19th amendment, Betty Gram set off for Europe to resume her music studies. After marrying Raymond Swing in 1921, her husband's career as a radio commentator and foreign correspondent took them to England, where they lived for over a decade. Now Betty Gram Swing, Betty continued her work for women's rights in the UK and in the international arena.

=== A rift ===
Even with the right to vote, there were many other barriers to the full participation of women in business and society. The NWP, the League of Women Voters, the Business and Professional Women, the Women's Trade Union League and other groups all worked to improve women's lives, but they had very different philosophies and approaches. The NWP faction are referred to as "equalitarian feminists", because they adopted a platform of equal rights for women, as opposed to the "social feminists" who supported a broader set of humanitarian social reforms, including child labor laws and protectionist legislation such as limiting a woman's work week, prohibiting night work for women, and a minimum wage for women and children. There were other legal issues facing women as well, such as the right to serve on a jury, equal rights of inheritance and property ownership, and questions of a married woman's citizenship independent of her husband's. However, like the fight for suffrage, much disagreement remained among the various feminist groups as to the best way to achieve economic opportunity or economic independence for women. An essential element of this rift concerned employment rights for married women, specifically labor laws protecting women versus NWP's “equality” argument. The NWP was against protectionist legislation, arguing it hurt women in the workplace by causing employers not to hire them. As historian Susan Becker describes the feminist movement in the 1920s and 1930s the NWP "stood alone throughout these two decades in its single-minded dedication to obtaining legal equality between men and women."

== Equal rights ==
In 1926, Betty Gram Swing, along with two other American members of the NWP, formed an English outpost of the group in order to aid British feminists in their efforts to repeal the laws limiting women's voting rights to women over the age of 30. Having also fought (and picketed) for equal pay for women and married women's employment rights during her years in England, Betty Gram Swing returned to the United States in 1934. In the fall of that year, she gave a speech to the Inter-American Commission of Woman at the Pan-American Union warning that women would lose their hard-earned rights unless they were ready to fight for them. A Washington Post article covering the speech described Betty as one of "the youngest and most beautiful leaders in international feminism." The article notes that Betty was focused at that time on having the Equal Rights Treaty "ratified and adhered to by all nations."

=== Amendment and treaty ===
In the post-suffrage time period, American women's groups divided their attention between new legislative agendas, the Equal Rights Amendment (either supporting or opposing it) and the growing focus on international women's issues, highlighted by the NWP's efforts to lobby for approval of the Equal Rights Treaty, which was modeled on the Equal Rights Amendment but was intended as an international document to be ratified by nations. In the 1930s both equalitarian and social feminist agendas were hampered by the Great Depression and the rise of fascism.

The NWP drafted the first version of the Equal Rights Amendment in 1921 and it provoked disputes almost immediately, even before it was introduced in Congress in 1923. It was addressed in Congressional subcommittees throughout the 1920s and 1930s but was not reported out until 1936. Hearings and committee reports followed into the 1940s, with the League of Women Voters and other social feminist groups consistently opposing it. At the same time, the NWP was working internationally on the Treaty, which was presented to the Sixth Pan American conference in 1928 and, unofficially, at international talks in Paris. (With shades of their picketing days, Betty Gram Swing, NWP veteran Doris Stevens, and a few others attempted to present the Equal Rights Treaty to President Gaston Doumergue of France, while he was hosting negotiations of the Kellogg-Briand Pact. They were refused entry and when they refused to leave the gates, they were held in custody for a few hours.)

Even though the United States was not a member of the League of Nations, the NWP focused its Treaty efforts there, using its relationships with Latin American women's groups for support. Again, social feminists opposed the Treaty because they believed it would undermine international protectionist labor laws benefitting women. Ultimately, the League of Nations reported the Treaty back to national governments, women's groups, and the International Labor Office, which was a social feminist organization. With the NWP excluded from the decision-making, in 1938 Alice Paul formed the World Women's Party with European equalitarian feminists but the organization was unable to make great strides in the near-term because of the outbreak of World War II.

=== Post-war period and international women's rights ===
The post-war battles between women's groups resolved themselves along the same lines as the pre-war battles, with the NWP and equalitarians on one side and social feminists on the other. This time, they would battle over the establishment of the UN Commission on the Status of Women. NWP's position as a strong backer of a UN Commission placed it at odds with other groups, including the League of Women Voters.

In 1946, Betty was in London as a National Woman's Party representative to the World Women's Party along with British feminist Emmeline Pethick-Lawrence. The NWP supported international efforts like creating a UN commission on women partly in the hope that it would secure the ERA at home. Others opposed those efforts for the same reason. Eleanor Roosevelt, who was anti-ERA and viewed as an opponent of the NWP, was a representative to the UN Conference. These disputes left American women on the sidelines to some extent and the effort to create a UN commission for women was led by New Zealand. On February 16, 1946 the sub-Commission on the Status of Women was formed as part of the Human Rights Commission, and granted full status after its first meeting. Betty's work at the UN was cited in a December 1946 newspaper article on the World Women's Party and the UN General Assembly's resolution calling for equality of political rights for all women. A small collection of Betty Gram Swing's papers are housed at the Arthur and Elizabeth Schlesinger Library on the History of Women in America.
