= Title 28 of the Code of Federal Regulations =

U.S. federal rules and regulations on judicial administration

CFR Title 28 - Judicial Administration is one of fifty titles comprising the United States Code of Federal Regulations (CFR), containing the principal set of rules and regulations issued by federal agencies regarding judicial administration. It is available in digital and printed form, and can be referenced online using the Electronic Code of Federal Regulations (e-CFR).

== Structure ==
The table of contents, as reflected in the e-CFR updated March 4, 2014, is as follows:

Volume	Chapter	Parts	Regulatory Entity
1	I	0-42	Department of Justice
2		43-199	Department of Justice
	III	300-399	Federal Prison Industries, Inc., Department of Justice
	V	500-599	Bureau of Prisons, Department of Justice
	VI	600-699	Offices of Independent Counsel, Department of Justice
	VII	700-799	Office of Independent Counsel
	VIII	800-899	Court Services and Offender Supervision Agency for the District of Columbia
	IX	900-999	National Crime Prevention and Privacy Compact Council
	XI	1100	Department of Justice and Department of State
