= Supreme Court Debates =

- Categories: Judiciary, Government
- Frequency: 9 per year
- Founded: 1997
- Company: Congressional Digest Corp.
- Country: United States
- Based in: Washington, DC
- Website: Congressional Digest - Supreme Court Debates
- ISSN: 1099-5390

Supreme Court Debates, published by Congressional Digest Corp., is a 36-page monthly publication spotlighting current cases before the U.S. Supreme Court. The publication follows, analyzes, and reports on activities in the highest U.S. court, using a pro and con format that gives equal weight to both sides of the issues covered.

Supreme Court Debates, started in 1997, and International Debates, started in 2003, complement the company's flagship publication, Congressional Digest.

Supreme Court Debates’ readership includes students, legal scholars, lawyers, educators, libraries, and policymakers.
