= One World or None =

1946 film

- Title card
- Based on: One World or None (book)
- Narrated by: Raymond Swing
- Music by: Louis Applebaum
- Production company: Philip Ragan Productions
- Distributed by: Film Publishers
- Release date: 1946
- Running time: Nine minutes, 18 seconds
- Country: United States
- Language: English

One World or None (1946) is an instructional documentary short film produced by the National Committee on Atomic Information in conjunction with Philip Ragan Productions. Made just months after the Atomic bombings of Hiroshima and Nagasaki, it is considered the first postwar "atomic scare" film. (Note: Later films such as Duck and Cover (1952) also exploited the "Red Scare" of the 1950s.)

== Synopsis ==
One World or None established that throughout history, scientists from many nations have made great advances and discoveries and have shared that knowledge globally. The periodic table was developed by Russian chemist Dmitri Mendeleev, British scientist J. J. Thomson and his team discovered the principle of the electron, and German theorist Albert Einstein came up with the theory of relativity. Nuclear physics was a product of New Zealand physicist Ernest Rutherford's work on the atomic nucleus, Danish physicist Niels Bohr's identification of atomic structure and American physicist Carl David Anderson's discovery of the positron.

Other advances included English physicist James Chadwick discovering the neutron, while French scientists Irène Joliot-Curie and her husband Frédéric Joliot-Curie studied artificial radioactivity. Further nuclear research was carried out by Enrico Fermi, who transmuted uranium based on Japanese physicist Hantaro Nagaoka's theories on the atom. German scientist Otto Hahn derived barium from uranium, while uranium was split by Austrian-Swedish physicist Lise Meitner.

Knowledge about atomic energy was shared by all. The question remains, will the people of the earth use this powerful energy to benefit humanity? The first outward manifestation is the atom bomb that was dropped on Hiroshima. Images of the city after the attack are startling.

Imagining the destruction inflicted in seconds on an American city. A metropolis such as New York City, Chicago or San Francisco would have its downtown core devastated by blast effects and radioactivity.

According to information provided by the Federation of American Scientists, the massive destructive power of the atom bomb is contrasted with earlier weapons of war. A Roman soldier's lance would only kill one enemy, Napoleon's cannon perhaps a dozen, the "Big Bertha" cannon could kill up to 88, and the V-2 killed as many of 168 individuals on average, but the first atom bomb killed more than 100,000 at Hiroshima.

The atom bomb was delivered by aircraft which had a limited range, but new bombers have an intercontinental range. Imagine the frightening prospect if Japan and Germany had had the atom bomb during the war. Attacks by the Axis powers could have brought World War II to an end, as there would have been no defense against a V-2 rocket carrying an atom bomb. Even with the short range of the rocket, all of England could have been attacked from bases in France. While only in the blueprint stage, advanced rockets capable of crossing the Atlantic could have destroyed the U.S. Eastern seaboard cities. U-boats armed with atom bombs delivered by rockets could have threatened more of North America. Fifth column sabotage using atom bombs could devastate any U.S. center.

The answer to atomic warfare is to have the nations of the world unite under the United Nations framework, abolish war and put Nuclear weapons and other weapons of mass destruction under international control, as well as establish criminal responsibility for aggression (anticipating the International Criminal Court). Representatives of the peoples of the world are confronted with a choice: unite as one world or face destruction.

== History ==
=== Federation of Atomic Scientists ===
The Federation of Atomic Scientists (FAS) was founded in November 1945 by Manhattan Project scientists who helped construct the first atom bombs. Their credo was that all scientists, engineers, and other "technically-trained thinkers" have an ethical obligation to ensure the technological "fruits of their intellect and labor" are applied to the benefit of humanity.

=== One World or None (book) ===
In early 1946, rebranded as the Federation of American Scientists (FAS), the organization took efforts to broaden and diversify its network of supporters to include all who want to reduce nuclear dangers and ultimately prevent global catastrophe. In 1946, just months after atom bombs were dropped on Hiroshima and Nagasaki, the scientists who had developed nuclear technology came together to express their concerns and thoughts about the nuclear age they had unleashed through the release of a book, One World or None. The anthology of essays included contributions from Niels Bohr, Albert Einstein, and Robert Oppenheimer, among others.

The book stresses the triumph of offence over defense. Chapter 7 by radar expert Louis N. Ridenour is titled “There is no defense.” He says: “Modern weapons, in particular atomic bomb, have led to a considerable advantage in the means of offense… over those of defense.” It was before the introduction of ICBM, SLBM and MIRV which further magnified offence over defense. Though remaining on the level of operational strategy, the official declaratory policy invested much efforts to cover this reality from the public by means of MAD and Deterrence theories.

One World or None was critically reviewed in the New York Herald Tribune Book Review, March 17, 1946: "An illuminating, powerful, threatening and hopeful statement which will clarify a lot of confused thinking about atomic energy.” The original edition sold 100,000 copies. Quickly rising to the top of The New York Times bestsellers' list, the book spawned the short film of the same name.

== Production ==
Ashley Montagu suggested making the film during a meeting of the Federation of American Scientists in 1945, and the idea was well-received. After writing the script and undergoing several revisions, the team sought the approval and advice of Albert Einstein.

When Montagu visited Einstein in June 1946, Einstein reviewed the script and responded positively, calling the title One World or None an excellent choice and declaring the script "just right" without suggesting any changes.

Einstein strongly supported the idea of using the film as a means of educating the public about the control of atomic energy. He saw the film as a step toward raising awareness of the need for international control over nuclear energy and believed that it required additional support and an extended educational campaign. The film was released in October 1946.

Technical assistance on One World or None was provided by the Federation of Atomic Scientists. Philip Ragan Productions was responsible for One World or None, using a mix of animation and live-action stock footage, including scenes from Hiroshima and the Nuremberg War Trials. Philip Ragan was a filmmaker from Philadelphia who specialized in cartoon animation. In 1941, Ragan was contracted by John Grierson at the National Film Board of Canada (NFB) to complete a series of animated films for the National War Finance Committee promoting Victory War Bonds. Between 1941 and 1945, Ragan produced 27 animated films for the NFB, many of them educational films.

Another connection to the NFB was composer Louis Applebaum, who composed approximately 250 film scores for the NFB between 1942 and 1960. He is also known for his work in Hollywood on Story of G.I. Joe (1945), Dreams That Money Can Buy (1947) and Lost Boundaries (1949).

The film was narrated by Raymond Gram Swing, a well-known radio journalist.

== Reception ==
One World or None was produced for a theatrical market. The film is widely considered the first postwar "atomic scare" film. It later went into the public domain and is now preserved at the Prelinger Archives.

== See also ==
- Duck and cover, for further discussion of this method of self-defense
- List of films about nuclear issues
- List of films in the public domain in the United States
- Civil Defence Information Bulletin, a 1964 British film which deals with the same topic
- Protect and Survive, a 1970-80s British information film on the same topic
