= International Debates =

- Categories: Politics, Government
- Frequency: 9 per year
- Founded: 2003
- Company: Congressional Digest Corp.
- Country: United States
- Website: Congressional Digest - International Debates
- ISSN: 1542-0345

International Debates, published by Congressional Digest Corp., is a 36-page, monthly publication featuring controversies before the United Nations and other international forums. The publication uses a pro and con format that gives equal weight to both sides of the issues covered.

International Debates, started in 2003, and Supreme Court Debates, started in 1997, complement the company's flagship publication Congressional Digest.

International Debates' subscribers includes high school and university libraries, debate organizations, and other groups and individuals interested in current events.
