= National Capital Revitalization and Self-Government Improvement Act of 1997 =

US federal law

The National Capital Revitalization and Self-Government Improvement Act of 1997, also known as the Revitalization Act, was enacted on August 5, 1997, with provisions to reform the criminal justice system in Washington, D.C. The act was spearheaded by North Carolina Republican senator Lauch Faircloth.

== Corrections ==
Under the legislation, adult felon prisoners were put under custody of the Bureau of Prisons, and the Lorton Reformatory in Lorton, Virginia, was required to close by December 31, 2001. Offenders serving short sentences for misdemeanors serve time at either the Central Detention Facility or the Correctional Treatment Facility, both run by the District of Columbia Department of Corrections. Approximately 6,500 prisoners have been sent to Bureau of Prison facilities around the United States, including over a 1,000 sent to West Virginia, and another 1,000 to the new and purpose-built Rivers Correctional Institution in North Carolina. Following the passage of the Revitalization Act, a Corrections Trustee was appointed by U.S. attorney general Janet Reno to oversee the District of Columbia Department of Corrections during the transition period.

== Parole and probation ==
The Revitalization Act transferred authority regarding parole to the United States Parole Commission, and the Court Services and Offender Supervision Agency was established to oversee probationers and parolees, and provide pretrial services. The functions were previously handled by the D.C. Superior Court and the D.C. Pretrial Services Agency.

== Funding ==
The Revitalization Act also mandated that the federal government provide funding for the District of Columbia court system, including the Superior Court of the District of Columbia, and the District of Columbia Court of Appeals.
