= Congressional Digest =

- Categories: Politics, Government
- Frequency: 10 per year
- Founder: Alice Gram Robinson
- Founded: 1921
- Company: Congressional Digest Corp.
- Country: United States
- Website: congressionaldigest.com
- ISSN: 0010-5899

The Congressional Digest, published by Congressional Digest Corporation, is a scholarly independent monthly publication with offices in Washington, DC. Congressional Digest was founded in 1921 by suffragette Alice Gram Robinson with the goal of presenting, in her words, “an impartial view of controversial issues.” Each issue focuses on one specific topic before Congress and includes primary source research material without editorial bias in a PRO & CON format.

A major source of inspiration for the publication’s format was the 1920 ratification of the Nineteenth Amendment to the United States Constitution, granting women the right to vote. Robinson believed that the best way to prevent newly franchised voters from being unduly swayed or intimidated by the actions or rhetoric of Congress was to provide them with side-by-side arguments on pending legislation. Since 1921, Congressional Digest has been an independent publication featuring controversies facing Congress and the Supreme Court. Not an official organ, nor is it controlled by any party, interest, class or sect.

Congressional Digest has continued for three generations and is now led by Robinson’s granddaughter, Page Robinson. The publication has stayed true to its original concept, presenting excerpted verbatim statements from current congressional debates in a pro-and-con format, along with digested government material to put the controversy in historical and legislative context.

Congressional Digest Corporation publishes two additional publications: Supreme Court Debates, started in 1997, and International Debates, published from 2003–2013. All three are available online; Congressional Digest is also available in print.

The publications’ subscribers include high school and university libraries, debate organizations, and other groups and individuals interested in current events.
