= Raymond Gram Swing =

American journalist

Raymond Gram Swing (March 25, 1887 – December 22, 1968) was an American print and broadcast journalist. He was one of the most influential news commentators of his era, heard by people worldwide as a leading American voice from Britain during World War II. Known originally as Raymond Swing, he adopted his wife's last name in 1919 and became known as Raymond Gram Swing.

== College years ==
Swing was born in Cortland, New York, on March 25, 1887. He attended Oberlin College in Ohio, where his father was a professor of theology. As a youth, Swing was the proverbial "minister's son" and felt unable to live up to his parents' high expectations. Describing himself during his student days as "a prankster who found freshman math 'totally incomprehensible,'" Swing only lasted for a year at Oberlin. He later expressed gratitude for "how much Oberlin had given me—in music, in the first interest I had in the other arts, and in the basic liberalism of racial and sexual equality." "Just being a part of Oberlin gave me an innate sense of the political equality of men and women—all men and all women."

== Early career ==
After leaving Oberlin, Swing worked briefly in a barber shop. His first foray into journalism came at age 19, in 1906 with the Cleveland Press. This was followed by stints at The Richmond (Indiana) Evening News, the Indianapolis Star and The Cincinnati Times-Star. Determined to prove himself after what he saw as his early failure, he worked to the point of exhaustion. His career was meteoric. At age 23 he became managing editor of the Indianapolis Sun. Then he was named London bureau chief for the Philadelphia Public Ledger. He also wrote for the journal The Nation during this time.

By 1913, Swing was working as Berlin and Germany bureau chief for the Chicago Daily News. When World War I broke out in 1914, he covered major battles and was the first to report on the existence of Big Bertha, a massive 420 mm artillery cannon. Gordon Holmes claimed in her autobiography that Swing once told her that he may have been "the only man who might have stopped the 1914 war and forgot to." She recalled:

[Swing] tells how in December, 1914, the German authorities entrusted him with a peace offer to carry to Sir Edward Grey. Germany wanted peace, would withdraw from Belgium and France, would ask for a financial indemnity as a German face-saver, but would not expect payment. Swing, very young, very nervous, saw Grey, who received the message in silence until the word “indemnity” was reached. Then "Grey flushed and denounced it as an insult” and flatly turned down the German proposal. And only after the meeting was over did Swing realize he had told Grey that an indemnity would be asked for, but had forgotten to tell him that payment would not be expected.

In 1915 the Chicago Daily News sent him to Turkey, where his coverage of the attack on the Dardanelles and other stories made him legendary. Crossing the Sea of Marmora on a Turkish freighter, the Nagara, as the British submarine HMS E11 overtook the ship, one of the officers signaled for Swing to do the talking. The British sub commander asked "Who are you?" A question to which Swing should have replied with the ship's name but he instead responded, "I am Raymond Swing, of the Chicago Daily News."

== Career after World War I ==
In 1922, Swing left the New York Herald, for which he had been "the eminent Berlin correspondent," to join The Wall Street Journal as head of its staff in Europe. By 1930, he headed the New York Evening Post's London Bureau.

During the 1920s, Swing migrated to the new medium of radio journalism, to which his reassuring and articulate manner was uniquely suited. After covering the 1932 presidential election, he was offered a job at CBS. Swing turned the job down and it was later given to Edward R. Murrow. Swing instead joined the Mutual Broadcasting System, where, in 1936, he began to broadcast on European affairs, emerging as a strong voice of opposition to Adolf Hitler and Fascism. As the Nazis rose in power and influence and began to threaten Europe, Mutual increased his broadcasts to five times a week. He also gave a number of lectures in the United States and abroad on the dangers of Fascism. In The Historian, David H. Culbert described Swing as a liberal who voted for Norman Thomas in 1926 and supported Franklin D. Roosevelt during World War II.

Because of his prestige and credibility, Swing was chosen to be chairman of the Council for Democracy, a group founded in 1940 to support American rearmament and combat domestic isolationism. Funded by Henry Luce, the council was led by Harvard political science professor Carl Joachim Friedrich and Charles Douglas Jackson, vice president of Time magazine. Swing was the narrator for the cartoon series How War Came, nominated in 1941 for an Academy Award in the Best Short Subject, Cartoons category.

During the war, Swing was reportedly the nation's highest-paid radio commentator. After the war he worked at ABC, BBC and the Blue Network. In 1946, he narrated One World or None, a short film produced by the Federation of American Scientists which advocated that the people of the world must abolish war under a strengthened United Nations or face death through nuclear war.

In the spring of 1951, after Swing had been offered a position with the Voice of America (VOA), the entertainment industry periodical Counterattack called him a Communist sympathizer. He then received his security clearance and joined the VOA as a political commentator in May. In 1953, he was called to testify before Senator Joseph McCarthy's Investigations Subcommittee, but was questioned for only a few minutes in private. Because he objected to McCarthy's treatment of the VOA and to the State Department's failure to defend the service and its employees, he resigned, sending a copy of his resignation letter to the press. It said he was resigning to protest the State Department's "spineless failure...to stand by its own staff," citing the recent resignation of Theodore Kaghan in particular. He said the VOA "has been crippled, perhaps beyond recovery, by slanderous attacks on its integrity."

During the early 1950s, Edward R. Murrow hired Swing to write news copy for him.

Swing returned to his former position as a political commentator for the VOA from 1959 to 1964.

== Personal life and recognition ==
Following his marriage to Suzanne Morin with whom he had a son born in Europe and a daughter, Swing married his second wife, Betty Gram Swing (c. 1894 – 1969), a feminist and suffragist, whom he met in Berlin in 1919. Because Swing shared her views on gender equality, he adopted her surname and became known as Raymond Gram Swing. The couple had two sons and a daughter. They divorced in 1944 and he dropped the "Gram" from his name. He then married Mary Hartshorne. They lived in Washington, D.C., and spent time at her home in Jamaica where he composed music. He later married Meisung Loh, who survived him.

Oberlin awarded him an honorary degree in 1940.

In 1943 Lewis received the Alfred I. duPont Award.

In 1962, Folkways Records released Raymond Swing: Seventy-Fifth Anniversary Album, which included highlights from Swing's career.

Swing died at home in Washington D.C., on December 22, 1968. Fred W. Friendly of CBS said: "He was the closest thing broadcasting ever had to a Walter Lippmann."

== Sources ==
- "Radio Find", an admiring profile of Raymond Swing in Time, Jan. 8, 1940
- Historian John Simkin
- Oberlin Alumni Magazine Spring 2000
- Raymond Gram Swing at IMDb
- Culbert, David Holbrook. News for everyman: radio and foreign affairs in thirties America, Greenwood Press, 1976.
- Good Evening! - A Professional Memoir - Raymond Swing Harcourt, Brace & World, Inc. 1964
