= Court Services and Offender Supervision Agency =

The Court Services and Offender Supervision Agency (CSOSA) was established under the National Capital Revitalization and Self-Government Improvement Act of 1997 to oversee probationers and parolees, and provide pretrial services in Washington, D.C. The functions were previously handled by the Superior Court of the District of Columbia and the D.C. Pretrial Services Agency. For the first three years, CSOSA operated under trustee John "Jay" Carver, and officially became a Federal agency in August 2000.

The CSOSA conducts drug testing and operates a substance abuse treatment program, as part of its community supervision program.

== See also ==
- Title 28 of the Code of Federal Regulations
