= Elizabeth King (journalist) =

American journalist (1885–1970)

Elizabeth King Phelps Stokes (November 19, 1885 – October 26, 1970), also known as Elizabeth King, was an American political journalist who wrote for the New York Evening Post. One of the first women to work in the press gallery of the Albany Legislature, she co-founded the Women's National Press Club.

== Career ==
King joined the New York Evening Post before World War I. In 1917, she was one of the first female journalists admitted to the press gallery for the New York state Legislature. By 1919, she was a Washington correspondent for the paper, and one of only 10 women accredited by the Congressional Directory to report from the press gallery of the U.S. Congress. Prior to World War I, women were not allowed into the Congressional press gallery and only one woman is recorded as being accredited in 1912. She was one of six founding members of the Women's National Press Club in 1919, because the National Press Club refused to admit women. In 1985, the National Press Club and Women's National Press Club officially merged.

After King's marriage in 1920, she continued to contribute to newspapers and journals as a freelance writer, including the Saturday Review and Harper's Magazine.

== Personal life ==
She married Harold Phelps Stokes, son of Anson Phelps Stokes and a fellow journalist. They had three daughters, including Lydia King Phelps Stokes, who was married to U.S. Attorney General Nicholas Katzenbach.
