= District of Columbia Department of Corrections =

- DC DOC logo

Agency overview
- Formed: 1946; 80 years ago
- Jurisdiction: District of Columbia
- Headquarters: 3924 Minnesota Ave NE, Washington, DC
- Employees: 1,231
- Annual budget: $241,239,428 (FY 2025)
- Agency executive: Quincy Booth, Interim Director
- Website: doc.dc.gov

The District of Columbia Department of Corrections (DCDC) is a law enforcement agency responsible for the adult jails and other adult correctional institutions and law enforcement buildings for the District of Columbia. DCDC runs the D.C. Jail.

== History ==
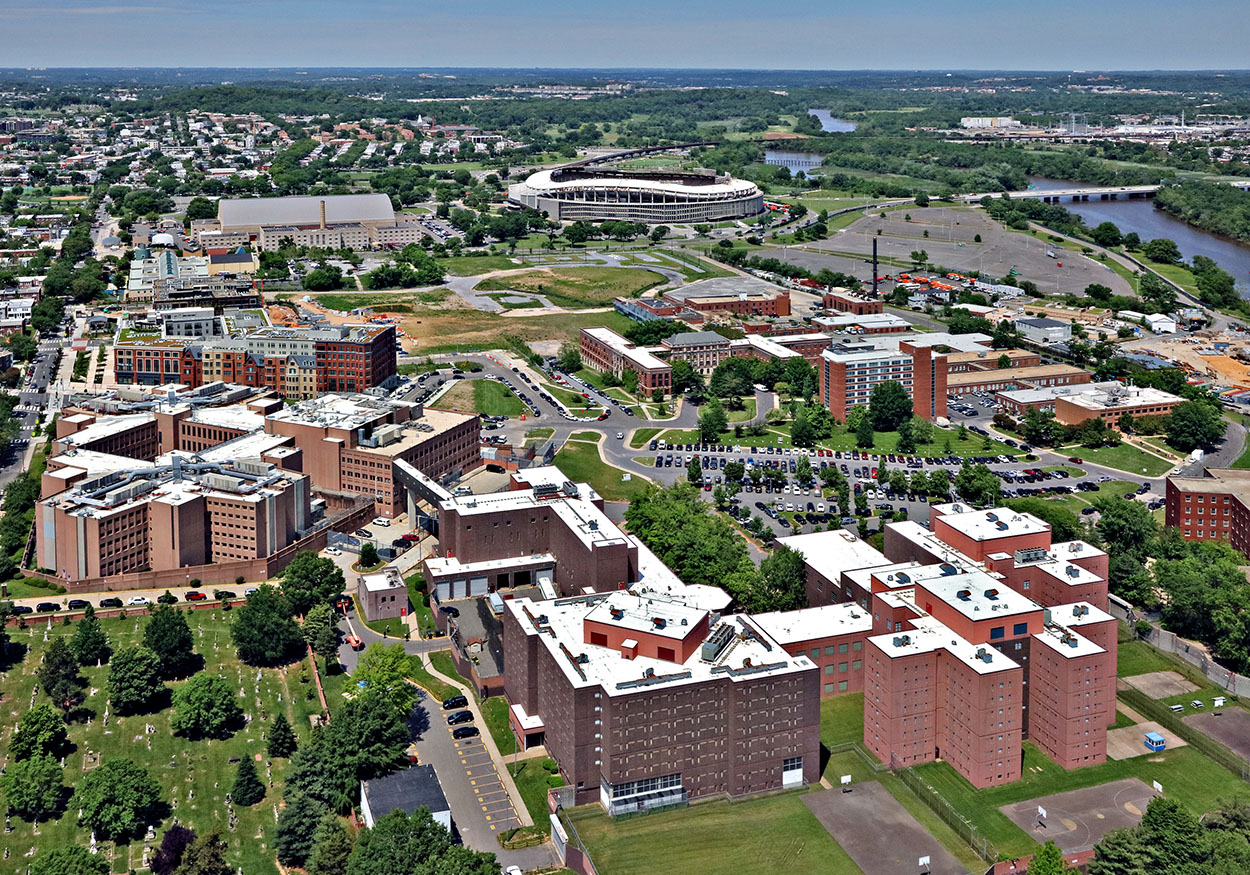
The D.C. Correctional Treatment Facility (foreground) and Central Detention Facility (middle background)

The DOC was first established as an agency in 1946, when the District Jail (built 1872) was combined with the Lorton Correctional Complex. The latter began as a workhouse for male prisoners in 1910, but later expanded to include eight prisons on 3,000 acres (12 km^{2}) of land in Lorton, Fairfax County, Virginia.

In 1999, the DCDC was paying the Virginia Department of Corrections to house 69 prisoners at the Red Onion State Prison.

== Operations ==
For about ninety years, the Lorton Correctional Complex in rural Fairfax County, Virginia, about 20 miles (32 km) south of Washington, served as the District of Columbia's prison for long-term incarceration. The National Capital Revitalization and Self-Government Improvement Act of 1997 required the DC Department of Corrections to transfer the sentenced felon population formerly housed at Lorton to the Federal Bureau of Prisons (BOP), and the Lorton facility shut down in 2001. The Lorton complex was handed over to the General Services Administration (GSA), which manages property for the federal government, which in turn gave the property to Fairfax County.

== Facilities ==
The DOC operates the Central Detention Facility (D.C. Jail) at 1901 D Street Southeast. The jail opened in 1976.

In 1985, a federal judge in the case of Campbell v. McGruder, a lawsuit filed against the District of Columbia for unconstitutional jail conditions, set a population cap of 1,674 inmates for the D.C. Jail. This judicially imposed cap was lifted in 2002, after seventeen years. In 2007, DOC administrators set the jail's population capacity at 2,164.

The D.C. Jail houses only adult males. It holds inmates detained while awaiting trial; inmates convicted of misdemeanors; and convicted felons awaiting transfer to the Federal Bureau of Prisons.

The Correctional Treatment Facility (CTF) at 1901 E Street SE, which the district opened in 1992, is an eight-story, medium-security facility located on 10.2 acres (4.1 ha) of land adjacent to the D.C. Jail. It consists of five separate buildings that appear like one large building. It is located adjacent to the D.C. Jail. It houses male prisoners, female prisoners, and juveniles charged as adults. (Juvenile males charged as adults formerly were housed at the D.C. Jail, but this practice was discontinued.) The CTF is operated by a private contractor, the Corrections Corporation of America, under a twenty-year contract with the District, entered into in March 1997.

The DOC contracts with three privately owned and operated halfway houses: Extended House, Inc., Fairview, and Hope Village. The U.S. District Court for the District of Columbia and the Superior Court of the District of Columbia sometimes use the halfway houses as an alternative to incarceration.

Juveniles who are not charged as adults are not in DOC custody; instead, they go to facilities operated by the Department of Youth Rehabilitation Services.

For fiscal year 2015, DOC reported having 939 full-time employees, which had increased to 1,231 for fiscal year 2025.

== Notable inmates ==
Central Detention Facility

- Rayful Edmond was charged with various drug crimes and with running a Continuing Criminal Enterprise involving at least 150 kilograms of cocaine and at least 1.5 kilograms of cocaine base.
- Barry Freundel, the "peeping rabbi," was convicted on 52 counts of voyeurism.
- Ingmar Guandique, suspect in the murder of Chandra Levy
- Andre Clinkscale and William McCorkle for the May 2008 murders of Duane Hough, Johnny Jeter, and Anthony Mincey,

== See also ==
- List of law enforcement agencies in the District of Columbia
