= List of California suffragists =

This is a list of notable California suffragists who were politically active before and during the successful Proposition 4 in 1911 which gave women won the right to vote.

== Groups ==
- California Equal Suffrage Association
- California Political Equality League
- California Woman Suffrage Society
- Congressional Union for Women Suffrage
- Fannie Jackson Coppin Club
- Los Angeles Forum of Colored Women.
- National American Woman Suffrage Association
- National Woman's Party
- Political Equality Club of Alameda
- Votes for Women Club
- Women's Christian Temperance Union
- Woman's Club of Palo Alto
- Young Women's Suffrage Club

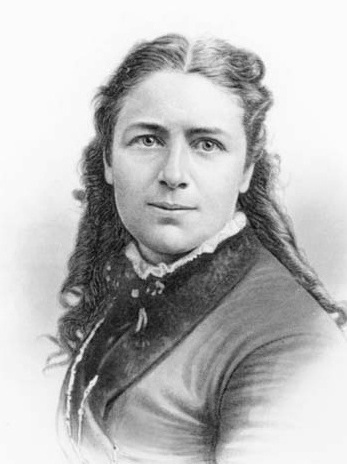
Laura de Force Gordon

== Early 19th century suffragists ==
- Anna Dickinson
- Laura de Force Gordon
- Georgiana Bruce Kirby
- Emily Pitts Stevens
- Ellen Clark Sargent
- Elizabeth Lowe Watson

== Suffragists in the 1896 campaign ==
- Naomi Anderson
- Alida Avery
- Addie Ballou
- James H. Barry
- Nellie Holbrook Blinn
- Ada Chastina Bowles
- Elinor Majors Carlisle
- Jeanne Carr
- Thomas V. Cator
- Ina Donna Coolbrith
- Sarah Brown Ingersoll Cooper
- Henry Clay Dibble
- Nellie Blessing Eyster
- Clara Shortridge Foltz
- Sarah Dix Hamlin
- Ida Harper
- Harriet Hobe
- Emma Shafter Howard
- Sarah Knox-Goodrich
- Eliza D. Keith
- Sara Lemmon
- Margaret V. Longley
- Agnes M. Manning
- Alice Moore McComas
- Frances W. McLean
- Kate Moody
- Mabel V. Osbourne
- Mary Goldsmith Prag
- Jennie Phelps Purvis
- Anna M. Morrison Reed.
- Ellen Clark Sargent
- Rebecca Spring
- Jane Lathrop Stanford
- Anna Strunsky
- Beaumelle Sturtevant-Peet
- Rowena Granice Steele.
- Mary Louise Swett
- Laura Lyon White
- Charlotte Anita Whitney
- Eliza Tucker Wilkes
- Elizabeth Yates

== Suffragists in the 1911 campaign ==
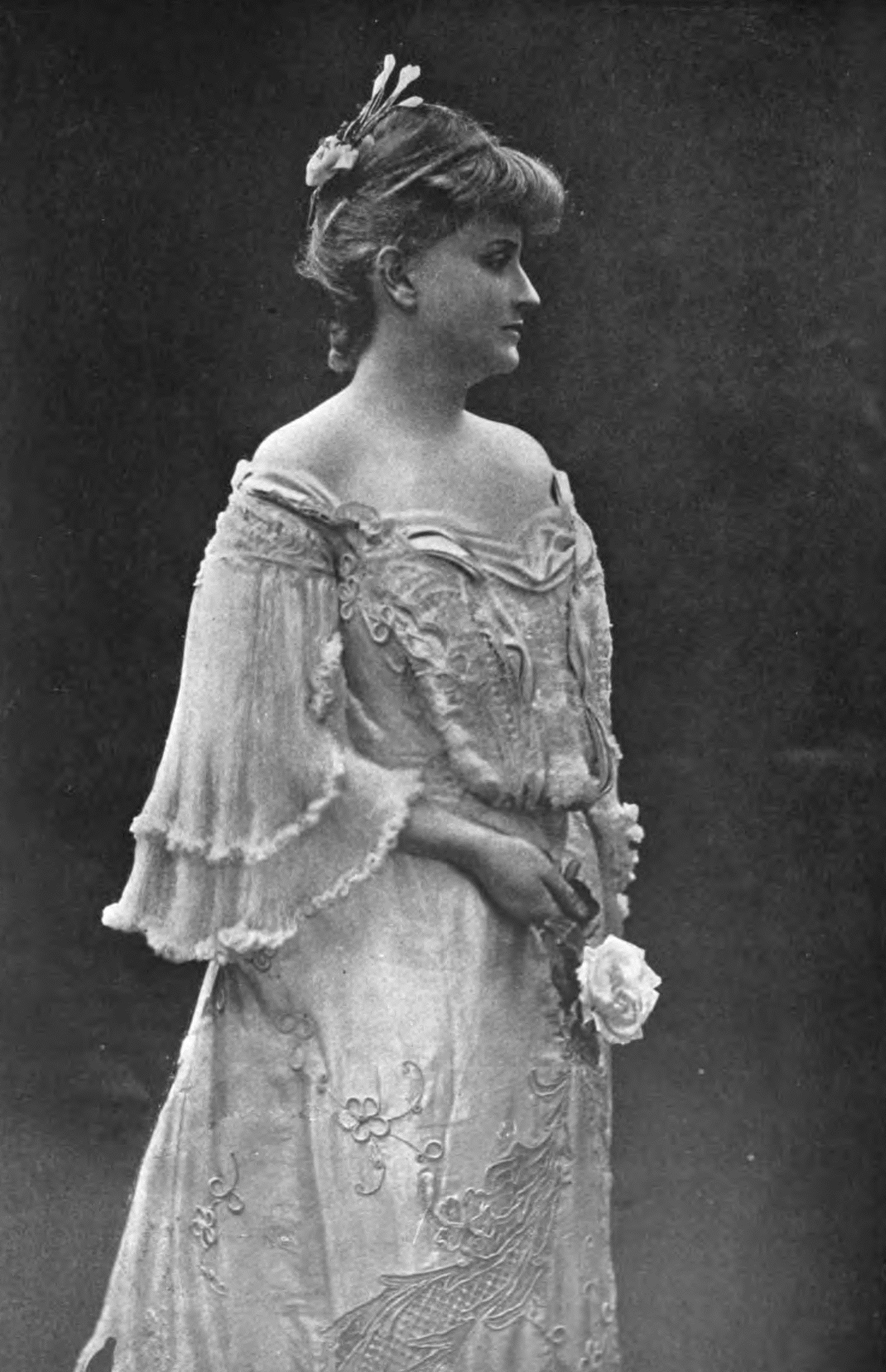
Gertrude Atherton

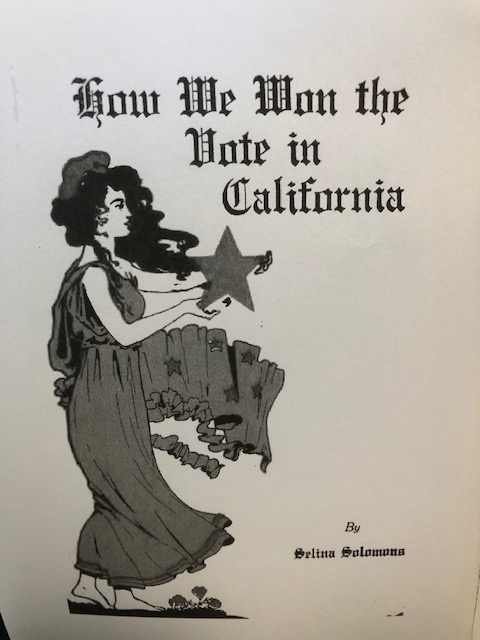
How We Won the Vote in California by Selina Solomons

- Minnie Sharkey Abrams
- Charles F. Aked
- Gertrude Atherton
- Mary Austin
- Charlotte Baker
- Bertha Hirsch Baruch – writer, president of the Los Angeles Suffrage Association.
- Helen Valeska Bary (1888–1973) – suffragist, researcher, and social reformer
- Bessie Beatty
- Elia Costillo Bennett
- Annie Ellicott Kennedy Bidwell
- Isabella Williams Blaney (1854–1933) – suffragist, politician.
- John Hyde Braly
- Eva Carter Buckner (Los Angeles).
- Mary Ryerson Butin (1857–1944) – physician; California suffragist.
- Lillian Harris Coffin
- Dora K. Crittenden
- Constance Dean
- Mabel Deering
- Maria de Lopez
- Katherine Philips Edson (1870–1933) – social worker and feminist, worked to add women's suffrage to the California State Constitution.
- Mary Fairbrother
- Katherine Felton
- Susan Fenton
- Londa Stebbins Fletcher
- Clara Shortridge Foltz
- Mary Emily Foy
- Rose M. French
- Mary T. Gamage
- Elizabeth Sears Gerberding
- Mary Simpson Gibson
- Charlotte Perkins Gilman
- Thomas Edward Hayden
- Dora Haynes
- John Randolph Haynes
- Phoebe Apperson Hearst
- Willa Henry
- Sarah Huston (1848-1926), newspaper editor and publisher
- Emma C. Laugenour (1842-1919), philanthropist and social reformer; pioneer suffragist and the foremost worker for its cause in Yolo County
- Gail Laughlin
- Mary McHenry Keith
- Elizabeth Kenney
- Elizabeth Thatcher Kent
- Louise La Rue
- Clara Chan Lee (1886–1993) – first Chinese American to register to vote in the US, 8 November 1911
- Austin Lewis
- Jack London
- Mary Theresa Longley
- Ethel Lynn
- Walter Macarthur
- Ida Finney Mackrille
- Lillian Jane Martin
- Martha Nelson McCan
- John Knox McLean
- Emma Sutro Merritt
- Miriam Michelson
- Susan Lincoln Tolman Mills
- Ethel Moore
- Helen Moore
- May Treat Morrison
- Charles Murdock
- Rabbi Jacob Nieto
- Frances Nacke Noel.
- Gwendolen Overton (1874/76-1958) - favored woman suffrage; wrote magazine and newspaper articles on the topic
- Sarah Massey Overton (1850–1914) – women's rights activist and black rights activist.
- George Pardee
- Alice Park
- Maud Wood Park
- Martha Pearce.
- Francesca Pierce.
- Laura Bride Powers.
- Louise Merrill Pratt.
- Agnes Ray.
- Edwin Alsworth Ross.
- Anna Elizabeth Rude.
- Helen P. Sanborn
- Ellen Clark Sargent
- Clara W. Schlingheyde
- Caroline Severance
- Minnie Sharkey
- Charles M. Shortridge
- Myra Virginia Simmons
- Selina Solomons
- Anna Kalfus Spero
- Mary Simpson Sperry
- Emelie Tracy Swett
- Mary Wood Swift
- Lucretia Watson Taylor
- Beatrice Sumner Thompson (California).
- Hettie Blonde Tilghman
- Frances Watson Toll
- Florence True
- Marion Foster Washburne (1863-1944) - lectured in California and Illinois.
- Elizabeth Lowe Watson (1842–1927) – president, California Equal Suffrage Association.
- Charlotte L. Willis
- Jackson Stitt Wilson
- Annie Wood
- Maud Younger

== Suffragists who campaigned in California ==
- Lucy Anthony
- Susan B. Anthony
- Carrie Chapman Catt
- Abigail Scott Duniway
- Lucretia Del Valle Grady
- Helen Hoy Greeley.
- Julia Ward Howe
- Florence Kelley
- Anne Henrietta Martin
- Anna Howard Shaw
- Sylvia Pankhurst
- Helen Todd
- Elizabeth Margaret Vater Longley

== See also ==
- Timeline of women's suffrage in California
- Women's suffrage in California
- Women's suffrage in states of the United States
- Women's suffrage in the United States
