= Women's suffrage in California =

19th century political struggle

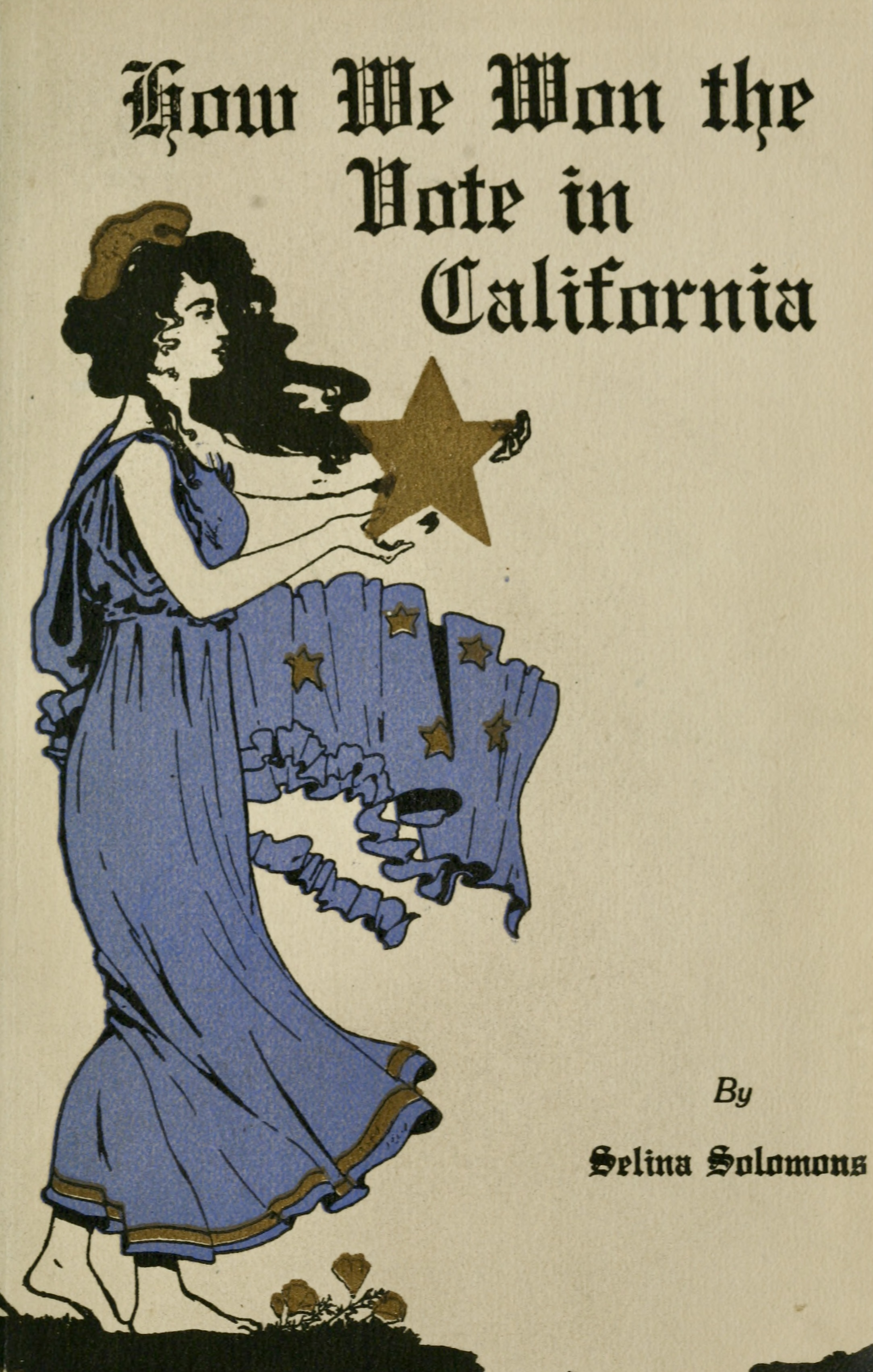
Title page of How We Won the Vote in California by Selina Solomons, published 1912

The women's suffrage movement began in California in the 19th century and was successful with the passage of Proposition 4 on October 10, 1911. Many of the women and men involved in this movement remained politically active in the national suffrage movement with organizations such as the National American Women's Suffrage Association and the National Woman's Party.

== Origins of the movement ==
Eminent Opinions on Woman Suffrage, San Francisco Call newspaper July 4, 1909

Historian Ronald Schaffer has noted the women's suffrage movement in California "is a story of slow building and initial defeat." Starting the 1860s, a small number of activists began mobilizing for women's suffrage in this western state. In 1868, orators Laura de Force Gordon and Anna Dickinson gave a series of lectures advocating for women's suffrage. Susan B. Anthony was so impressed with Gordon that she was quoted as saying, "“You can't imagine how it delights my soul to find such an earnest, noble young woman possessed of powers oratorical.” Gordon was a prolific west coast orator who gave over 100 speeches.

In 1869, Emily Pitt and Elizabeth T. Schenck organized the first Pacific coast suffrage meeting in San Francisco. Early on in the suffrage movement in California there was an extensive amount of connection between western suffragists and national suffrage organizers on the east coast. Elizabeth Cady Stanton was impressed with Elizabeth T. Schneck, calling her "a woman of remarkable cultivation and research." In 1870, Susan B. Anthony wrote to Elizabeth T. Schenck calling on her to gather support amongst suffragists in the pacific states to endorse a bill which would have enfranchised women in Washington, D.C. Anthony noted in her letter that Schenck's suffrage organization had made a financial commitment to the National Woman Suffrage Association. In 1871 Stanton and Anthony took their only trip to California and drew large crowds to their speaking engagements.

Also in 1870 Laura de Force Gordon founded the California Woman Suffrage Society. She also successfully worked with lawyer and suffragist Clara Shortridge Foltz to pass the 1878 Woman Lawyer's Bill which allowed women to practice law in the state of California. Foltz was a mother of five in addition to one of the first female lawyers on the west coast. It was also in 1878 that suffragists distributed petitions to remove the words "white male" from the California constitution although this effort was ultimately unsuccessful.

In 1890 Addie Ballou, a well known spiritualist and suffragist, served as chair for an annual woman suffrage convention. In 1894 the Republican Party in the state of California endorsed women's suffrage.

== Defeat of Amendment 6 in 1896 ==
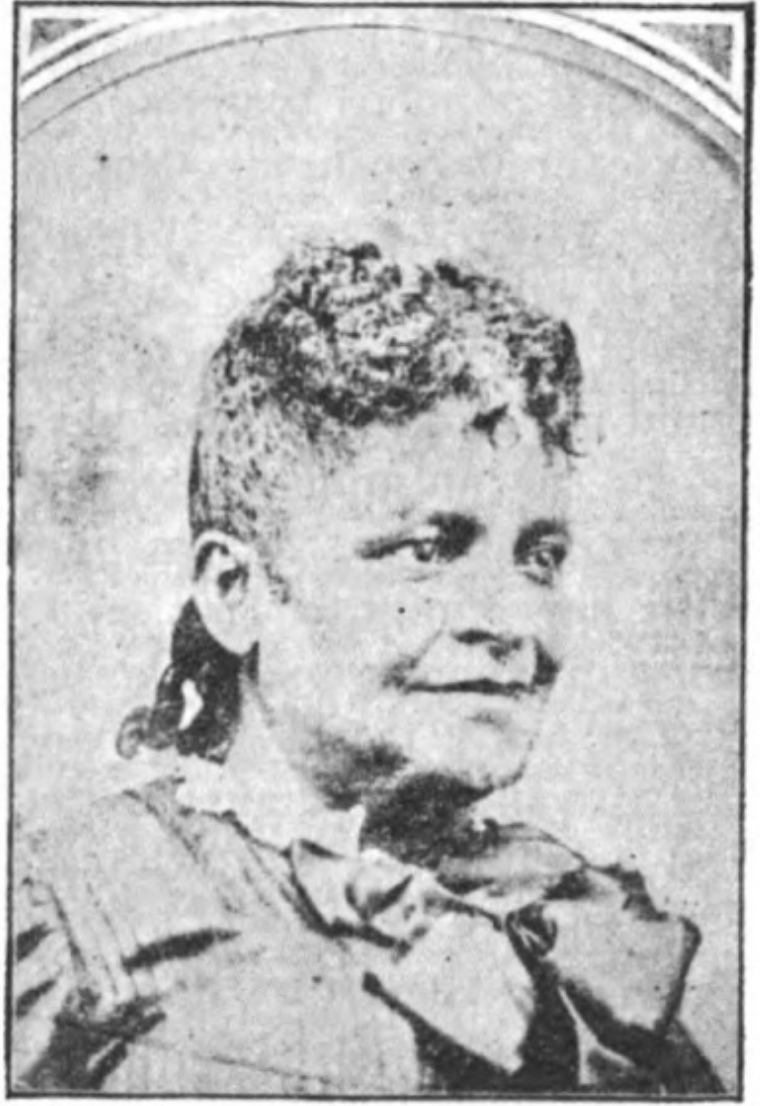
Orator and suffragist Naomi Anderson

Both California and Idaho held referendums on women's suffrage in 1896. African American suffragist Naomi Anderson traveled throughout the state to campaign for suffrage. Sarah Overton from San Jose also campaigned for the cause. Ida Harper published a letter in the Los Angeles Herald advocating for the passage of Amendment 6 where she noted the suffrage movement would welcome the support of both political parties. The endorsement of newspapers was very important, as they were the main source of the publicity for the Amendment. Part of the defeat was when two newspapers, the San Francisco Chronicle and the Los Angeles Times, did not endorse the movement. The Democratic Party was also one of the reasons the vote did not pass. Clara Shortridge Foltz, who was also a very important woman in this campaign, spoke to the Democrats to try and win their vote, but it ended up being a lost cause. Many Roman Catholics, the anti Catholic America Protective Association, people from the Bay Area, and men who did realize the full potential of the proposition, kept the amendment from passing. After an eight-month campaign a majority of male voters rejected this amendment. Despite two-thirds of both the California State Senate and California State Assembly voting to put the measure on the ballot, it failed 45-55 percentage-wise (110,355 Yes votes and 137,099 No votes.)Some suffragists believed the power of the liquor lobby was the reason for the defeat as it was assumed women voters would vote for temperance. Many male voters were worried women would vote to ban the sale of alcohol.

== Early 20th century suffrage activity ==
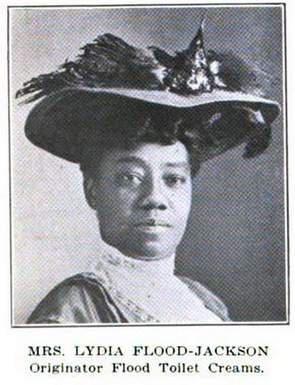
Suffragist Lydia Flood Jackson

California suffragists continued to persevere in the aftermath of the failure of the 1896 proposition. In the late 19th century and through the early 20th century suffragists in California published the Yellow Ribbon suffrage newsletter. Women such as Mary Simpson Sperry, Mary McHenry Keith and Ellen Clark Sargent traveled the state, organized suffrage meetings and published articles on the movement. Sargent had proposed a federal amendment for women's suffrage as far back as 1878. Strategically, these suffragists used the occasion of the nation's birthday to highlight the lack of elective franchise for women. By 1907 over five thousand women in California support suffrage. California suffragists also used the press to advance the cause. The July 4, 1909 edition of the San Francisco Call featured editorials by these suffragists. Mary Sperry, who was the president of the California Equal Suffrage Association, argued that politics has a direct impact on women's lives and they therefore deserve the vote. She wrote, "Women are not altogether ignorant of the defects of this government. Let us teach and tell what we know for the good of the community at large." Sargent argued women should take it upon themselves to learn as much as possible about government to prepare themselves to be educated voters. Sargent argued, "We must step out into the open and make ourselves so well acquainted with government in all its bearings that we will be considered authority upon the points we shall have investigated and thus command the respect of the most intelligent people, men and women."

== African American suffragists in Alameda County ==
Black women in California had been working for suffrage as far back as the 1890s. The Fannie Jackson Coppin Club was an important club for African American women in Alameda County who were active in the suffrage movement. Lydia Flood Jackson and Hettie B. Tilghman were among the leaders of this organization. Other active members included Melba Stafford and Willa Henry. Flood Jackson also served as a leader of the California Federation of Colored Women's Clubs. In the 1920s, Tilghman was heavily involved with the League of Women Voters. She also served as president of the Alameda County League of Colored Women Voters. Suffragist Georgianna Offutt served as vice president of this organization.

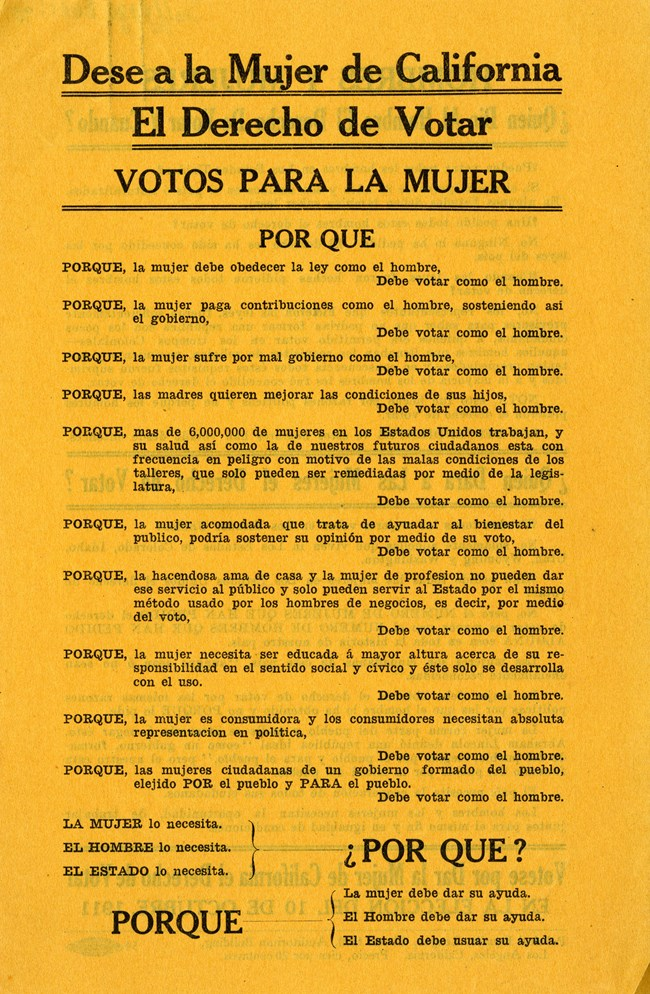
Pamphlet of the Los Angeles Political Equality League distributed by suffragist María de López

== Latina suffragists in California ==
One of the major organizers of the suffrage campaign in southern California was Maria de Lopez. Maria Guadalupe Evangelina Lopez, president of the College Equal Suffrage League, served as a Spanish translator for the movement. She also was the first woman to give a speech in Spanish in support of women's suffrage. During this time she was also involved in the Votes for Women club along with Clara Shortridge Folz.

== The 1911 campaign ==
The 1911 campaign involved a large number of suffragists throughout the state. For example, Minnie Sharkey Abrams helped organize suffragists in Butte County in northern California. Suffragists passed out over 3 million pages of literature as well as 90,000 votes for women buttons in the southern part of the state. In 1911 at the age of 62, Clara Shortridge Foltz drafted a suffrage amendment to the constitution which said, "Women citizens of this state who comply with elections laws and are twenty-one years old shall be entitled to vote at all elections." Suffrage was passed in California using very similar language as Folz's amendment and it passed by only 3,587 votes. In the South Bay, Sarah Massey Overton was politically active in the 1911 campaign. According to historian Delilah Beasley, she belonged to the Political Equality Club as well as the San Jose Suffrage Amendment League and recruited African American voters to the polls. On November 8, 1911, Clara Elizabeth Chan Lee became the first Chinese woman to register to vote in the United States.

== Men in the California suffrage campaign ==
In the 1911 campaign, California suffragists produced an important leaflet titled, "Extracts from the Speech of Father Gleason" which aimed to appeal to the Catholic voter.

== Art in the suffrage movement ==
California suffragists produced many short suffrage plays such as Mary Lambert's The Winning of Senator Jones and Selina Solomons's The Girl from Colorado. A suffrage play from England, "How the Vote Was Won" was presented to California suffragists from the College Equal Suffrage League while the suffrage amendment was being discussed by the California legislature.

== Women's suffrage in California after 1911 ==
Proposition 4 did not extend the right to vote to all women in California. Native Americans were barred from voting until the passage of the Indian Citizenship Act of 1924. Most Puerto Rican women could not vote (in practice) until 1935 when the literacy requirement was removed.

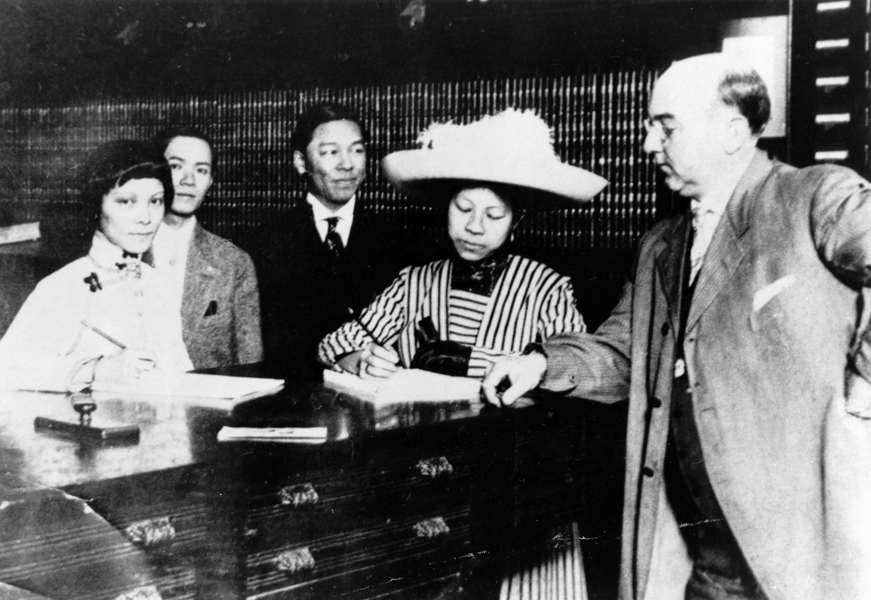
Clara Elizabeth Chan Lee, the first Chinese American woman to register to vote in the United States

After proposition 4 was passed in 1911, many California suffragists remained active in the fight for women's suffrage at the national level including Mary Austin and Maud Younger. In 1912 California suffragist Alice Park took over NAWSA's congressional committee charged with working towards the passage of a federal amendment granting women suffrage. Several joined the Congressional Union for Woman Suffrage including Lillian Harris Coffin and actress Mabel Taliaferro who also went by the name Mrs. Frederick Thompson.

Clara M. Schlingheyde, a noted California suffragist, traveled to Budapest in 1913 to represent California at the congress of International Women's Suffrage Alliance.

Mary McHenry Keith continued to advocate for women's rights through her involvement with the National Woman's Party (NWP). Members of the NWP who had spent time in prison fighting for suffrage traveled to San Francisco in 1919 as part of the "Prison Special" tour. 129 women have been elected to the legislature in the state of California since 1911.

== Publications about the movement ==
Historian Delilah L. Beasley documented the numerous contributions of African American women to the suffrage cause in her 1919 self-published book The Negro Trailblazers of California. The book has remained in print for over 100 years. Suffragist Selina Solomons wrote a firsthand account of the movement shortly after the passage of proposition 4 titled, How We Won the Vote in California: A True Story of the Campaign of 1911.

== See also ==
- Bibliography of California history
- List of California suffragists
- Timeline of women's suffrage in California
- Timeline of women's suffrage in the United States
- Charlotte Perkins Gilman
- Katherine Reed Balentine
- Laura de Force Gordon
- Mary Roberts Coolidge
- Mary Wood Swift
- Myra Virginia Simmons
- Phoebe Hearst
