= College Equal Suffrage League =

American suffrage organization

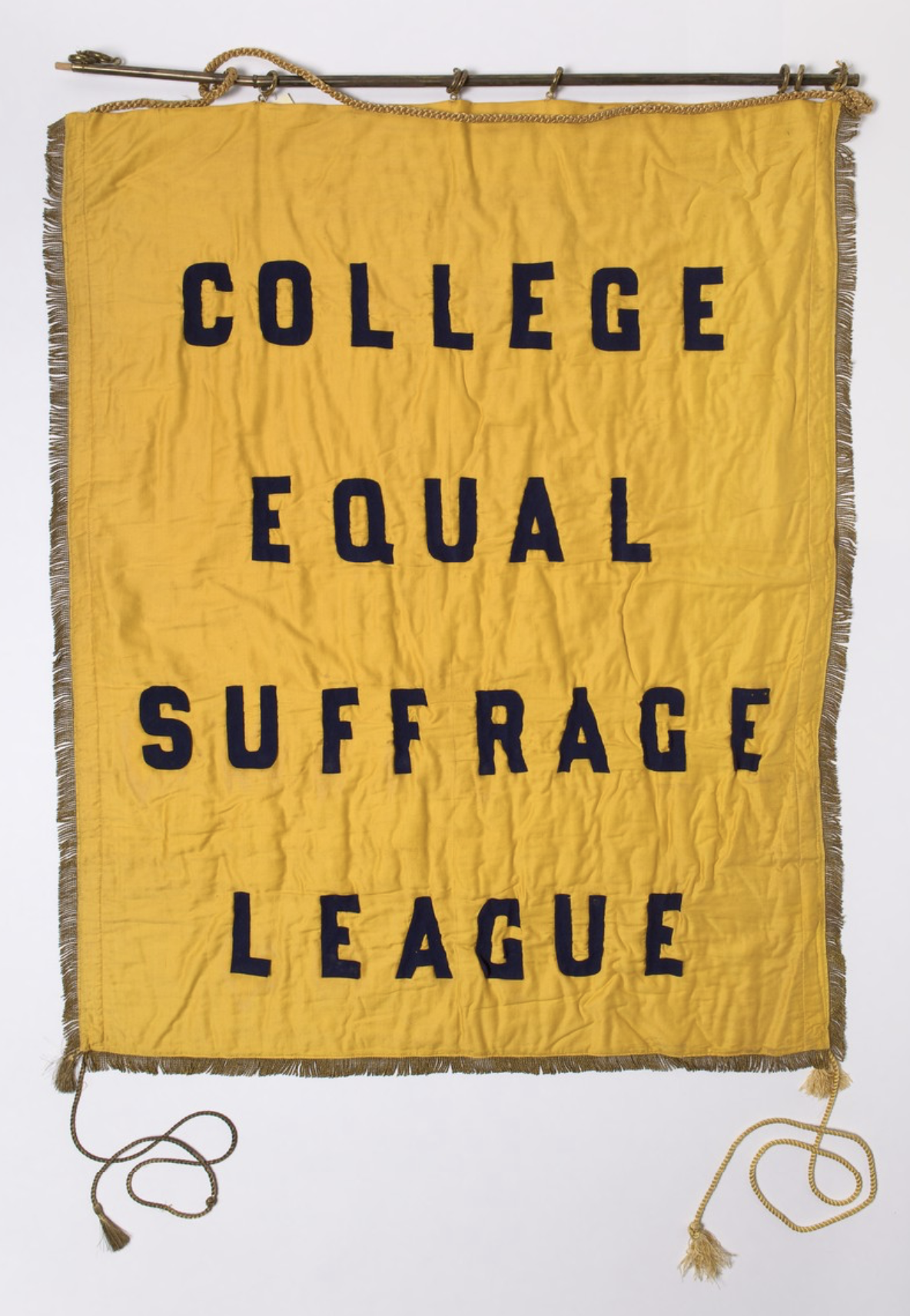
College Equal Suffrage League Banner

The College Equal Suffrage League (CESL) was an American woman suffrage organization founded in 1900 by Maud Wood Park and Inez Haynes Irwin (nee Gillmore), as a way to attract younger Americans to the women's rights movement. The League spurred the creation of college branches around the country and influenced the actions of other prominent groups such as National American Woman Suffrage Association (NAWSA).

== History ==
The beginning of the CESL dates to the 1900 NAWSA convention in Washington, D.C. Maud Wood Park, a 29-year-old attendee and recent Radcliffe College alum, realized that she was the youngest delegate. Concerned by the absence of younger members in NAWSA and the general lack of interest in suffrage among college women, Park decided to work toward recruiting a new generation to the campaign. She later commented in regard to this decision:

After hearing Miss Anthony speak I came to realize what her life had been, the heroism of her service not for herself but for the sex, and so for the whole human race. When I felt that, clearly I felt the obligation of service for the cause for which Miss Anthony and her noble associates had sacrificed so much and I promised myself then that I would try to make more women see these things as I have seen them. College women should realize their debt to the pioneers who have made our education and competence possible. They should be made to feel the obligation of their opportunities and to understand that one of the ways to pay that debt is to fight the battle for suffrage now in the quarter of the field in which it is still unwon.

Together with Inez Haynes Irwin, another Radcliffe graduate and suffrage supporter, Park formed the Massachusetts CESL in Boston. Park toured colleges around the United States, talking to recent alumnae in hopes that they would then encourage younger university and high school students to join the movement. Park's tours eventually sparked the formation of new chapters in 30 states.

In 1906, inspired by the CESL's efforts and as a way to increase their public presence, NAWSA began actively recruiting college students by sponsoring "College Evenings" at their larger suffrage events.

In 1908, the various state chapters of the CESL joined to form the National College Equal Suffrage League and became an official branch of NAWSA. Bryn Mawr College President M. Carey Thomas served as the first president and Maud Wood Park as vice president. The NCESL continued to recruit people to the suffrage cause until 1917 when the organization disbanded. Many of the League's members continued to play major roles in helping to push the Nineteenth Amendment through Congress, campaigning on the federal level and later serving in organizations like the League of Women Voters, which formed in 1920.

== Northern California chapter ==
The CESL had an active chapter in Northern California which contributed to the state's passage of women's suffrage in 1911. Suffragists involved in this chapter included:

- Kate Brousseau
- Adelaide Brown
- Genevieve Cooke, Corresponding Secretary
- Lilien Jane Martin, Third Vice-President
- Belle Judith Miller
- Ethel Moore
- Anna Elizabeth Rude, Treasurer
- Charlotte Anita Whitney, President

== Notable people ==
- Susan B. Anthony
- Caroline Lexow Babcock
- Mary Livermore Barrows
- Louise Bryant
- Elinor Byrns
- Marion Cothren
- María de López
- Rebecca Lane Hooper Eastman
- Sara Bard Field
- Edith Jordan Gardner
- Elsie Hill
- Inez Haynes Irwin
- Harriet Burton Laidlaw
- Margaret Shove Morriss
- Maud Wood Park
- Mary Gray Peck
- M. Carey Thomas

== See also ==
- Women's suffrage organizations
- List of California suffragists
- List of suffragists and suffragettes
- Timeline of women's suffrage in California
- Timeline of women's suffrage
- Women's suffrage in California
