= Fanny Jackson Coppin =

American educator (1837–1913)

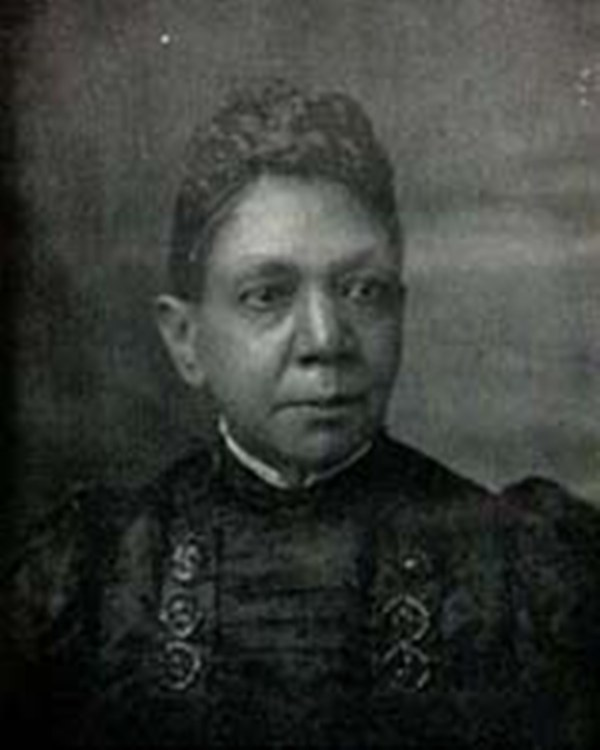
- Born: October 15, 1837; Washington, D.C., United States
- Died: January 21, 1913 (aged 76); Philadelphia, Pennsylvania, United States
- Burial place: Merion Memorial Park, Bala Cynwyd, Pennsylvania
- Education: Oberlin College (BA)
- Occupations: Teacher; Missionary
- Spouse: Levi Coppin (m. 1881)

Fanny Jackson Coppin (October 15, 1837 – January 21, 1913) was an American educator, missionary and lifelong advocate for female higher education. One of the first Black alumnae of Oberlin College, she served as principal of the Institute for Colored Youth in Philadelphia and became the first African-American school superintendent in the United States.

== Personal life ==
Born into slavery, Fanny Jackson was 12 years old when her freedom was purchased by her aunt for $125. Fanny spent the rest of her youth in Newport, Rhode Island, working as a servant for author George Henry Calvert, studying at every opportunity.

On December 21, 1881, Fanny married Reverend Levi Jenkins Coppin, a minister of the African Methodist Episcopal Church and pastor of Bethel AME Church Baltimore. Following her three decades as an educator, Fanny Jackson Coppin became more involved with her husband's religious work. In 1902 the couple went to South Africa and performed a variety of missionary work, including the founding of the Bethel Institute, a missionary school with self-help programs. After almost a decade of missionary work, Fanny Jackson Coppin's declining health forced her to return to Philadelphia, and she died on January 21, 1913. Along with many other prominent Black Philadelphians, Jackson Coppin is buried at Merion Memorial Park in Bala Cynwyd, Pennsylvania.

== Education ==
Throughout her youth, she used her earnings from her servant work to hire a tutor who guided her studies for three hours a week. With the help of a scholarship from the African Methodist Church and financial support from her aunt, Coppin was able to enroll at Oberlin College, Ohio – the first college in the United States to accept both black and female students – in 1860. Initially enrolling for the "ladies' course", Coppin switched to the more rigorous "gentlemen's course" the following year. She wrote about this experience in her autobiography:

"The faculty did not forbid a woman to take the gentleman's course, but they did not advise it. There was plenty of Latin and Greek in it, and as much mathematics as one could shoulder. Now, I took a long breath and prepared for a delightful contest. All went smoothly until I was in the junior year in College. Then, one day, the Faculty sent for me--ominous request--and I was not slow in obeying it. It was a custom in Oberlin that forty students from the junior and senior classes were employed to teach the preparatory classes. As it was now time for the juniors to begin their work, the Faculty informed me that it was their purpose to give me a class, but I was to distinctly understand that if the pupils rebelled against my teaching, they did not intend to force it. Fortunately for my training at the normal school, and my own dear love of teaching, tho there was a little surprise on the faces of some when they came into the class, and saw the teacher, there were no signs of rebellion. The class went on increasing in numbers until it had to be divided, and I was given both divisions. One of the divisions ran up again, but the Faculty decided that I had as much as I could do, and it would not allow me to take any more work."

She also recalled the pressure she felt under as a Black woman: "I never rose to recite in my classes at Oberlin but I felt that I had the honor of the whole African race upon my shoulders. I felt that, should I fail, it would be ascribed to the fact that I was colored. At one time, when I had quite a signal triumph in Greek, the Professor of Greek concluded to visit the class in mathematics and see how we were getting along. I was particularly anxious to show him that I was as safe in mathematics as in Greek. I, indeed, was more anxious, for I had always heard that my race was good in the languages, but stumbled when they came to mathematics. Now, I was always fond of a demonstration, and happened to get in the examination the very proposition that I was well acquainted with; and so went that day out of the class with flying colors."

During her years as a student at Oberlin College, she taught an evening course for free African Americans in reading and writing, and she graduated with a Bachelor's degree in 1865, becoming one of only three black women to have done so by this time (the others were Mary Jane Patterson and Frances Josephine Norris).

== Career ==
Jackson Coppin was the first black teacher at the Oberlin Academy. In 1865, she accepted a position at Philadelphia's Institute for Colored Youth (now Cheyney University of Pennsylvania). She served as the principal of the Ladies Department and taught Greek, Latin, and Mathematics. In 1869, Jackson Coppin was appointed as the principal of the Institute after the departure of Ebenezer Bassett, becoming the first African American woman to become a school principal. In her 37 years at the Institute, Fanny Jackson was responsible for vast educational improvements in Philadelphia. During her years as principal, she was promoted by the board of education to the superintendent. She was the first African American superintendent of a school district in the United States but soon went back to being a school principal. In 1893, Coppin was one of five African American women invited to speak at the World's Congress of Representative Women in Chicago, with Anna Julia Cooper, Sarah Jane Woodson Early, Fannie Barrier Williams, and Hallie Quinn Brown, where she was one of two discussants for Fannie Barrier Williams' speech, "The intellectual progress of the colored women of the United States since the Emancipation Proclamation". Jackson Coppin was politically active her entire life and frequently spoke at political rallies. She was one of the first vice presidents of the National Association of Colored Women, an early advocacy organization for black women founded by Rosetta Douglas.

== Legacy ==
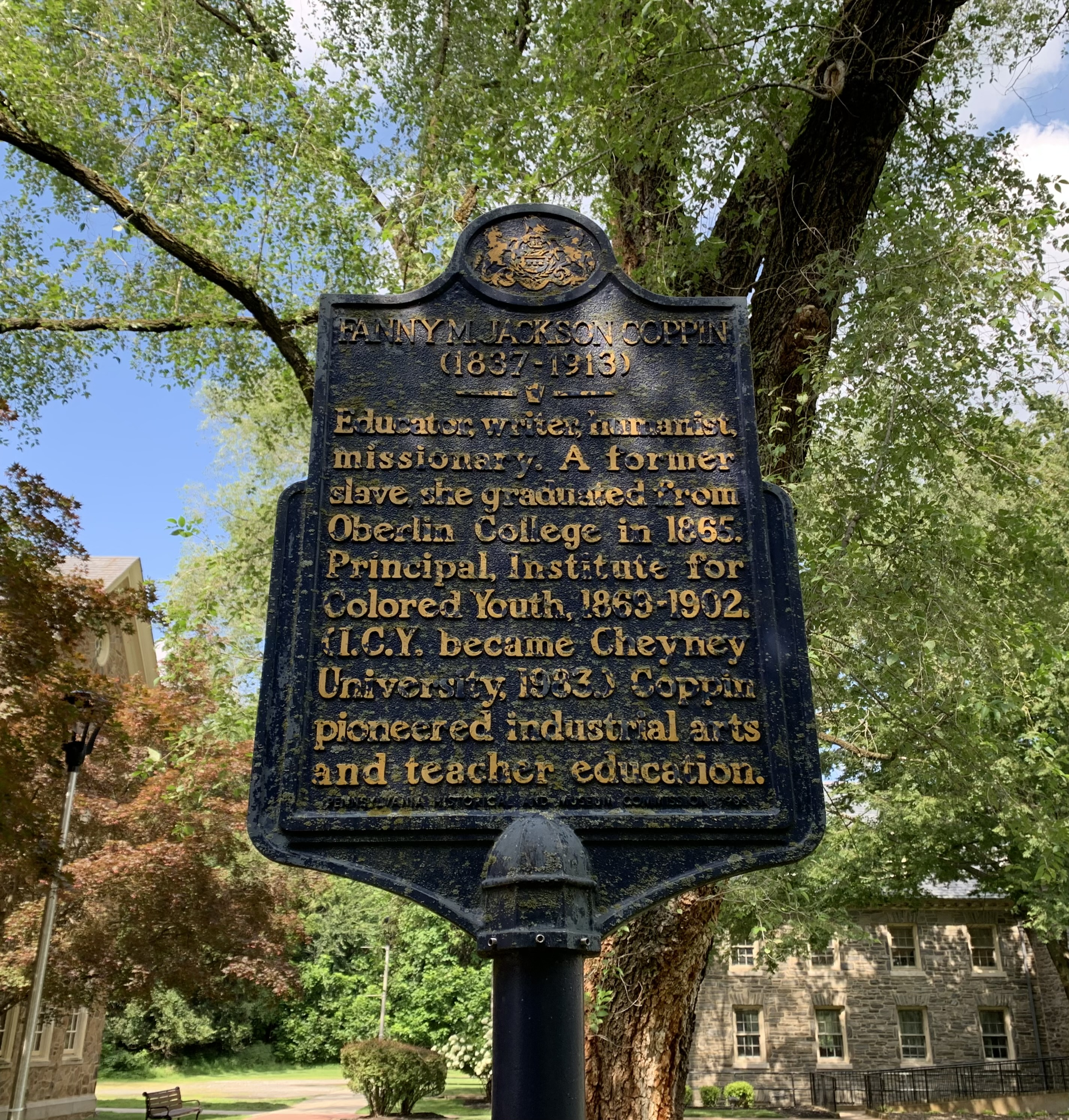
Pennsylvania state historical marker dedicated to Coppin in 1986, on the Cheyney University campus

In 1888, with a committee of women from Mother Bethel, she opened a home for destitute young women after other charities refused them admission.

In 1899, the Fannie Jackson Coppin Club was named in her honor for community oriented African-American women in Alameda County. This club played an important role in the California suffrage movement.

To illustrate her point on Black economic independence, Jackson organized an effort to save The Christian Recorder – official newspaper of the AME Church – from bankruptcy in 1879.

Jackson Coppin's Reminiscences of a School Life and Hints on Teaching – a combination of autobiography and an account of her teaching and administration at the ICY – was published in 1913.

In 1926, a Baltimore teacher-training school was named the Fanny Jackson Coppin Normal School (now Coppin State University). On February 12, 1986, the Pennsylvania Historical and Museum Commission dedicated a historical marker in honor of Coppin on the campus of Cheyney University of Pennsylvania.

On December 18, 1999, Coppin State University unveiled a bust in Jackson Coppin´s honor during their Centennial Celebration.

On June 24, 2021, the Philadelphia Board of Education voted unanimously to rename the former Andrew Jackson Elementary School in South Philadelphia after Jackson Coppin (no relation), effective July 1, 2021; the school is now named Fanny Jackson Coppin School. The formal renaming occurred on March 29, 2022. At that time, the president of Coppin State University announced the establishment of a "Philadelphia Pathway" scholarship, under which any graduate of Coppin Elementary may attend Coppin State tuition-free, upon completion of high school.

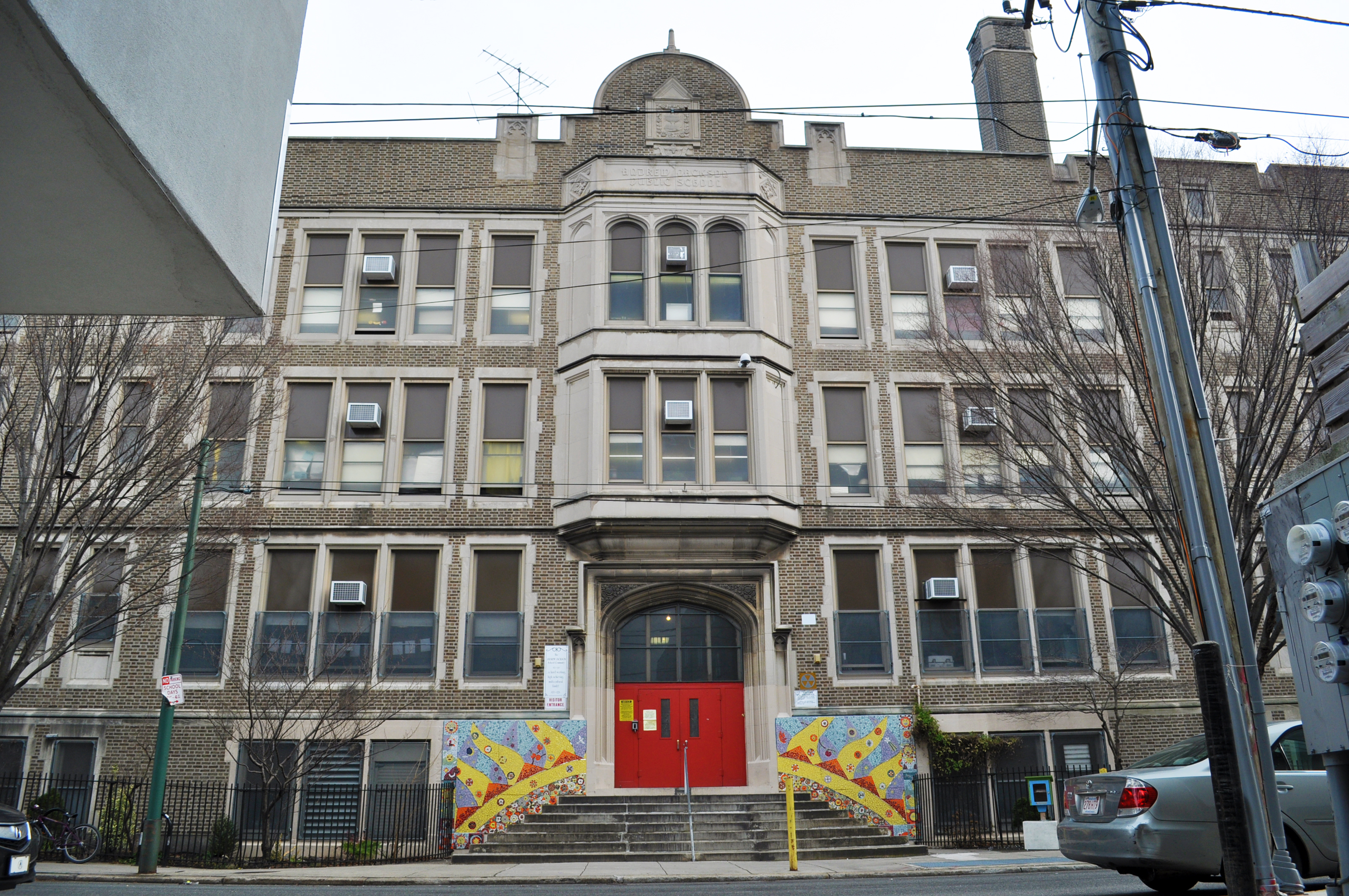
Andrew Jackson School, now Fanny Jackson Coppin School
