= Women's Legal History Biography Project =

The Stanford Law School Robert Crown Library staff, in collaboration with Professor Barbara Babcock and her students, have created a Women's Legal History Biography Project website as a resource for all who are interested in the subject of women lawyers in the United States. Its main tool is biography, a study of the lives of the individual women lawyers and the movements and philosophies that inspired and sustained them.

== Clara Shortridge Foltz ==
The project started with a single biography - that of Clara S. Foltz, the first woman lawyer in California. In the course of writing her life, Foltz's biographer, Professor Barbara Babcock, has compiled a wealth of information about her subject and the times in which she lived, and most particularly, the other women lawyers she knew. Therefore, an entire section of the website is devoted to Ms. Foltz and consists of her publications in the course of the biography-in-progress.

== Women lawyers index ==
The Women Lawyers Index is a list of all the women lawyers in the collection so far. The pioneer lawyers who are the subject of work found under other headings are listed alphabetically. Clicking on the entry takes the reader to other places on the website where the woman is discussed.
