= Woman's Club of Palo Alto =

- U.S. National Register of Historic Places
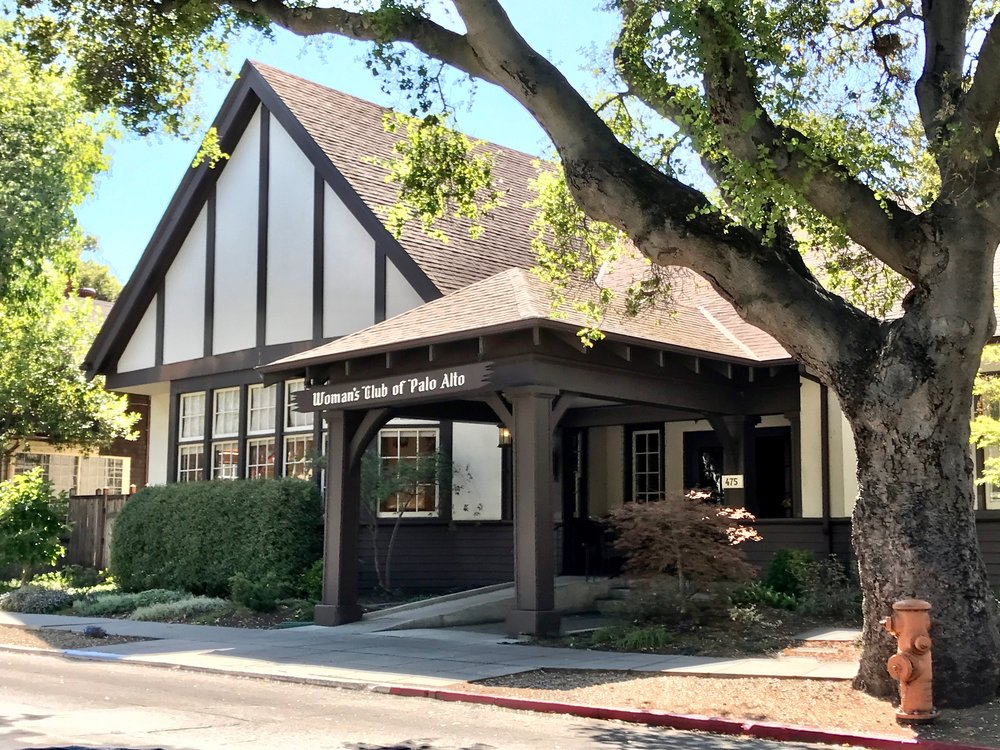
- Front of the Woman's Club of Palo Alto (WCPA)

- Location within San Francisco Bay Area Location within California Location within the United States
- Location: Palo Alto, California
- Coordinates: 37°26′46″N 122°09′21″W
- Built: 1916
- Architectural style: Tudor Craftsmen
- NRHP reference No.: 14001114
- Added to NRHP: 2014

Woman's Club of Palo Alto (founded 1894, and active to present day) is a civic, cultural, philanthropic and social club, initially founded on June 20, 1894 by 24 women in Palo Alto, California. The building that currently houses the club is historical and built in 1916 in a Tudor-Craftsman style, and is located at 475 Homer Avenue in Palo Alto. The building was listed in the National Register of Historic Places in 2014.

== Club history ==
The Woman's Club of Palo Alto was initially founded on June 20, 1894 by 24 women who gathered at a Presbyterian Church in Palo Alto, California. The first president was Mary Grafton Campbell, a doctor. Early members of the club included Anna Zschokke, a figure in the establishment of the Palo Alto Unified School District; Lydia Mitchell, who co-founded the Palo Alto Red Cross; and Julia Gilbert, a figure in the establishment of the Palo Alto libraries.

In 1898, the club formed a circulating library and donated over 2,000 books, which four years later led to the first public library in Palo Alto. In 1911, the club worked for California women's suffrage movement. From 1916 until 1929, the club members were involved in local and national issues concerning World War I, universal suffrage, and women in politics.

The club has hosted many speaking events including suffragist Hester Ann Harland, lectures by Stanford University professors, among others. In 2018, many female engineers and university students met at the club to discuss cryptocurrencies and the club served as a safe space for women in technology to meet.

== Architectural history ==
Club members raised money to buy a lot on Homer Avenue, and it took a decade to raise the remaining money for the building construction. The total cost of the new club building was $10,590.

Charles Edward Hodges (1864–1944) was the architect of the building. The style of the building is a Tudor Craftsman design. The exterior features are Craftsman with a porte-cochere doorway, heavy beams, stucco finish with a painted wood wainscoting band of lap siding at the base of the structure. The Tudor design elements include the one and a half story gable, a half timbered frame and a steeply pitched roof. The interior features a Ballroom with maple flooring and fir board and batten siding on three of the walls, and a stage with an Olio drop front curtain. There is a separate Fireside Room with salt glazed tiles from 1910 made by the Steiger Terracotta and Pottery Company of South San Francisco.

== See also ==
- List of California suffragists
- Timeline of women's suffrage in California
