= Addie L. Ballou =

American suffragist and poet (1838–1916)

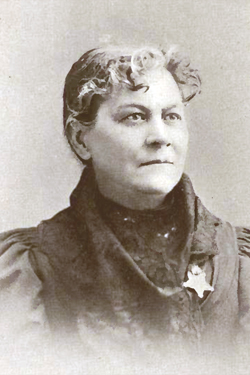
- Addie L. Ballou in 1896
- Born: Adeline Lucia Hart; April 29, 1838; Chagrin Falls, Ohio, US
- Died: August 10, 1916 (aged 79); San Francisco, California, US
- Resting place: Igo, California, US
- Occupations: Poet, lecturer, social reformer, artist
- Known for: Social Reform, Feminism, Prison Reform, Journalism, poetry, Public speaking, Notary Public, Painted Portraits
- Notable work: Driftwood, The Padre's Dream
- Spouse: Albert Darius Ballou (m. 1854, div. 1869)
- Children: 5

Addie Lucia Ballou (April 29, 1838 – August 10, 1916) was an American suffragist, poet, artist, author, and lecturer.

Ballou took an active part in the Spiritualist movement as a writer and lecturer. Her reform and philanthropy interests included prisons, the unfortunates, and fallen women. She supported Victoria Woodhull in her campaign for President of the United States in 1872.

Later, as a pioneer of California, Ballou continued her Spiritualist writing and lecturing, suffrage work, and campaigning for political change for women. She became the second female notary public in that state in 1891.

She also developed her artistic talents while studying painting at the San Francisco School of Design. In 1897, she was commissioned to paint the official portrait of the 18th governor of California, Henry Markham.

== Early life and education ==
Addie Ballou was born in Chagrin Falls, Ohio, on April 29, 1838, to Alexander Hamilton and Mary "Polly" (Eldredge) Hart, early settlers of that town. Her strictly orthodox parents were from New York, where they were married in 1827, and where three of Addie's older siblings were born. After removing to Ohio in the early 1830s, Addie was the fifth of eight children born to Alexander and Polly. However, after the death of Addie's mother in 1846, Alexander remarried three times, fathering six more children.

The early death of her mother and the removal of her family to the frontier in Wisconsin in 1849 deprived her of the opportunity of more than a year or two of a common school education.

By the late 1840s, the Hart family had moved to the "Fox Cities" area in the Eastern part of Wisconsin, settling along the northeastern tip of Lake Winnebago. In 1853 Alexander Hart was the elected chairman of the newly formed town of Lima (now Harrison) in Calumet County, Wisconsin. It was here that Addie met her future husband, Albert Darius Ballou, Lima's town clerk. Albert was also the great-grandnephew of Hosea Ballou and cousin of both Hosea Ballou II and Maturin Murray Ballou.

Addie Hart and Albert Ballou were married in Harrison on December 26, 1854. Four sons, Edward, Miner and Myron (twins), and Clarence, were born there in Calumet County (Myron died at two months of age). A daughter, Evangeline, was born in 1866 in Minnesota. The couple divorced in 1869.

== Civil War nurse ==
Although her boys were still very young at the time, Ballou offered her services to the Governor of Wisconsin during the American Civil War and began working as a nurse in camp of the 32nd Wisconsin Volunteer Infantry Regiment of the Union Army, where there were many ill and wounded. Surgeon General Erastus B. Wolcott at Milwaukee then commissioned her, and she went with the regiment to Memphis, Tennessee, where she came to be known as "The Little Mother."

She went on to write many poems about the Civil War and her experiences connected with her participation.

Ballou was the only woman honored as a member of the James A. Garfield Grand Army of the Republic (G.A.R.) San Francisco unit.

In 1892 she helped reorganize the Civil War nurses (formerly called the Ex-Army Nurses' Association) into a newly named affiliation: the National Association of Army Nurses of the Late War, and, for her efforts, was elected their first President. The group would later, in 1901, become the National Association of Army Nurses of the Civil War.

== Post-war life ==
Addie Ballou was active in the Spiritualist reform movement, which included support of suffrage activities. A frequent speaker at both Spiritualist and Women Suffrage conventions, she spoke alongside Susan B. Anthony at Farwell Hall in Chicago, June 1870.

As the wave for suffrage began to swell, Ballou went with others to Washington, D.C., in January 1872 for the semi-annual National Woman Suffrage Convention held at Lincoln Hall. Present (among others) were Elizabeth Cady Stanton, Susan B. Anthony, Laura de Force Gordon, Mrs. Cuppy Smith, Victoria Woodhull, and the "highly inspirational and eloquent Addie Ballou." This gathering was to present the signed petition, containing 45,000 names of women, to the Judiciary committees of Congress, demanding their rights at the ballot box, as given by the 14th and 15th amendments. Ballou's poem "Song of Victory" reflects that experience.

A journalist and lecturer on temperance, women's suffrage, prison reform, Ballou also wrote poems that were published in newspapers across the country. She would publish two books of her poetry: Driftwood and The Padre's Dream and Other Poems.

Ballou's mediumistic tendencies were discovered at a young age and focused into speaking and writing as an adult. After her divorce in 1869, she traveled extensively, lecturing and preaching Spiritualism. She also became legally authorized to perform marriage ceremonies by a letter of fellowship from the Religio-Philosophical Society.

Under the auspices of the Victorian Association of Progressive Spiritualists, Ballou traveled to Melbourne, in the summer of 1885. She presented a series of lectures at the Bijou Theatre, as a representative of allied psychic societies in the United States. Thomas Welton Stanford, co-founder of the Australian sponsoring association and brother of Leland Stanford and Charles Stanford, invited her to stay on after her lecture series as a guest in Thomas Stanford's Melbourne mansion. She stayed for three years, conducting psychic phenomena investigations and painting numerous pieces for Mr. Stanford's extensive art collection.

Ballou exhibited her work at the Woman's Building at the 1893 World's Columbian Exposition in Chicago, Illinois.

== California and later life ==
Ballou first ventured to the Pacific coast in 1874, whereupon she continued her speaking engagements and writing. She also began studying painting under Virgil Williams, the first director and teacher of the San Francisco School of Design (now the San Francisco Art Institute). She became a well-known artist and received proper recognition. Her portrait of Henry Markham, Governor of California 1891–1895, hangs in the State Capitol in Sacramento, California. Her portraits of other notables were: George Tisdale Bromley, John Brown, J. W. Burling, William Edward Bushnell, John Wallace "Captain Jack" Crawford, Michael Harry de Young, Ulysses S. Grant as well as his three sons, Abraham Lincoln, William McKinley, William S. Moses, "Emperor" Joshua Abraham Norton, Thomas Paine, Philip Augustine Roach, Jane Lathrop Stanford, and Thomas Welton Stanford. Her recollections about painting Emperor Norton's portrait in 1877 were published in The Forgotten Characters of Old San Francisco where she claimed to be the only artist Norton sat for. Whether he sat for her is uncertain, but she was almost certainly not the only artist he sat for.

Ballou was also known for painting landscapes, fruit, and controversial nudes. The painting Morning was refused at the 1890 California State Fair in Sacramento because of its subject matter (nude) and realism; however, Thomas Stanford purchased the piece the following year.

She remained heavily involved in multiple political and women's reform organizations, including the California State Women's Suffrage Association with Laura de Force Gordon. In 1891, working alongside Clara Foltz for progressive legislation, Ballou appeared before the California State Legislature promoting a bill which would allow appointment of women as notaries. Clara Foltz became the California's first female notary; Ballou the second, by appointment of Governor Henry Markham.

Ballou maintained an office and studio in the Donohoe Building, 1170 Market Street, San Francisco when the 1906 earthquake and fires occurred. She lost all documents and paintings not at her residence, 408 30th Street, San Francisco, which was spared.

Addie L. Ballou died at her home in San Francisco, August 10, 1916. She is interred in an unmarked grave in the family plot in Igo, Shasta County, California.

== Published works ==
- Driftwood (1899)
- The Padre's Dream and Other Poems (1915)

== See also ==
- List of civil rights leaders
- List of suffragists and suffragettes
- Timeline of the California women's suffrage movement
- Women's suffrage in California
- Women's suffrage in the United States
