= Fannie Jackson Coppin Club =

The Fannie Jackson Coppin Club, also known as the Fanny Jackson Coppin Club, was a club for politically active African American women located in Alameda County, California. The club played an important role in community outreach to voters before and after the passage of Proposition 4 in 1911 which granted women in California the right to vote. Many of the women involved in the club were active in the California suffrage movement.

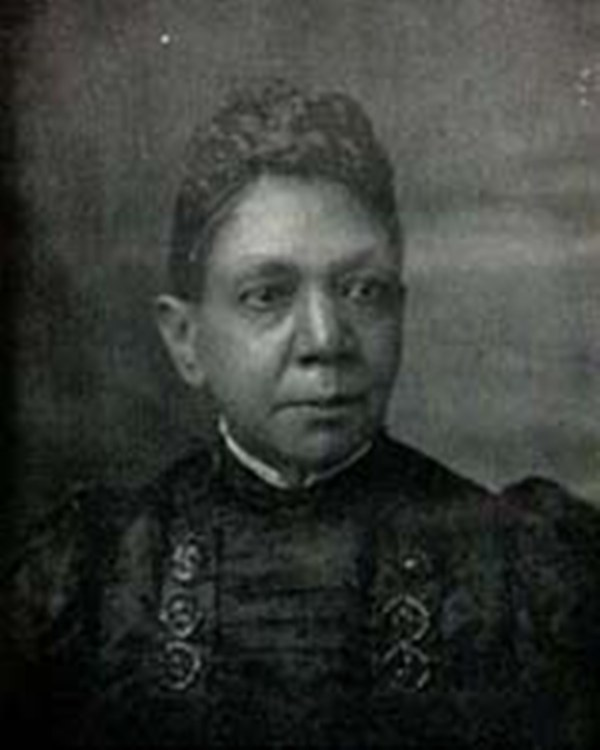
Fanny Jackson Coppin

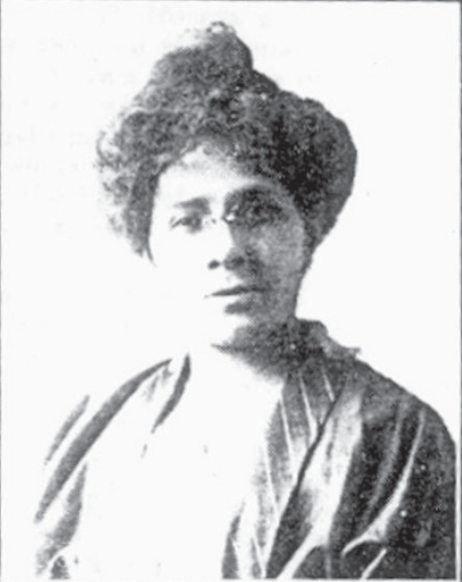
Hettie Blonde Tilghman, member of the Fannie Jackson Coppin Club

== History of the club ==
The Fannie Jackson Coppin Club was formed in Oakland, California on June 20, 1899 by women of the Beth Eden Baptist Church. It was the first of its kind and today is known as the "mother club" of the African American women's club movement in California. Originally called the Cosmos Club, the Fannie Jackson Coppin Club was founded after African American women in Oakland were inspired by the visit of Victoria Earl Matthews in 1898, who enthusiastically advised them to start an organization after sharing the amazing work that women’s clubs were doing across the country. The club was an example of the formal and informal “uplift” organizations that were being established by African American women in California as they aimed to raise the standards of all African American women and their families to counteract racist accusations of immorality. The club's name was changed after Fanny Jackson Coppin personally visited the group shortly after it was formed and inspired the club members to add philanthropy and literary education to their mission. Along with their philanthropic endeavors, the objective of the Fannie Jackson Coppin Club was to organize musical and literary programs in order to encourage members to participate in those fields. The club's first philanthropic act was donating $100 to the Tuskegee Institute in order to keep a young boy in school for one year.

The stated goal of the club was to study culture and community improvement. The state motto of the club was "Deeds Not Words." It also used the motto "Lifting as We Climb". It also uses the mottos “Lifting as we Climb” and “Not failure, but low aim is a crime.” After being incorporated into the Northern Federation of Colored Women’s Clubs in 1913, club women opened the Northern Federation Home and Day Nursery in 1918 which acted as an orphanage and cared for African American children aged five to fourteen years old. Focusing on African American success as another one of their missions, they hosted world-renowned tenor Roland Hayes in March 1919 where he performed for his first California audience. During its heyday, the club served as a "mother club" for black club women in California. Journalist and historian Delilah Beasley reported on the activities of the club in her popular column, "Activities Among the Negroes."

== Home for the Aged and Infirm Colored People ==
One of the notable 19th century projects organized by the club was the club's involvement in the creation of the Home for the Aged and Infirm Colored People in Oakland, California. This was the first organization to provide care for elderly African Americans in the state of California.

== Membership ==
Members included many notable Oakland area suffragists and club women including Melba Stafford, Willa Henry, Emma Scott and Hettie B. Tilghman.

== Legacy of the club ==
Club members created a wide variety of organizations aimed to improve the lives of African Americans in the east bay. Hettie B. Tilghman, Willa Henry, Melba Stafford and Delilah Beasley were very community oriented and in 1920 they created the Linden Center Young Women's Christian Association. The Linden Center YWCA offered vocational training as well as cultural programs. Despite the creation of independent organizations that grew out of the Fannie Jackson Coppin club, it remained intact and lasted well into the 1960s.

Along with the YWCA, members of the Fannie Jackson Coppin Club joined numerous social and women’s clubs that were established to push women’s suffrage or uplift African American women. Organizations that club members were also a part of include: the California Civic League, the Alameda County League of Colored Women Voters, the Colored American Equal Suffrage League, the California State Federation of Colored Women’s Clubs, the Alameda County Central Committee of the Republican Party, N.A.A.C.P., and the Art Department of the California Federation of Colored Women's Clubs.

== See also ==
- Fanny Jackson Coppin
- List of California suffragists
- Timeline of the women's suffrage movement in California
- Women's suffrage in California
