= Margaret Shove Morriss =

American academic historian

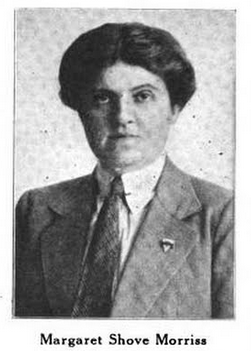
Margaret Shove Morriss, from a 1919 publication.

Margaret Shove Morriss (June 25, 1884 – January 22, 1975) was an American academic historian, She was the Dean of Women in charge of Pembroke College in Brown University from 1923 to 1950.

== Early life and education ==
Margaret Shove Morriss was born in Poughkeepsie, New York, the daughter of William Hayles Morriss and Mary Elizabeth Hairland Morriss. She completed undergraduate studies at Goucher College in 1904, and was granted a PhD from Bryn Mawr College in 1911, for her research on trade in colonial Maryland.

== Career ==
Morriss began her career at Mount Holyoke College, teaching American history. While there, she was active in the local chapter of the College Equal Suffrage League. In 1923, she was hired by Brown University to serve a professor of history and as Dean of Women, a post she held until she retired in 1950. She more than doubled the number of women enrolled at Brown during her tenure, and saw the 1927 creation of a Women's Building on campus. Her name was sometimes lampooned as "Peggy Push" (from "Margaret Shove"), to emphasize her assertive style of leadership. In 1951, Brown established a Margaret S. Morriss Scholarship in her honor. A dormitory built in 1960 was named for Morriss.

From 1917 to 1920, during World War I, she joined the Young Women's Christian Association efforts in France, Germany, and New York, as director of recreation for nurses. During World War II, she was president of the American Association of University Women (AAUW) (1937-1941) and president of the New England Association of Schools and Colleges (1941). In 1965 the Connecticut chapter of the AAUW established an international fellowship in her name.

== Personal life ==
Morriss was a member of the Society of Friends, the National Consumers League, and the League of Women Voters. She was also vice president of the Association of Women Deans.

Morriss died in 1975, aged 90 years.
