= María de López =

American suffragist and educator (1881–1977)

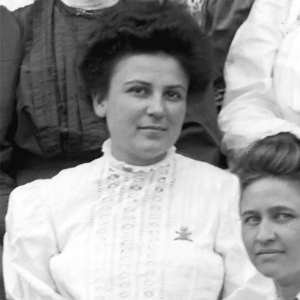
- Born: 1881; San Gabriel, California
- Died: 1977 (aged 95–96); Orange, California
- Education: Pasadena High School; Los Angeles Normal School
- Known for: Women's suffrage activism
- Father: Juan López
- Relatives: Ernestina de López (sister)

María Guadalupe Evangelina de López (1881-1977) was an American activist in the Women's suffrage movement in California. In the 1910s, she campaigned and translated at rallies in Southern California, where suffragists distributed tens of thousands of pamphlets in Spanish.

== Early life ==
When she was a child, de López lived in San Gabriel, Los Angeles. La Casa Vieja de López was the home for Juan López, María de López's father. He moved into this home in 1849. Members of his family occupied the house until 1964, and when María de Lopez retired she lived in her ancestral adobe. The home is currently closed to the public. Her father was a blacksmith, Juan Nepomiceno López, and her mother was Guadalupe. She had a sister named Ernestina de López, who was also educated. The eldest daughter in her family, Belen, lived at home and worked as a seamstress and was not able to seek further education because she had to help at home. By the 1890s, all of the older children in her family had left the house, and two sisters of María de López had married and left home. This made it financially easier on the parents and made it possible for María and Ernestina de López to stay in school. When their father died in 1904, both sisters returned home to San Gabriel to live with their mother, and they supported her financially by working as Spanish teachers.

== Early career ==
María de López had a long work history in the field of education. She was a teacher at Los Angeles High School, where she taught English as a second language course. María de López worked at the University of California, Los Angeles, as a translator. In 1902, she became the youngest instructor at the University of California, making her possibly the first Latina to teach at UCLA. In the 1930s, she served as president of the UCLA faculty women's club.

== Suffrage work ==
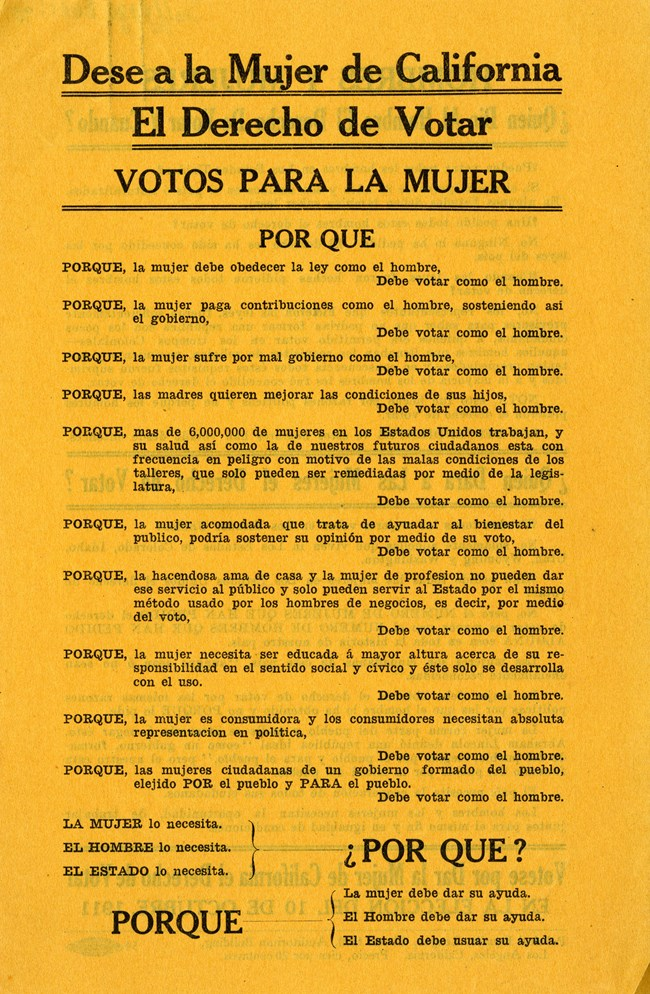
1911 Spanish language pamphlet for the Los Angeles Political Equality League by María de López.

de López was a member of the Los Angeles-based Votes for Women Club alongside Cora Lewis, Martha Salyer, Clara Shortridge Foltz, and Mary Foy which was formerly known as the Equality Club. On October 3, 1911, the Votes for Women Club held a large rally at the plaza, which featured María de López giving her speech in Spanish. She was a member in Women's College Club, Women's Business Club, and the Executive Board of the high school teachers' association of Los Angeles.

She was also the president of the College Equal Suffrage League of Southern California when suffrage was won in 1911. That year she published an article in the Los Angeles Herald calling for equal rights for women and men as foundational in a democracy. The Los Angeles Herald also noted 1913 that de López was chosen to be one of the suffragists representing California to march in the 1913 suffrage parade in Washington, D.C., organized by suffragists Alice Paul and Lucy Burns. It is unknown if de López attended the 1913 suffrage parade or not.

de López was a Spanish-language translator for the suffrage movement during the 1911 state-wide campaign. She "[i]nstituted a campaign among the Spaniards and the Mexicans and toured the state giving suffrage lectures in Spanish." María de López is credited as the first person to make speeches in California on equal suffrage in the Spanish language. She also gave speeches on suffrage in English.

== Involvement in World War I ==
During World War I, María de López temporarily gave up her teaching job and moved to New York City. There she trained as an ambulance driver. She also learned to fly a plane and served in the ambulance corps in France. She was later cited for bravery by the French government.

== Personal life ==
María de López was also known as Lupe, Eva, and Marie. In 1897 she graduated from Pasadena High School, and then she graduated from the Los Angeles Normal School, a teaching college. María de López married Hugh Lowther, a professor at Occidental College. After marriage, she became María de López Lowther or sometimes María de López de Lowther. The 1930 census said de Lopez was married at age 38.
