= Elizabeth Margaret Vater Longley =

British journalist, suffragist and typing innovator (1830–1912)

Elizabeth Margaret Vater Longley (née Vater; 1830–1912) was a British-American journalist, suffragist, and innovator in typing.

== Biography ==
Elizabeth Margaret Vater Longley was born in England in 1830. During her childhood, she emigrated to the United States with her family. Elizabeth Vater married Elias Longley in 1847. At the time, they lived in a Cincinnati utopian community. Elias Longley was a stenographic reporter, advocate of phonetic spelling, and ran a publishing company.

Longley was an early adopter of the mechanical typewriter. She invented an early type of touch typing called the "All-Finger method," which used eight fingers on home keys. She had presented this method by August 1882.

Longley worked as the editor of the Dayton Women's Advocate in 1859. Longley became a member of the executive committee of the National Women's Suffrage Association and vice president of the Ohio association.

In 1885, the Longleys moved to California. In the 1890s, Margaret ran the Los Angeles Campaign Committee for a referendum on suffrage.
