= Georgianna Offutt =

American clubwoman and suffragist

Personal details
- Born: August 21, 1868 St. Louis, Missouri, U.S.
- Died: October 7, 1949 (aged 81) Los Angeles, California, U.S.
- Occupation: Podiatrist

Georgianna K. Offutt (August 21, 1868 – October 7, 1949) was an American podiatrist, clubwoman, and suffragist, and the second vice-president of Alameda County League of Colored Women Voters.

Offutt was a practicing podiatrist in the Los Angeles area for 25 years. She was the president of the local Sojourner Truth Club, and, along with Emma Lou Sayers and Dr. Vada J. Somerville, helped create a voter education program for Black voters. She faced prejudice in medical circles and was outspoken about these difficulties; she wrote a newspaper article for the California Eagle called "Negro Woman in the Medical World" giving testimonials about the poor treatment she and other Black women received.

== Personal life ==
Offutt was born in St. Louis, Missouri. She attended Lincoln University in Jefferson City, and then worked as a teacher. She married Roddum Kenner in 1890, with whom she had a son, Byron. Following Kenner's death in 1893, she moved to California. While in California, attended the College of Chiropody in San Francisco, California where she received a doctorate in Orthopedic and Surgical Chiropody in 1922. In 1897 she married Boone Offutt; he died in 1935. They had one daughter, Ruby, in 1900.

Offutt died in Los Angeles on October 7, 1949.
