= Selina Solomons =

American suffragist and writer (1862–1942)

- Born: November 22, 1862; California, United States
- Died: February 9, 1942 (aged 79)
- Education: University of California, Berkeley
- Known for: California women's suffrage movement
- Notable work: How We Won the Vote in California (1912)

Selina Solomons (November 22, 1862 – February 9, 1942) was an American suffragist and writer. She was known for the campaign for Women's suffrage in California, which resulted in the passage of Proposition 4. Solomons wrote a first hand account of the movement titled How We Won the Vote in California.

== Family, education and religious background ==
Solomons was born on November 22,1862 in California to a sephardic Jewish family with roots in the United States. She was the eldest child of Seixas Solomons and Hannah Marks Solomons. Despite a humble background, her father founded one of the first Jewish temples in the state of California.

Solomons had five younger siblings, including brothers Theodore Seixas Solomons, a mountaineer; Leon Mendez Solomons, a scholar who died aged 26; and Lucius Levy Solomons, a lawyer. One of her sisters died from typhus as a child and her other sister Adele Solomons earned a medical degree and became a physician.

Solomons did not practice Judaism, corresponded with Carl Jung and joined the local Theosophical Society in San Francisco, of which her mother was a founding member.

Solomons completed two years of higher education at the University of California, Berkeley in Berkeley, California. She had to leave before graduating to support her family as a piano and English teacher.

== Involvement with the California suffrage movement ==
Solomons worked with notable California suffragists including Maud Younger and Lillian Coffin Harris. These women all worked together in September 1911 to form an election committee. This committee would serve as a coalition of a variety of suffrage groups active throughout the state. Women won the vote in California on October 10, 1911.

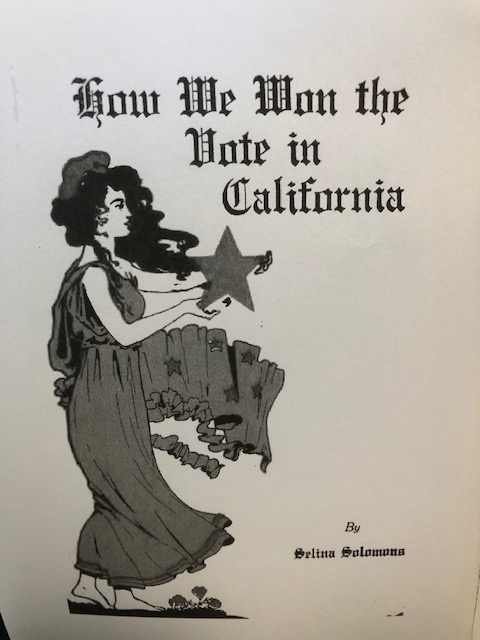
Cover of Solomons' book How we won the vote in California (1912)

=== Votes for Women Club ===
Solomons believed the 1896 defeat of the women's suffrage movement in Canada was due in part to a lack of emphasis on organizing working-class women. She was critical of the first all-women's club in the state, the Century Club, which she felt was "elitist."

To address this, she opened the Votes for Women Club in a loft near Union Square in San Francisco. By 1910, the club was receiving publicity in local newspapers. It was initially intended to appeal to shop girls and clerks. Reading materials on the suffrage movement were widely available in the club and it also offered food.

Under Solomons leadership, in 1910, the Votes for Women Club also aimed to combat the "white slave trade" in girls which was a euphemism in this era for prostitution. It was in 1910 that the Mann Act was passed (previously called the White-Slave Traffic Act of 1910).

In 1912, Solomons attended the California Equal Suffrage Association convention in her role as president of the Votes for Women Club.

=== Writing ===
Solomons wrote a first hand account of the suffrage movement titled How We Won the Vote in California (1912). The book outlined the campaigning, from lobbying to fundraising.

Solomons also wrote poetry which explored women's issues, such as Agnodice, Miriam’s Lullaby, and The Girl from Colorado.

== Death ==
Solomons died in 1942, aged 79.
