= Elizabeth Schenck =

Elizabeth T. Schenck (? - 1884) was an American woman suffrage activist in California. She was one of the founders of the San Francisco County Woman Suffrage Association, along with Emily Pitts Stevens. The Association, founded in July 1869, was the first woman suffrage organization on the Pacific Coast. Schenck also wrote the chapter on California for Volume 3 of the History of Woman Suffrage She served as the vice president of the National Woman Suffrage Association, representing California.
