= Ada Chastina Bowles =

American Universalist minister

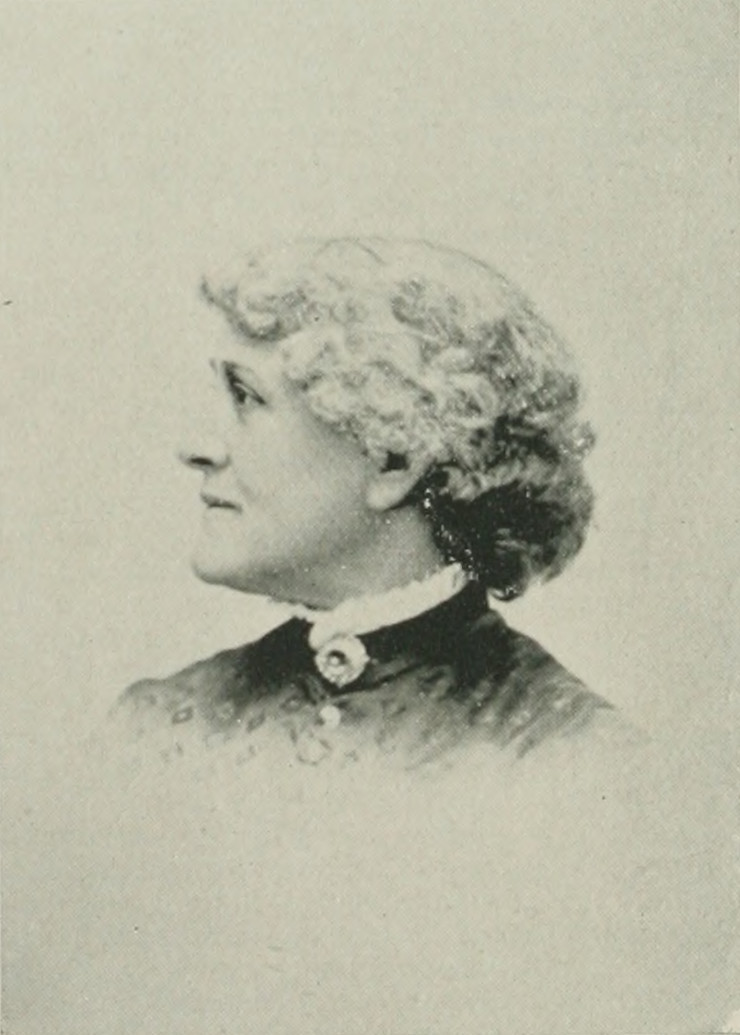
- "A Woman of the Century"
- Born: Ada Chastina Burpee; August 2, 1836; Gloucester, Massachusetts
- Died: August 30, 1928 (aged 92)
- Occupation: Universalist minister
- Spouse: Benjamin F. Bowles

Ada Chastina Burpee Bowles (August 2, 1836 – August 30, 1928) was a Universalist minister.

== Early life and education ==
Ada Chastina Burpee was born in Gloucester, Massachusetts, on August 2, 1836. After easily and rapidly learning all that was taught in the public schools of Gloucester, she studied by herself.

== Career ==
At the age of fifteen, she began to teach in the public schools. She continued until she was twenty-two, at the same time writing for the press.

Her success with an adult Bible class led her to expand her theological study. Her husband encouraged her to preach the gospel. She began in 1869 in New England. In 1872 she was licensed in Boston to preach and became the non-resident pastor of a church in Marlborough, Massachusetts. Her husband at the same time settled in Cambridge, and accepted a call to the pastorate of the Church of the Restoration in Philadelphia, while Bowles was called as non-resident pastor of the Universalist Church in Easton, Pennsylvania, a position she held for three years. She left that parish to lay the foundation of a new church in Trenton, New Jersey.

She was regularly ordained in 1874, and preached and lectured since then in most of the large cities of the United States. When without a church of her own, she shared the parish work of her husband and was constantly engaged in charitable and philanthropic work.

In addition to all her ministerial work, she lectured in various parts of the country under the auspices of the Woman's Christian Temperance Union, in which organization she was state superintendent of various departments. She was national lecturer of the American Woman Suffrage Association and president of State, county and city suffrage organizations, as well as an active member of many other reforms.

Notwithstanding all the duties and labors, she was famed among her acquaintances as a wise and affectionate mother and a model housekeeper. One of her most popular lectures was on "Strong-minded Housekeeping" which embodied her own experience in household cares and management.

In 1892, she published The Old Man of the Mountain and Old Mother Ann.

== Personal life ==
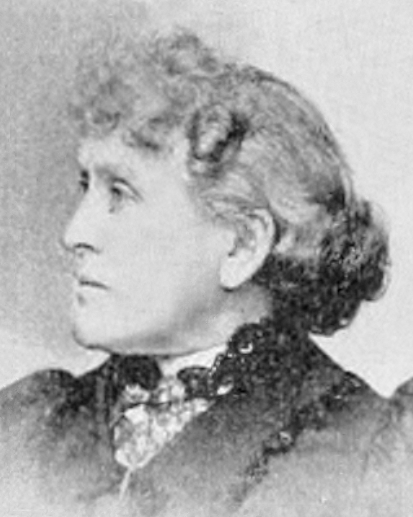
undated photo

She married Rev. Benjamin F. Bowles (1824-1892), pastor of the Universalist Church in Melrose, Massachusetts. She became the stepmother of three children, and later the mother of three more. She was an expert swimmer and could handle a saw, hammer or rolling-pin with equal dexterity.

She lived at Abington, Massachusetts.

She died on August 30, 1928, and is buried at Mount Auburn Cemetery, Cambridge, Evergreen Path Lot 1334.
