= Myra Virginia Simmons =

US women's suffragist

- Born: June 8, 1880
- Died: March 16, 1965 (aged 84)
- Citizenship: United States
- Organization: Women's Christian Temperance Union
- Known for: Suffragist

Myra Virginia Simmons (June 8, 1880 – March 16, 1965) was a California suffragist and leader of the Colored American Equal Suffrage League (CAESL). She was a prominent Bay Area community organizer who served as Chair of the Women's Civic and Progressive League in Oakland.

== Suffrage work ==
Simmons was a California suffragist who served as president of the Colored American Equal Suffrage League (CAESL). She was active in the Women's Christian Temperance Union and often organized events at her church to promote the suffrage cause. Simmons was politically active in the 1910s and her suffrage work was mentioned several times in the San Francisco Call newspaper. In 1911 she was the keynote speaker at a gathering of suffragists of color at the North Oakland Baptist Church. She was serving as President of the Colored Women's Suffrage League that year, which was the year women in California won the right to vote. Simmons served as a precinct captain on election day.

== Political work post-suffrage ==
After women won the right to vote in California, Simmons organized women voters to encourage them to be politically active. On November 23, 1911 The San Francisco Call reported that she was chairing a new "Women's Civic and Progressive League" to educate newly enfranchised female voters. In 1912 she participated in a conference which aimed to reduce gambling as part of the northern branch of the California Civic League. Dozens of delegates were sent to this regional conference for women and Simmons participated as representative for the Alameda County Colored Americans. In 1915 she served as Chairman of the Alameda County Day Committee. That year she also served as president of the Civic Center, a club for Black women.

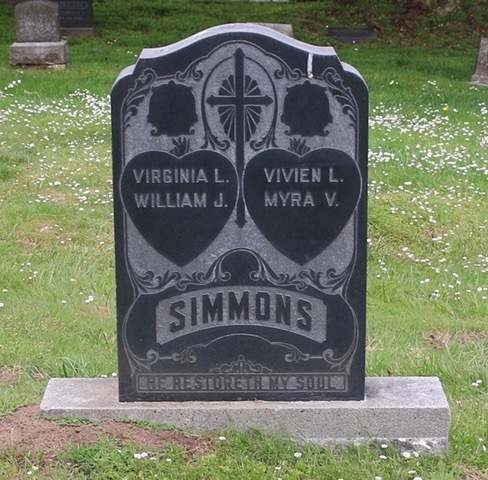
Tombstone for Myra V. Simmons

== Personal life ==
Myra Virginia Simmons was originally from Berkeley, California. According to the 1900 federal census, Simmons and her mother were born in California and her father was born in Jamaica. In order to fund her education, Simmons worked as a domestic and sold newspapers. In the 1930 census she was recorded as living with her aunt in San Francisco. After a long career in civic engagement, Simmons died in 1965 and was buried in Cypress Lawn cemetery in San Bruno, California. A 2019 project by the National Women's History Alliance included her as part of their work to recognize the grave sites of California suffragists which was documented by the historian at Cypress Lawn.

== Additional sources ==
1. "New Organization Outgrowth of Suffrage League", San Francisco Call, Volume 110 #176 November 23, 1911
2. "Annexed District to be Invaded", Oakland Tribune, October 4, 1911
3. Oakland Sunshine, Vol. 13, No. 1, Ed. 1 March 29, 1915
4. The Western Outlook (San Francisco, Oakland and Los Angeles, Calif.), Vol. 21, No. 41, Ed. 1 Saturday, July 3, 1915
5. "Negroes to Help in Civic Improvement", San Francisco Call, February 26, 1912, page 8
