= Ellen Clark Sargent =

American women's suffragist (1826-1911)

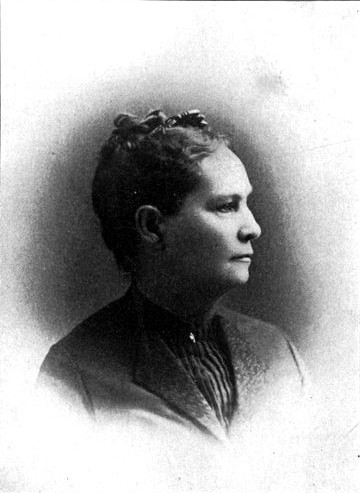
- Born: Ellen Clark; 1826; Massachusetts, U.S.
- Died: July 13, 1911 (aged 84–85); San Francisco, California, U.S.
- Spouse: Aaron Augustus Sargent (m. 1852; died 1887)

Ellen Clark Sargent (Massachusetts, 1826–1911) was an active American women's suffragist. She was influential in advocacy for the Nineteenth Amendment to the United States Constitution, which sought to give women the right to vote.

== Early life ==
Ellen Clark was born in Massachusetts in 1826. As a teenager in Newburyport, Massachusetts, she fell in love with Aaron Augustus Sargent, 1 year her junior, an aspiring journalist and politician. Both taught Sunday school in the local Methodist Church.

In 1847 Aaron Sargent left Ellen to go west. By 1849, he came to Nevada City, California, to search for gold. He built a four-room house on Broad Street and in early 1852 returned to Newburyport, where he and Ellen were married on March 15. They arrived in Nevada City that October. Ellen wrote of her arrival:

"My good husband had before my arrival provided for me a one story house of four rooms including a good sized pantry where he had already stored a bag of flour, a couple of pumpkins and various other edibles ready for use."

== Suffrage advocacy ==
While Aaron prospered in business, politics and the law, Ellen raised three children: daughters Ellen and Elizabeth and son George. She also advocated for women's rights, and in 1869 founded the Nevada County Women's Suffrage Organization. Soon afterward, she became president of the California Woman Suffrage Association. In 1869, Susan B. Anthony and Elizabeth Cady Stanton founded the National Woman Suffrage Association, to advocate for a constitutional amendment granted women the right to vote. Ellen became its treasurer.

=== Friendship with Susan Anthony ===
Susan B. Anthony was a close friend of Sargent, and a frequent guest in the Sargent homes in California and Washington D.C. In 1872, Aaron was elected to the United States Senate and the Sargent family moved to Washington. Their relationship was such that Anthony accompanied the Sargent family on their trip across the country.

=== Nineteenth Amendment ===
In 1878, Aaron, while a Senator, had proposed a constitutional amendment giving women the right to vote, but it was not passed. The bill was reintroduced in 1919 and enacted in 1920 as the Nineteenth Amendment to the United States Constitution.

== Later life ==
Sargent lived in Washington, on and off, for 12 years. She accompanied Aaron to Germany, when he was appointed U.S. Minister. After Aaron died in 1887, she returned to San Francisco, where the Sargents had bought a home before he was elected to the Senate. She continued her activities with the California Suffrage Association and the National American Women Suffrage Association. She also co-founded the Century Club, San Francisco's first women's club, which still exists.

At the age of 74, she became a tax protester. Her position was simple: why should she have to pay taxes to a government that wouldn't let her vote. She lost her court case, but continued to file tax protests. Her actions caused other wealthy women taxpayers to also protest. Finally in 1911, a California referendum amended the California Constitution to give women the right to vote.

Ellen died on July 13, 1911, in San Francisco during the campaign. The City of San Francisco held its first public memorial for a woman, and state flags were flown at half-mast.
