= Kate Brousseau =

American professor and researcher on mental hygiene

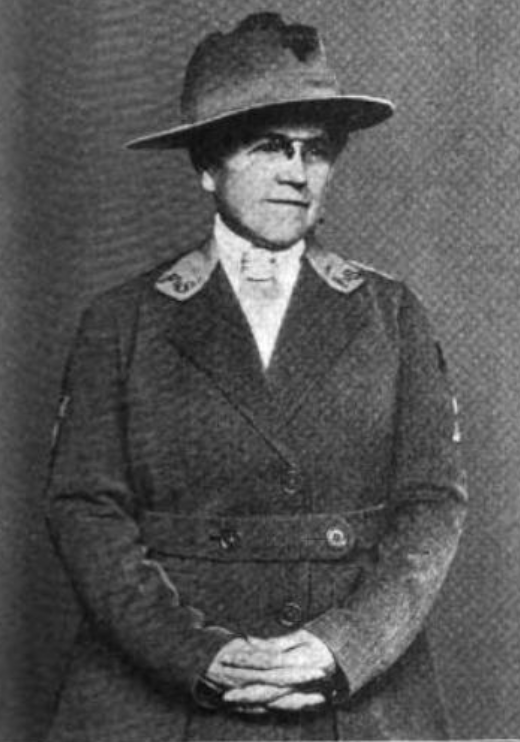
- Kate Brousseau, from a 1920 publication
- Born: April 24, 1862; Ypsilanti, Michigan
- Died: July 8, 1938 (aged 76); California
- Occupations: College professor, war worker

Kate Brousseau (April 24, 1862 – July 8, 1938) was an American professor and researcher on mental hygiene, chair of the Psychology Department at Mills College.

== Early life ==
Kate Brousseau was born on April 24, 1862, in Ypsilanti, Michigan, daughter of Judge Julius Brousseau (1834–1903), born in New York by French Canadian parents, and Caroline Yakeley (1834–1901), of English and German heritage. Brousseau was the older of four siblings.

Brousseau was educated at Los Angeles High School and Los Angeles State Normal school (later University of California, Los Angeles). She was valedictorian of her class, the first graduating from Los Angeles State Normal School in June 1884. She then studied at University of Minnesota, University of California, University of Chicago Law School, in Germany and in Paris. In Paris she was the only woman in a class of 60 students. She was granted a doctorate with high honors, Ph.D., from the Sorbonne, Paris, in 1904.

== Career ==
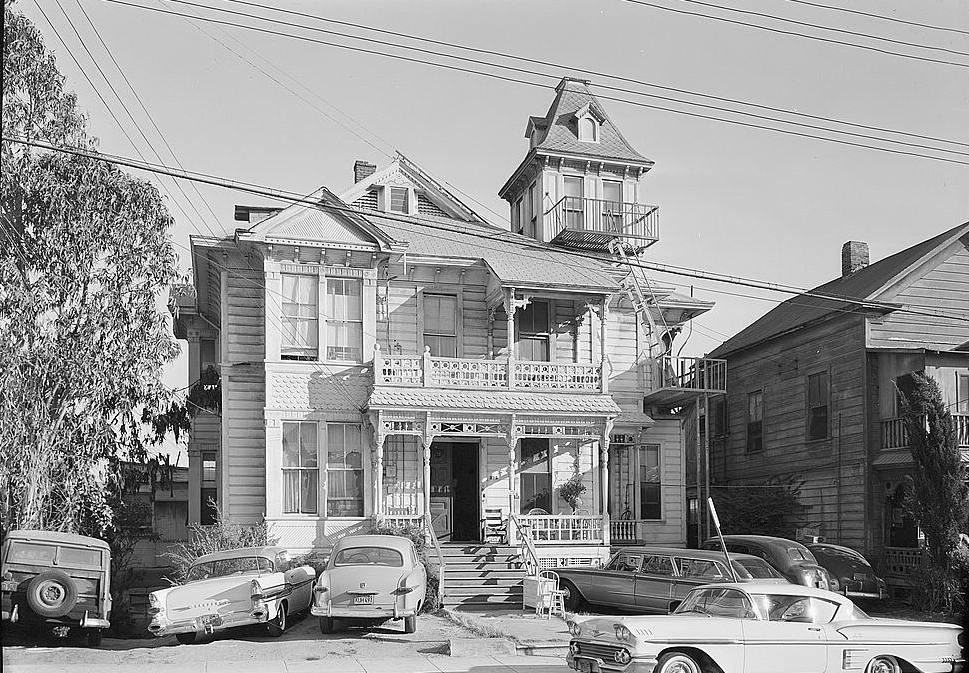
Brousseau Mansion, Historic American Buildings Survey, 1960

Around 1882, Kate Brousseau started her teaching career giving private French lessons at her family home, the Brousseau Mansion, built around 1878 by her father, at 238 South Bunker Hill Avenue, Los Angeles. The house appears in the movie The Money Trap (MGM, 1966) and also briefly in Bus Stop (1956) (across the street from Marilyn Monroe's boarding house) and it was demolished shortly after The Money Trap was filmed there.

In 1891, Brosseau taught French at the Los Angeles State Normal School and also translated French literature for the Los Angeles Times. From 1897 to 1903 Brousseau was on the faculty at the Los Angeles State Normal School teaching mathematics and psychology. From 1907 to 1928 she was professor of psychology and in the end chair of the Psychology Department at Mills College, Oakland.

Brousseau made a psychological survey of the inmates of Sonoma State Home for the Feebleminded (later Sonoma Developmental Center) in 1914 and 1915, giving tests to about 1400 disabled children and was director of the psychological services at the Institute of Family Relations in Los Angeles. In 1937, Brousseau wrote Psychological service at the Los Angeles Institute of Family Relations.

Brousseau served in the French Army in World War I from 1917 to 1919, as "directrice des Foyers du Soldat" (director of a soldiers' home), stationed on Lorraine Front; she was with the French Army of Occupation in Germany and in devastated districts of Northern France.

At the end of the war Brosseau helped to rehabilitate traumatized soldiers and was assistant to surgeon Dr. E. Toulouse in examining street railway employees.

Brousseau was awarded the Medaille Commemorative Francaise de la Grand Guerre by the French Government in 1920.

Brousseau is the author of L'éducation des nègres aux États-Unis (1904) and Mongolism: A Study of the Physical and Mental Characteristics of Mongolian Imbeciles (1928). In "Mongolism" Brousseau argues that a precursor of the Mongolian idiocy was to be found in the "furfuraceous cretin" described by Édouard Séguin in Idiocy and its Treatment by the Physiological Method (1866). The term Mongolism was replaced by the term Down syndrome only later, in 1961, after Clemens Ernst Benda signed a petition on The Lancet journal.

Brousseau was treasurer and director of the Southern California Society of Mental Hygiene.

Brousseau was a member of American Association for the Advancement of Science, American Association of University Professors, American Association of University Women, Women's Overseas Service League, Lique d'Hygiene Mental of Paris, American Psychological Association, Southern California Academy of Criminology, Ecole d'Antropologie-Paris.

== Personal life ==
Kate Brousseau moved with her family to California in 1877, and lived at 2617 Cole St., Oakland, California. At the time of her death she was living with her sister Mabel at 513 North Beechwood Drive, Los Angeles.

During World War I, Brosseau supported Edith Wharton in her war-reliefs projects; a letter from August 7, 1919, from Wharton to Brosseau, thanks Brosseau for sending 100 francs from Mills College, Wharton writes "all the children of Flanders went back to Belgium last month".

Brosseau retired in 1928 and died on July 8, 1938. She is buried at Evergreen Cemetery, Los Angeles.
