= Anna Elizabeth Rude =

American physician

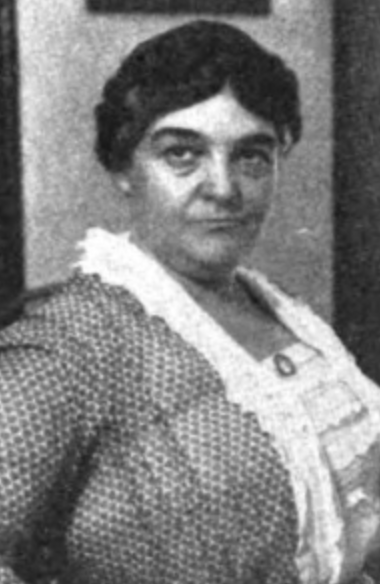
- Anna E. Rude, from a 1919 publication
- Born: September 3, 1876; San Jose, California, U.S.
- Died: June 20, 1960 (age 83); San Francisco, California, U.S.
- Occupations: Physician, suffragist

Anna Elizabeth Rude (September 3, 1876 – June 20, 1960) was an American physician and suffragist, based in California. She was director of the Child Hygiene division of the United States Children's Bureau.

== Early life and education ==
Rude was born in San Jose, California, and was the daughter of Daniel Rude and Amelia Nattinger Rude. Her mother died when Anna was very young; her father, a Civil War veteran from Massachusetts, died in 1887. She graduated from the state normal school (now San Jose State University) in San Jose in 1895, and earned a medical degree at Cooper Medical College (now Stanford University School of Medicine).

== Career ==
Rude served an internship at the Children's Hospital of San Francisco in 1906 and 1907. She worked at Fabiola Hospital in Oakland and taught at Cooper Medical College.

Rude was active in the women's suffrage movement in California. She was treasurer of the College Equal Suffrage League of Northern California beginning in 1911. She attended the Democratic National Convention in 1920 as a representative of the League of Women Voters.

Rude testified at a 1920 Senate hearing on maternal and infant health, and worked for passage of the Sheppard-Towner Act. In the 1920s, Rude was director of the Division of Child Hygiene of the United States Children's Bureau from 1918 to 1924, giving presentations throughout the United States on child health policies and practices; she also answered letters from worried parents. From the late 1920s into the 1940s, she was director of the Bureau of Maternal and Child Hygiene in the Los Angeles County Health Department. In 1930, she became chair of the health committee of the California Conference of Social Work.

== Publications ==
While Rude was at the Children's Bureau, she wrote articles for the American Journal of Public Health and JAMA.

- "The Children's Year Campaign" (1919)
- "Status of State Bureaus of Child Hygiene" (1920)
- "The Sheppard-Towner Act in Relation to Public Health" (1922)
- "The Midwife Problem in the United States" (1923)

== Personal life ==
Rude died in 1960, in her eighties, in San Francisco.
