= Naomi Anderson =

African American suffragist and civil rights activist

Naomi Bowman Talbert Anderson
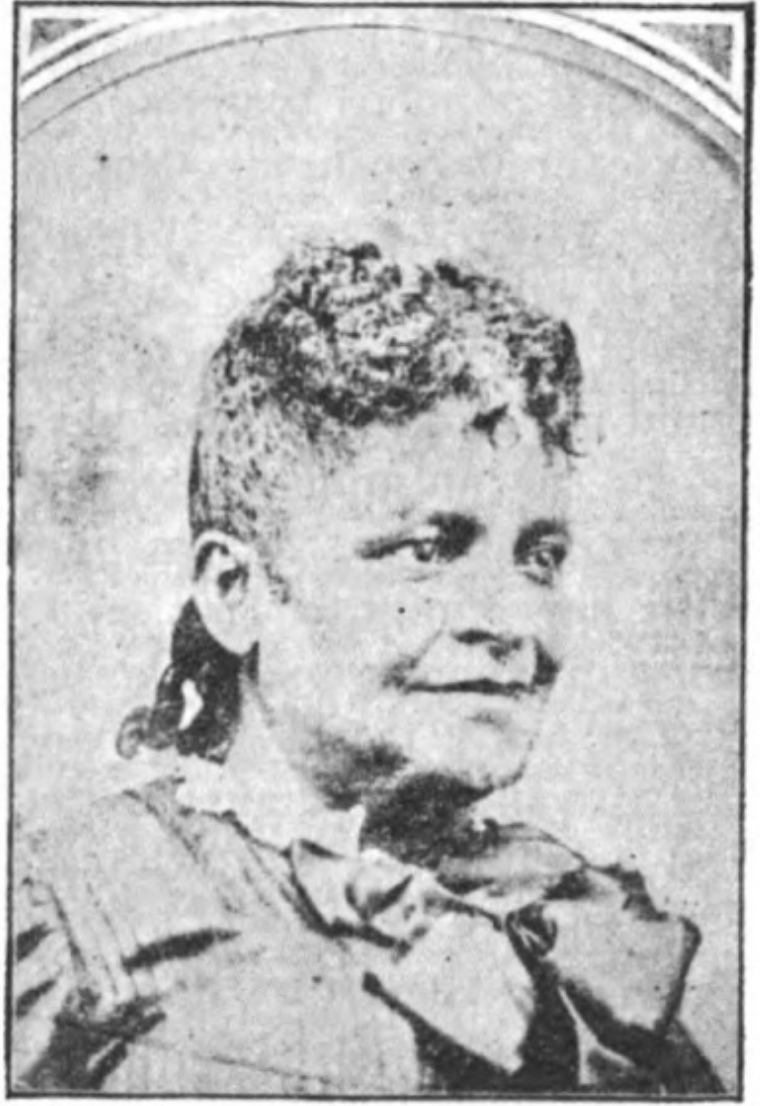
- Born: Naomi Bowman; March 1, 1843; Michigan City, Indiana, U.S.
- Died: June 9, 1899 (aged 56)
- Occupations: Suffragist; civil rights activist; temperance leader

Naomi Bowman Talbert Anderson (March 1, 1843 – June 9, 1899) was an African American suffragist, temperance leader, civil rights activist, and writer who advocated for equal rights for all genders and races in the 1870s. She wrote poetry and gave speeches highlighting the experience of African American women who were still enslaved by their inability to vote, receiving considerable praise from other suffragists for her contributions to the movement.

== Early life and education ==
Anderson was born to free black parents, Elijah and Guilly Ann Bowman, in Michigan City, Indiana. The Bowmans were one of two black families in Michigan City where Anderson was barred from the segregated Indiana Public Schools. Her mother hired her a private tutor where she developed her writing skills. When the Michigan City white community noticed her talent in poetry, she was admitted to a previously all-white school at age 12. Her mother died in 1860, and Anderson's father did not place the same emphasis on education, keeping her from attending college.

== Married life and family ==
Naomi was married at age twenty to William Talbert, a barber from Valparaiso, Indiana. She returned to Michigan City less than two months after her marriage to bury her only sister. It was here that she also buried her first son. Her brother had died prior to this serving in Jacksonville, Florida in the Union Army.

In 1868 she moved with her husband, son, and father to Chicago, where she began her activism. Shortly after a lecturing tour she moved with her family to Dayton, Ohio. She then lived in Cincinnati, Ohio, and after her husband's health failed, learned the hair-dressing trade and moved with her family to Portsmouth, Ohio. There, she worked to support her family and organized a children's home. She managed the home for four months, but left the work due to low pay and family responsibilities. She passed the board of examiners and was employed as a teacher at the time of her husband's death in 1877.

She moved again in 1879 to Columbus, Ohio and built up her hair-dressing business. She married her second husband, Lewis Anderson, in 1881, and they retired to a farm near Columbus. Subsequently, she moved to Wichita Kansas in 1884, where her husband was a successful banker.

== Women's suffrage and advocacy ==
Naomi volunteered with the International Organization of Grand Templars in Chicago and later the Women's Christian Temperance Union to promote temperance. Soon, she began speaking about women's suffrage, beginning at the first Woman's Rights Convention in 1869. She made a lecturing tour in 1869 through southern Illinois, Indiana, and Ohio. From 1869 through the 1870s, she wrote articles on women, Christianity, and temperance for newspapers including the Chicago Tribune and the Dayton Journal. She wrote a poem for the United States Centennial in 1876. This work reflected her Christian faith, thankfulness to the leaders who led the abolition of slavery, and hope that African Americans would serve their nation, pursue educational opportunities, and "bring our latent talents up / On level with mankind."

Upon moving to Wichita with her second husband, she was "known as a lecturer, poetess, and an advocate of Women's Rights." She also found that the white women who had organized a children's home would not admit children of color, so Anderson gathered a council of women of color and organized a "home of their own."

When Anderson lived in San Francisco in the 1890s, she worked alongside white suffragists to campaign for one of the nation's first state woman suffrage referendums. Activists Susan B. Anthony and Elizabeth Cady Stanton both praised her contributions to the movement. Anderson's rhetoric spoke to previously enslaved men and asked them to acknowledge that African American women would continue to be enslaved until they received the right to vote.
