= 1911 California Proposition 4 =

Referendum granting women the right to vote

- October 10, 1911

Results
Choice	Votes	%
Yes	125,037	50.73%
No	121,450	49.27%
County results
Yes
70–80%
60–70%
50–60%
No
60–70%
50–60%

Proposition 4 of 1911 (or Senate Constitutional Amendment No. 8) was an amendment of the Constitution of California that granted women the right to vote in the state for the first time. Senate Constitutional Amendment No. 8 was sponsored by Republican State Senator Charles W. Bell from Pasadena, California. It was adopted by the California State Legislature and approved by voters in a referendum held as part of a special election on October 10, 1911.

An earlier attempt to enfranchise women had been rejected by California voters in 1896, but in 1911 California became the sixth U.S. state to adopt the reform. Nine years later in 1920, women's suffrage was constitutionally recognized at the federal level by the Nineteenth Amendment to the U.S. Constitution. This amendment prohibited both the federal government and all of the states from denying women the right to vote.

== Background ==
=== 1896 rejection of women’s suffrage by California voters ===
During the November 3, 1896 General Election, California voters rejected Constitutional Amendment No. 6 which would have given women the right to vote. The suffrage amendment was defeated by a double-digit margin with 44.6 percent support. Notable counties voting against giving women the right to vote included San Francisco County (26.1% support), San Mateo County (29.9% support), Marin County (30.8% support), Contra Costa County (37.7% support), Sacramento County (40.0% support), Sonoma County (40.4% support), Alameda County (40.7% support), and Santa Clara County (49.0% support).

Both the Los Angeles Times and the San Francisco Chronicle opposed Constitutional Amendment No. 6 which would have given women the right to vote.

== 1911 Proposition 4 election ==
=== Editorials and opinion pieces against women’s suffrage ===
In 1911, there were several editorials and opinion pieces published by the Los Angeles Times against women’s suffrage, including Proposition 4.

A Los Angeles Times editorial dated January 21, 1911, stated that “women are incapable of physically dominating men. By their inferior physical strength they are unable to compete on an equal basis in any line of endeavor where ability is determined by sheer bodily prowess. All positions of physical power - such as in our police forces, our armies and our navies - will necessarily be filled by men. In other words the enforcement of all law must inevitably rest with men. No law or ordinance could be effectually upheld except through the willingness of men to uphold it. And no matter what words were written on the statute books of any State, if the physical power (which is the masculine power) behind it were withdrawn, the law would immediately become void and impotent. Therefore in equal suffrage we have the spectacle of women desiring to pass laws which they are physically incapable of upholding, and laws which they admit the men do not want.”

A Los Angeles Times editorial dated August 19, 1911, stated that: “Possession of the ballot will not help woman, socially or industrially. It will make exactions upon her time and strength. It will invade the home and destroy its charm. It will not result in wiser laws or better government.”

A Los Angeles Times editorial dated September 22, 1911, stated that: “The working man - whether he be a Republican, a Democrat or a Socialist - who walks along Broadway or Spring Street on Saturday afternoon and sees thousands of fashionably-attired girls and women of mature age parading in autos and making woman-suffrage speeches says to himself, ‘Are these butterflies to be entrusted with the task of making laws for me?’” The editorial also stated that “[t]he Times opposes woman suffrage because it does not believe in either the justice or the expediency of burdening the women of California with the duty of voting.”

In a Los Angeles Times opinion piece dated October 1, 1911, Democratic State Senator J.B. Sanford, who was Chairman of the Democratic Caucus of California at the time, called women’s suffrage a “disease,” a “political hysteria,” a “cruel and intolerable burden,” and a “backward step in the progress of civilization.” In the same opinion piece published by the Los Angeles Times, Democratic State Senator Sanford also used homophobic language in writing the following about certain classes of people who advocate women’s suffrage: “It is the mannish female politician and the little effeminate, sissy man, and the woman who is dissatisfied with her lot and sorry that she was born a woman.”

=== Ballot arguments ===
The ballot argument in favor of Proposition 4 was written by Republican State Senator C.W. Bell and Republican Assemblyman H.G. Cattell, both from southern California. The ballot argument against Proposition 4 was written by Democratic State Senator J.B. Sanford from northern California.

== Results ==
Proposition 4 was narrowly approved by California voters with 50.7 percent support. Election evening results appeared to indicate that Proposition 4 would be defeated as there was strong opposition from the San Francisco Bay Area. However, late returns from the agricultural and rural parts of the state overcame majority opposition from Bay Area cities such as San Francisco and Oakland.

The county with the highest level of support for Proposition 4 was Modoc County with 70.5% in favor, while the county with the lowest level was San Francisco County, with 38.1% in favor.

The following table details the results by county:

County	Yes		No	
County	#	%	#	%
Alameda	10,627	45.36	12,802	54.64
Alpine	26	61.90	16	38.10
Amador	478	43.18	629	56.82
Butte	1,829	62.96	1,076	37.04
Calaveras	736	60.48	481	39.52
Colusa	438	50.64	427	49.36
Contra Costa	1,569	50.34	1,548	49.66
Del Norte	305	60.64	198	39.36
El Dorado	601	60.71	389	39.29
Fresno	3,192	55.90	2,518	44.10
Glenn	614	62.59	367	37.41
Humboldt	1,815	63.11	1,061	36.89
Imperial	619	66.63	310	33.37
Inyo	400	64.52	220	35.48
Kern	1,760	52.27	1,607	47.73
Kings	708	57.14	531	42.86
Lake	471	58.00	341	42.00
Lassen	339	63.36	196	36.64
Los Angeles	27,391	55.20	22,228	44.80
Madera	578	60.59	376	39.41
Marin	1,102	41.55	1,550	58.45
Mariposa	164	52.06	151	47.94
Mendocino	1,285	50.23	1,273	49.77
Merced	798	66.00	411	34.00
Modoc	423	70.50	177	29.50
Mono	109	57.98	79	42.02
Monterey	1,186	49.92	1,190	50.08
Napa	1,001	54.58	833	45.42
Nevada	869	55.56	695	44.44
Orange	1,787	49.46	1,826	50.54
Placer	1,133	59.98	756	40.02
Plumas	383	62.89	226	37.11
Riverside	1,955	58.87	1,366	41.13
Sacramento	3,220	51.56	3,025	48.44
San Benito	560	58.27	401	41.73
San Bernardino	2,548	53.06	2,254	46.94
San Diego	3,331	57.48	2,464	42.52
San Francisco	21,919	38.08	35,635	61.92
San Joaquin	2,417	54.08	2,052	45.92
San Luis Obispo	1,284	55.51	1,029	44.49
San Mateo	1,187	44.47	1,482	55.53
Santa Barbara	1,396	53.82	1,198	46.18
Santa Clara	4,762	60.42	3,120	39.58
Santa Cruz	1,517	61.89	934	38.11
Shasta	1,170	66.78	582	33.22
Sierra	279	60.52	182	39.48
Siskiyou	1,126	60.05	749	39.95
Solano	1,438	55.52	1,152	44.48
Sonoma	2,461	52.01	2,271	47.99
Stanislaus	1,556	67.01	766	32.99
Sutter	381	57.55	281	42.45
Tehama	781	64.12	437	35.88
Trinity	343	69.57	150	30.43
Tulare	1,935	64.61	1,060	35.39
Tuolumne	561	56.72	428	43.28
Ventura	816	48.80	856	51.20
Yolo	859	55.42	691	44.58
Yuba	499	55.69	397	44.31
Total	125,037	50.73	121,450	49.27

== Progressive Era of Reforms ==
Women's suffrage was a part of the Progressive Era of reforms. On the same election day that Proposition 4 was approved, voters enacted the modern system of direct democracy in California, by approving Proposition 7, which introduced the initiative and the optional referendum powers, and Proposition 8, which introduced the recall of public officials.

=== Constitutional Suffrage Reforms Excluded ===
While Proposition 4 gave women the right to vote in California, the proposition did not alter the existing discriminatory provisions in the California Constitution limiting the right to vote, including prohibiting natives of China from voting, prohibiting the mentally disabled from voting, and prohibiting persons from voting who were unable to read the Constitution in the English language and write their name.

== See also ==
- List of California suffragists
- Timeline of the women's suffrage movement in California
- Women's suffrage in California
- Women's suffrage in the United States
