= Clara Shortridge Foltz =

American lawyer and women's rights activist (1849–1934)

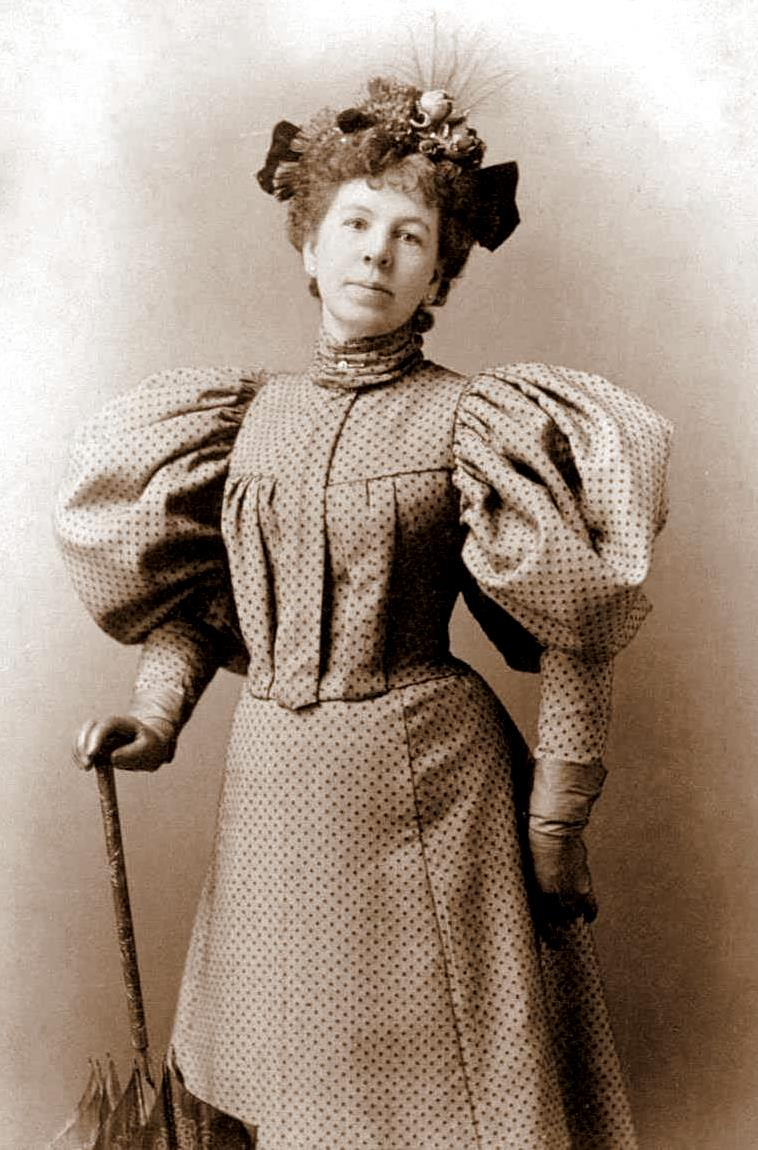
- Foltz, c. 1890-1899
- Born: July 16, 1849; Lafayette, Indiana, U.S.
- Died: September 2, 1934 (aged 85); Los Angeles, California, U.S.
- Resting place: Inglewood Park Cemetery
- Occupations: Attorney, publisher, suffragist
- Known for: First female lawyer admitted to the California State Bar
- Spouse: Jeremiah D. Foltz (m. 1864)
- Relatives: Samuel M. Shortridge (brother); Charles M. Shortridge (brother)

Clara Shortridge Foltz (July 16, 1849 – September 2, 1934) was an American lawyer, the first female lawyer on the West Coast, and the pioneer of the idea of the public defender. The Criminal Courts Building in downtown Los Angeles was renamed after her in 2002, and is now known as the Clara Shortridge Foltz Criminal Justice Center.

== Early life and legal education ==
Foltz was born Clarissa Shortridge in Milton, Indiana, to Talitha and Elias Willetts Shortridge (a lawyer and preacher). Prior to the Civil War, the family moved to Mount Pleasant, Iowa, where Foltz attended a co-educational school (rare at the time). In December 1864, at age 15, she eloped with a farmer and Civil War veteran named Jeremiah D. Foltz, and they began having children. However, he had difficulty supporting his family. The Foltzes moved several times, first to Portland, Oregon, and finally to San Jose, California, in 1872. During these times, she contributed articles to the New Northwest and the San Jose Mercury.

Around 1876, her husband abandoned her and their five children. She began studying law in the office of a local judge, in part through the support of local suffragette Sarah Knox-Goodrich. She also supported herself by giving public lectures, starting in 1877, on suffrage.

== Legal career ==
=== Joining the California bar ===
Foltz wanted to take the bar examination but California law at the time allowed only white males to become members of the bar. Foltz authored a state bill, known as the "Woman Lawyer Bill", which replaced "white male" with "person", and in September 1878 she passed the examination and was the first woman admitted to the California bar, and the first female lawyer on the entire west coast of the United States. Having little formal education, she wished to study at the first law school in California to improve her skills. Alongside her ally Laura de Force Gordon, Foltz applied to Hastings College of the Law but was denied admission because of her sex. Foltz and Gordon sued, but recognized that they faced strong opposition.

To advance their cause, Gordon and Foltz wrote an amendment to the California state constitution that read "No person shall, on account of sex, be disqualified from entering upon or pursuing any lawful business, vocation, or profession." Drawing upon both the Woman Lawyer Bill and the soon-to-be-ratified equal opportunity in employment statement in the constitution, Foltz and Gordon were able to argue that if women could serve as lawyers they must certainly be allowed to attend law school at the coeducational University of California. Chief Justice of California Robert F. Morrison agreed, and in Foltz v. Hoge ruled that Foltz and Gordon should be admitted to Hastings. The ruling was appealed, and Foltz studied for and passed the California State Supreme Court bar exam in order to argue her case, which she ultimately won. Although Foltz successfully obtained admission for all qualified women to Hastings, the work to win the case left Foltz impoverished and she returned to her legal career instead of pursuing her dream of attending law school.

=== Later career ===
Foltz practiced in San Francisco, San Diego, and from 1896 to 1899 in New York, where she attempted to create a career as a corporate attorney. After the 1906 San Francisco earthquake and subsequent fires, Foltz was left without a home or office. She relocated to Los Angeles, where she worked for two more decades.

== Political career ==
=== Public speaking ===
In an era when public speaking could be a lucrative career, Foltz spoke for the Republicans during the campaigns of 1880, 1882, and 1884. In 1886 she became a Democrat, and in the winter of that year lectured in Wisconsin, Illinois, and Iowa.

=== Suffrage ===
Foltz became a leader in the woman's voting rights movement. During a career that spanned 56 years, Foltz almost single-handedly pushed a great deal of progressive legislation for women's rights in the voting and legal fields.

=== Public defense ===
At the Chicago World's Fair in 1893, during a "congress" of the Board of Lady Managers, Foltz made her first highly public presentation of her idea of the public defender. Foltz's then-radical concept of providing assistance to indigent criminal defendants would be used today throughout the United States.

== Other accomplishments ==
Foltz was notable for many "firsts": first female clerk for the State Assembly's Judiciary Committee (1880); the first woman appointed to the State Board of Corrections; one of the first female licensed Notary Public (L.P. Spencer was the first, appointed in 1891); the first woman named director of a major bank; and, in 1930, the first woman to run for Governor of California, at the age of 81.

In 1910, she was appointed to the Los Angeles District Attorney's Office, becoming the first female deputy district attorney in the United States. She was active in the suffrage movement, authoring the Women's Vote Amendment for California in 1911. Foltz also raised five children, mostly as a single mother, and encouraged women not to overlook their traditional domestic roles.

Foltz also founded and published the San Diego Daily Bee, and New American Woman Magazine, for which she wrote a monthly column until her death.

== Family ==
Foltz's brother, Samuel M. Shortridge, was elected to the United States Senate from California in 1920 and served two terms. Foltz supported his campaigns, though earlier she had disagreed with him on key issues such as tariffs.

Their brother Charles M. Shortridge (1857–1918) was the owner of the San Jose newspaper Daily Mercury and purchased The San Francisco Call in 1895.

== Death ==
Foltz died at the age of 85 of heart failure at her home in Los Angeles on September 2, 1934. The pallbearers for her funeral included Governor Frank Merriam and several prominent federal and state judges. She was cremated and interred at Inglewood Park Cemetery in Los Angeles County.

== Posthumous recognition ==
At the insistence of its female students, Hastings College of the Law granted Foltz a posthumous degree of Doctor of Laws in 1991. Additionally, the primary social space inside UC Hastings's McAllister Tower student housing complex was christened the Clara S. Foltz Lounge. In 2002, the Criminal Courts Building in downtown Los Angeles was renamed the Clara Shortridge Foltz Criminal Justice Center.

== See also ==
- List of suffragists and suffragettes
- List of first women lawyers and judges in California

== Bibliography ==
- Sharon Avey, The Lady Lawyer: Clara Shortridge Foltz, 2001, AV Publishers, ISBN 0971739609
- Barbara Allen Babcock, "Women Defenders in the West", University of Nevada Law Journal (Spring 2001).
- Barbara Allen Babcock, "Clara Shortridge Foltz: First Woman", 28 Valparaiso University Law Review 1231 (Summer 1994).
- Barbara Allen Babcock, "She Blazed the Trail: Clara Foltz Opened a Major Door for Women in 1878, When She Became the First Female Member of the State Bar", 106 The Los Angeles Daily Journal S16 (October 7, 1993).
- Barbara Allen Babcock, "Western Women Lawyers", 45 Stanford Law Review 2179 (1993).
- Barbara Allen Babcock, "Clara Shortridge Foltz: Constitution-maker", 66 Indiana Law Journal 849 (1991).
- Barbara Allen Babcock, "Reconstructing the Person: The Case of Clara Shortridge Foltz", 12 Biography 1 (1989).
- "Clara Foltz, San Francisco", 1 The Law Student's Helper 263 (October 1893).
- Harris, Gloria G.; Hannah S. Cohen (2012). "Chapter 3. Suffragists – Clara Shortridge Foltz: Portia of the Pacific". Women Trailblazers of California: Pioneers to the Present. Charleston, SC: The History Press. pp. 43–59 [55–59]. ISBN 978-1609496753.

Attribution:
