= Pacific Coast Women's Press Association =

Historic American press organization for women

- Abbreviation: PCWPA
- Formation: September 27, 1890
- Founder: Emelie Tracy Y. Swett
- Dissolved: 1941
- Headquarters: San Francisco, California
- President: Nellie Blessing Eyster; Emily Browne Powell; Mrs. I. Lowenberg; Hester A. Benedict; Abbie E. Krebs
- Main organ: The Impress

Pacific Coast Women's Press Association (PCWPA; September 27, 1890 - 1941) was a press organization for women located on the West Coast of the United States. Discussions were not permitted regarding politics, religion, or reform. The members of the association took on causes related to certain public improvements in the way of roads, streets, parks, libraries, village improvement societies, free exhibits of county resources, the suppression of criminal details of sensational cases in newspapers, the suppression of criminal advertising, and school development. To facilitate the work, the association issued printed monographs.

== Establishment ==
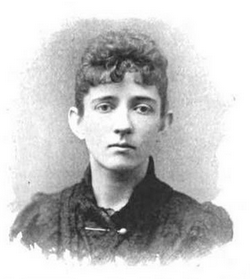
Emelie Tracy Y. Swett

Until 1890, working newspaper women and women authors located along the U.S. Pacific coast lacked protection, benefit and advantages associated with unity. In other parts of the United States, these associations had been established since 1880, most of the earlier ones being organized for purely social purposes.

After nearly three years of planning, 150 invitations were sent out to newspaper women and authors in good standing on the Pacific coast, asking them to meet in San Francisco, California on September 27, 1890, at the home of Emelie Tracy Y. Swett. Fifty women came to the meeting, but everyone invited sent letters of encouragement and pledged herself to support the movement.

== History ==
A Constitution and By-Laws of the New England Woman's Press Association were adopted. The primary purpose of the PCWPA was to improve the women's relationships through the frequent interchange of ideas and methods.

The first year was spent in active organization. A library of several hundred books was accumulated and catalogued, and at the close of the year, the Association numbered 125 active members.

The members took on causes related to public improvements in the way of roads, streets, parks, libraries, village improvement societies, free exhibits of county resources, the suppression of criminal details of sensational cases in newspapers, the suppression of criminal advertising, and the development of kindergartens. To facilitate their work, the Association issued printed monographs. The first monograph issued was on the topic of "Country Roads and City Streets", written by Mary Lynde Hoffman, a large property owner. More than 500 notices were sent to the Association concerning this essay alone.

In its first three years, the only source of income of the Association was through membership and initiation fees and from contributions. In time, the association hoped to erect a building in San Francisco, the rentals of which would suffice to pay the running expenses of the Association, as well as sick benefits, when required.

More than 500 volumes were contributed to the Association's library, besides files of many of the leading dailies, weeklies, monthlies. The Association wanted first to accumulate complete sets of the published works of members, then works by Pacific coast writers, then reference books, and finally, rare and standard books. The organization's librarian was a member of the American Library Association.

The writing of the general newspaper worker was for the most part anonymous in that era. Therefore, the Association did not feel that its ranks were at a disadvantage when compared with those of other press associations. the PCWPA's members was so scattered over a large territory, that it was unable to show many influential Western newspaper connections. On the other hand, the Western style of reporting had become popular, with nearly all of the writers retaining from one to six connections with influential Eastern and British periodicals. As a member of the General Federation of Women's Clubs, the International League of Press Clubs and the Woman's National Press Association, the PCWPA was abreast with the spirit of organization, at the same time confident that responsible individualism was its strength.

The organization was discontinued after 1941.

== Executive Boards ==
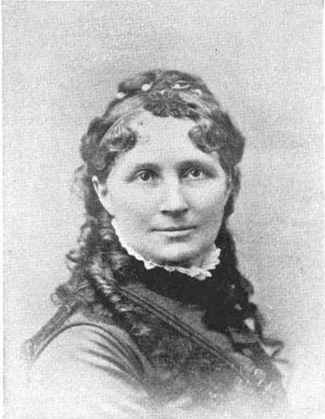
Nellie Blessing Eyster

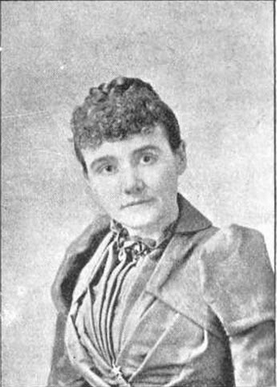
Emily Browne Powell

Emelie Swett Parkhurst founded the Association in 1890. Nellie Blessing Eyster was unanimously elected as the first president. The original executive board included Jeanne C. Smith Carr of Pasadena, California, First Vice-president; Sarah Brown Ingersoll Cooper, Second Vice-president; Ella Rhoads Higginson of Whatcom, Washington, Third Vice-president; Parkhurst, Corresponding Secretary; Nellie Verrill Mighels Davis of Carson City, Nevada, Recording Secretary; Mary Olmstead Stanton, Treasurer; Isabel H. Raymond of Santa Cruz, California Auditor; and a supplementary committee consisting of Mary Camilla Foster Hall-Wood of Santa Barbara, Frances Bagby-Blades of San Diego and Andrea Hofer of Chicago.

In 1892, Emily Browne Powell succeeded Eyster was as the organization's second president. The Executive Officers for that year, in addition to Powell, included Cooper, First Vice-president; Charlotte Perkins Stetson Gilman, Second Vice-president; Mrs. James Neall, Third Vice-president; Minna V. Gaden, Corresponding Secretary; Mary Lambert, Recording Secretary; Ella M. Sexton, Assistant Recording Secretary; Florence Percy Matheson, Treasurer; Adeline Knapp, Chairman of Program Committee additional; members, Agnes Manning and Lillian Plunkett.

== Notable people ==
Active members in the first year included Caroline Severance, the first president of the first woman's club in Boston; Eliza D. Keith of the San Francisco News Letter; Carrie Stevens Walter, associate owner and editor of the San Josean; Rosa Smith Eigenmann, then of the San Francisco Academy of Sciences; Mary G. Charlton Edholm of the Oakland Tribune and WCTU; Mary Bourne Watson of the Morning Call of San Francisco; Virginia Hilliard of the San Francisco Argus; Mattie P. Owen, editor of the Golden Way; Mary Lambert of the Oakland Enquirer; Mary C. Bowman, associate editor and owner of the Santa Paula Chronicle; Emeline North, trade and shipping correspondent to Saint Petersburg, Russia and Kyiv, Ukraine papers; Mary Lynde Hoffman, author of several treatises on road and street construction; Anna C. Murphy, Evelyn Ludlum, Mary Viola Lawrence (Riding Hood), Sarah Sanford, Carrie Blake Morgan, Julia P. Churchill, and Jane Martin.

There was also Isabel Raymond of the Santa Cruz Surf. Of literary distinction was Josephine White Bates (d. 1934). Among the members of the Association engaged in editorial work were Genevieve Lucile Browne of the Californian, Louise E. Francis, editor of the Castroville Enterprise, Maggie Downing Brainard of the Pacific Tree and Vine, San Jose, California and Mrs. L. C. P. Haskins of Washington. Among those members who were regular contributors to Eastern and local journals, writing upon California subjects, were a number of Pacific Coast writers by adoption. Helen Gregory-Flesher, a regular contributor to the American Press Association, to the local press, to New York magazines and an occasional contributor to the Arena, was a Canadian by birth and education. Mary F. McRoberts, an Englishwoman, well known in political and educational circles in England, and a contributor to its press from California, was another newcomer to the Pacific Coast, though a resident of California in earlier times. Emma Russell Endres, another English woman, and correspondent to the London Times, was a Californian by her adoption of the State as her home, and a busy contributor to the English and American press. Other members whose largest contribution to the press was for Eastern publications were Carrie Wake Morgan, Alice Cary Waterman, Clara Spalding Brown, and Dorothea Lummis. Madge Morris Wagner, born on the Great Plains when her parents were en route to California, was a poet and journalist associated with The Golden Era.

Among those of national prominence were Jessie Benton Fremont, an author who was instrumental in bringing California into the Union as a free State. Grace Hibbard, a California poet, was the author of California Violets. Rose Hartwick Thorpe, author of Curfew Must Not Ring Tonight, had a note from Queen Victoria telling her that she had committed that poem to memory. Anna M. Morrison Reed, editor of the Northern Crown, was a constant contributor to literature, both prose and poetry. There was also the author, Lillian Hinman Shuey, and the poet, Mary Cameron Benjamin.

Kate Douglas Wiggin was well known as a kindergarten worker and author. Virna Woods gained her first literary reputation in the field of descriptive verse. Jeanne C. Smith Carr (initial First Vice-president of the PCWPA Executive Board), was a constant writer for the general press, well known in Southern California. Mary Catherine McIntire Pacheco, a Kentucky playwright, was one of California's first published women authors.

There were a few novelists such as Alice Kingsbury Cooley, Gertrude Athertonn, and Mrs. I. Lowenberg, who was also a past President of the PCWPA. There were the writers, Frances Fuller Victor and Charlotte Perkins Stetson Gilman (past PCWPA Executive Board member), as well as the social reformer, Mrs. M. G. C. Edholmes, and the botanist, Sara Plummer Lemmon. Helena Modjeska, whose summer home was near Santa Ana, California, was made an honorary member. Emily Brown Powell (past PCWPA president), contributed to the Tribune, The San Francisco Call, and many other periodicals. Alice Moore McComas of Los Angeles and her daughter Alice's contributions appeared in several of the best journals. Lizzie A. Vore wrote continually for the general press and was a well known contributor to the prominent magazines of the day. Mary E. Hart (1856–1921), owner and editor of the Pacific Monthly, became a resident of Alaska, and had charge of the Alaska exhibit at the St. Louis Fair; she was a frequent contributor to the press. Anna Catherine Murphy Markham wrote short stories for the Overland Monthly, Yankee Blade, and other magazines. Ada Henry Van Pelt and Clare O. Southard each served as editors of the Pacific Ensign. Josephine Clifford McCracken, author of Overland Tales, was one of the early editors of the Overland Monthly. Florence Percy Matheson McIntyre, for many years one of the editors of The San Francisco Call, was a constant contributor to the California press; she also served as the PCWPA's treasurer and later, President. Miriam Kerns Weekes was a painter and illustrator of note. Dr. A. M. Beecher was a writer and lecturer, and a member of the famous Beecher family. Rose O'Halloran was a scientific writer of the Pacific coast. She was one of the most distinguished women in astronomy and science, and was an authority on sun spots.

Other women who were doing important literary work included: Mrs. S. L. Darling, Emily S. Loud, Mary V. T. Lawrence, Florence Hardeman Miller, Laura Young Pinney, Mrs. Ella M. Sexton, Mrs. Emma Seckle Marshall, Mrs. Virginia S. Hilliard, Rose L. Bushnell Donnelly, Amelia Truesdell, Willina Knight Stringer, Dr. Minora Kibbe, Ruth Comfort Mitchell, Lydia H. Morrow, Mrs. James Neall, Elizabeth Murray Newman, Laura Lyon White, S. M. Farnham, Mary Fairbrother, Julia P. Foster, Sophie Gardiner, Augusta Friedrich Von Eichen, E. Or. Lightner, De Neal Morgan, artist and illustrator, Mary Tracy Mott, Emeline M. North Whitcomb, Laura Bride Powers, of the San Francisco Call; Kate Elliott, Mrs. N. H. Martin, and Miss Martin McKim.

Mrs. P. T. Dickinson (Hester A. Benedict) was a poet and past President PCWPA. Abbie E. Krebs (past President PCWPA) had been a newspaper writer, and for some years edited the column of the San Francisco Chronicle. Sara E. Reamer was the first librarian and historian of the Association. Her early life in California was spent among the mines, during which she was a frequent contributor to the press on subjects of general interest.

== The Impress ==
"The Impress," originally The Bulletin, was a monthly paper and the organ of the PCWPA, was founded October 6, 1893 and published weekly. Charlotte Perkins Stetson, was the editor, Helen Stuart Campbell was the associate. Paul Tyner was the publisher. It was designed to present, from week to week, in crisp, critical paragraphs, the world's news from the Pacific coast standpoint. Questions of the day were discussed occasionally. Reviews of current literature, dramatic, artistic and musical criticism, and articles on art and education, with poetry, fiction, and humor, were among the features of the journal. While not exclusively a woman's paper, The Impress fully recognized the importance of the great movement of the century, and gave it space and attention. The PCWPA retained a page. The Women's Congress Association was also represented, as well as the Parliament of Women of Southern California, and other similar organizations. The Impress was valued as a home paper. "The Art of Living" was an important department of the journal conducted by Campbell.

== Gallery ==
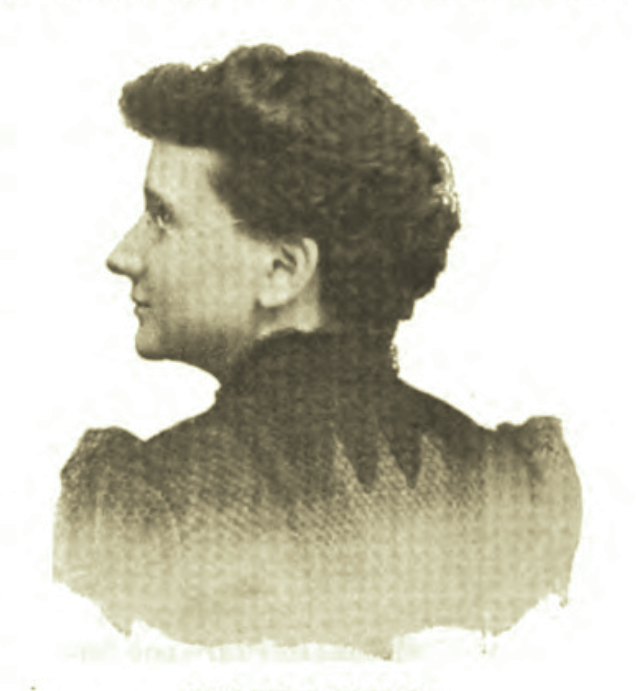
Adeline Knapp

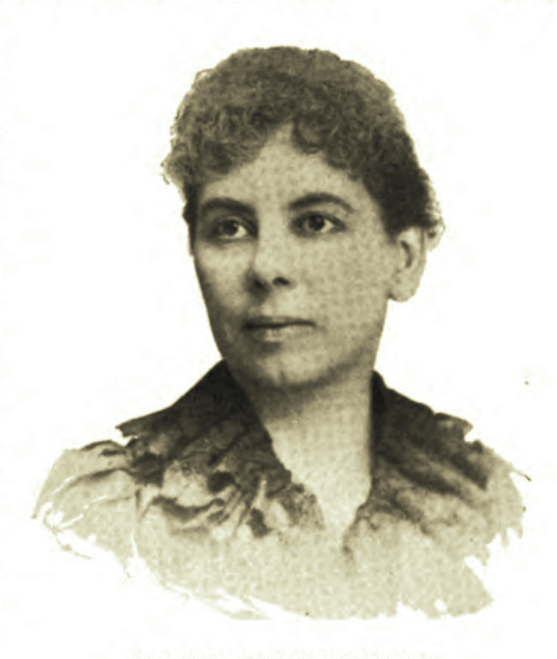
Florence Percy Matheson

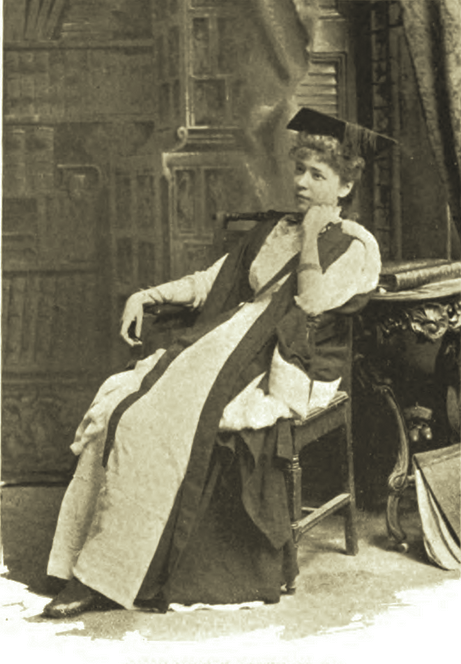
Helen Gregory Flesher

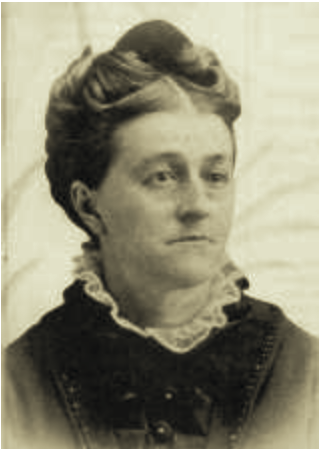
Jeanne C. Smith Carr

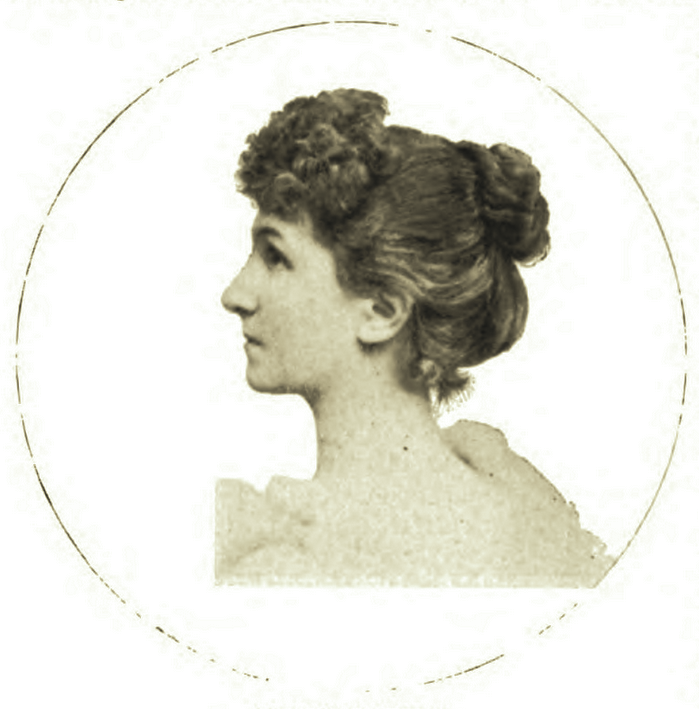
Lillian Plunkett

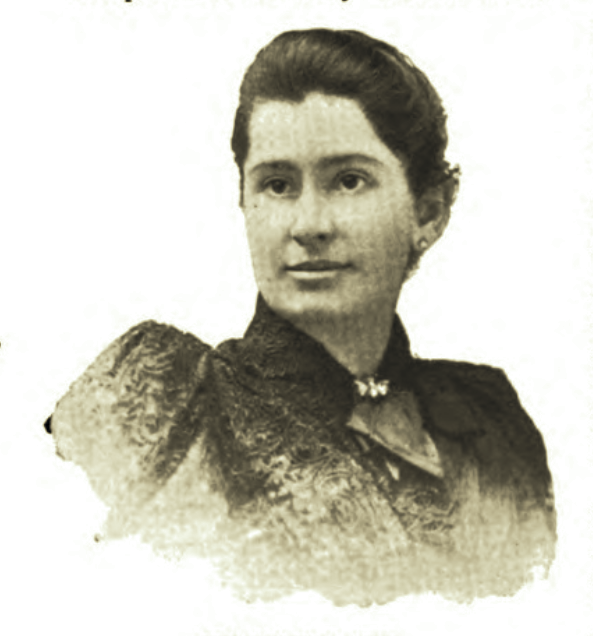
Lindon W. Bates

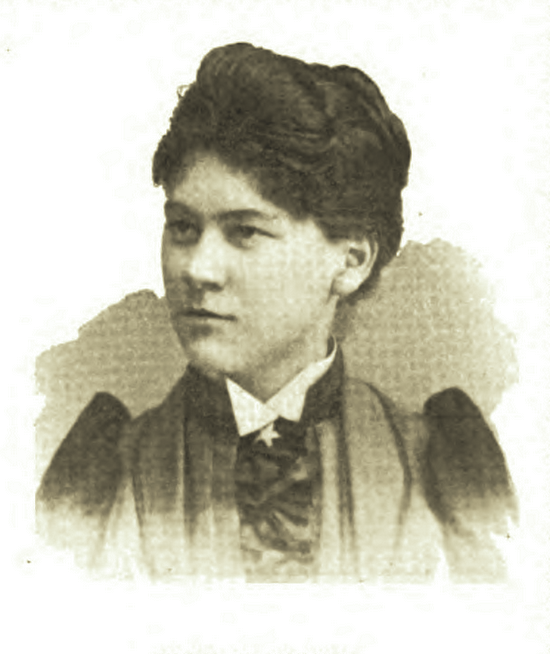
Louise E. Francis

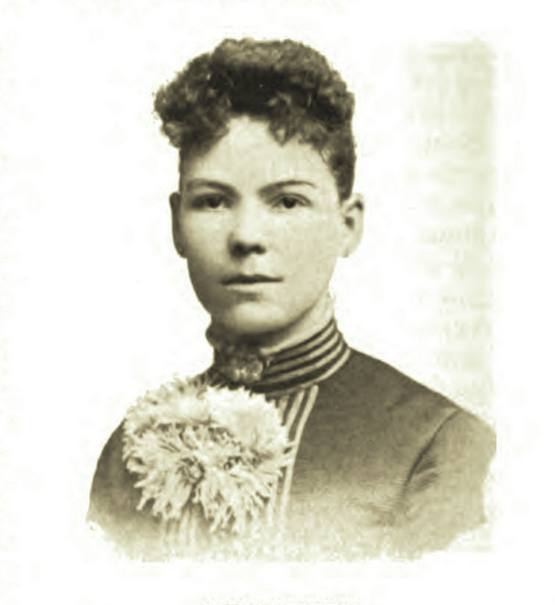
Mary Lambert

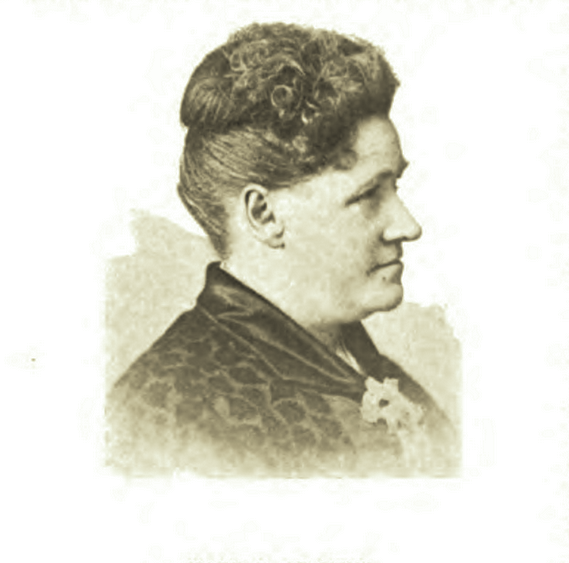
Mary Olmstead Stanton

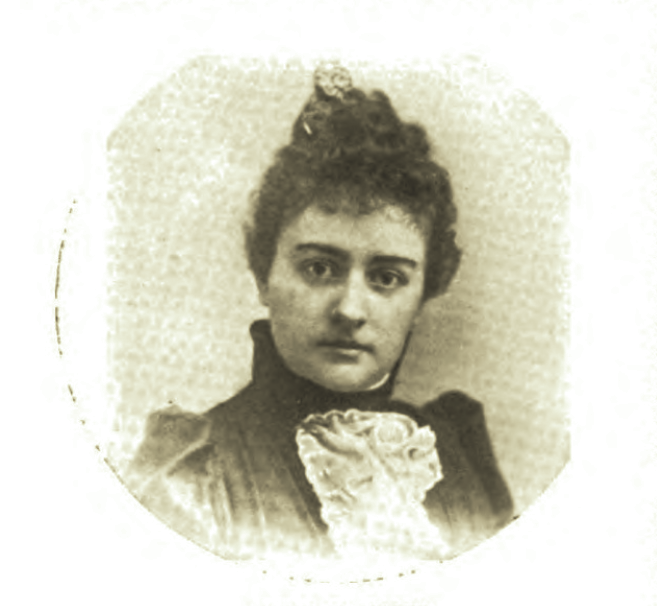
Minna V. Gaden

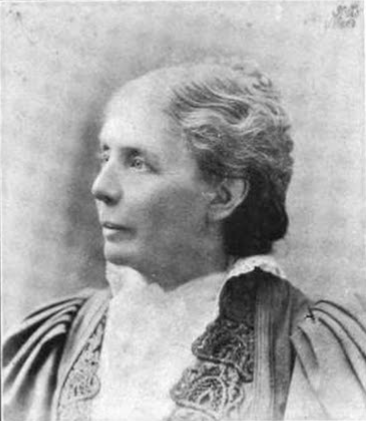
Ada Henry Van Pelt

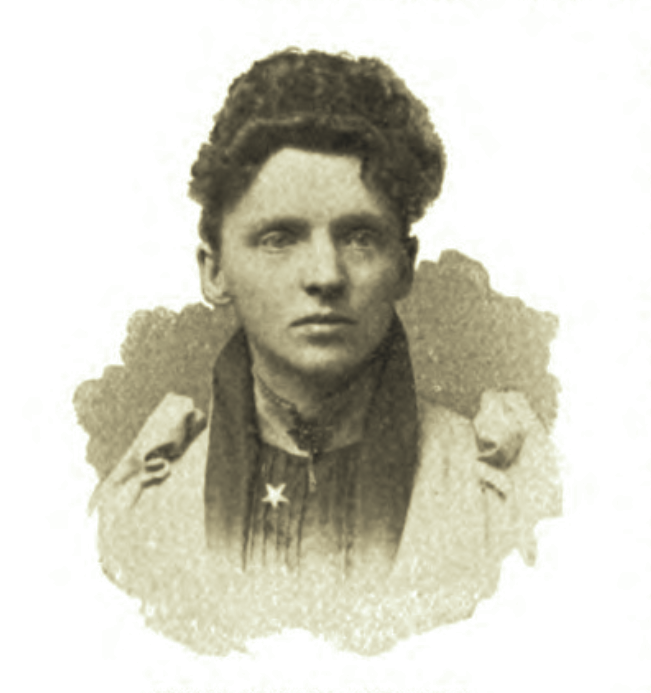
Susan Taylor D'Evelyn

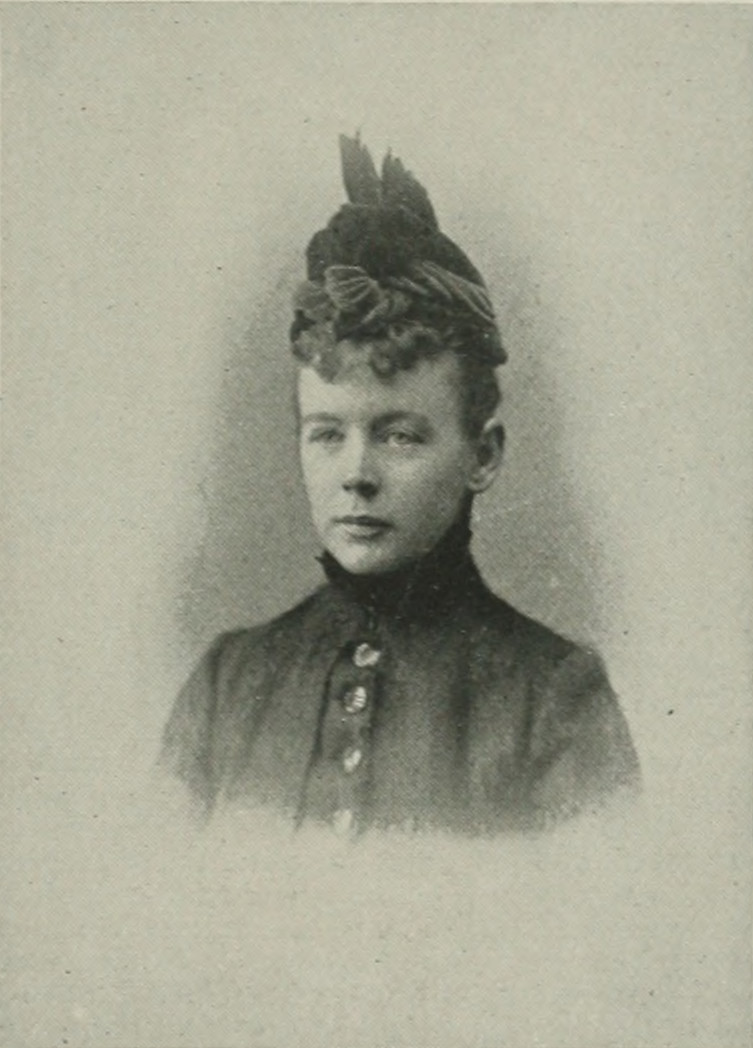
Genie Clark Pomeroy
