= Carrie Carlton =

American writer and poet (ca. 1834 - 1868)

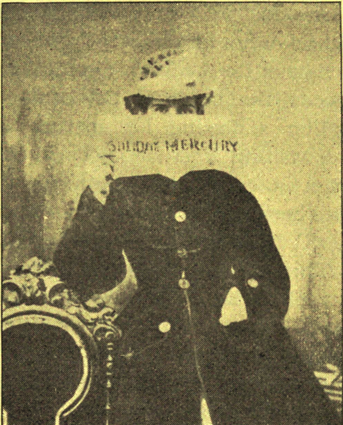
- From an 1893 publication.
- Born: Mary Elizabeth House ca. 1834; Fayette, Missouri, U.S.
- Died: June 1, 1868; San Jose, California, U.S.
- Resting place: Lone Mountain Masonic Cemetery, San Francisco, California, U.S.
- Occupations: writer; poet; journalist
- Spouses: Charles C. Chamberlain (m. 1854–1863); Washington Wright (m. 1865–1866)
- Children: 3
- Writing career
- Pen name: Carrie Carlton; Topsy-Turvey
- Genres: poetry; children's literature; humor; non-fiction
- Notable work: "When I am Dead"

Elizabeth Chamberlain Wright (née Mary Elizabeth House; after first marriage, Mrs. Charles C. Chamberlain and Mrs. M. H. Chamberlain; after second marriage, Mrs. Washington Wright; ca. 1834 – 1868) was a 19th-century American poet and writer known in the press by her pen names, Carrie Carlton and Topsy-Turvey (or Topsey Turvey). She was one of the first Californian women who attempted to live by journalism. As the best known female humorist in her day, her style was compared to Alonzo Delano. Characterized as rather "saucy, piquant and cute", it was also similar to that of Minnie Myrtle Miller and Alice Kingsbury.

== Early life ==
Mary Elizabeth (nickname, "Lizzie") House was born at Fayette, Missouri, about the year 1834. Her father was Rev. Isaac House. Her grandfather was Rev. Elisha House. The family moved from Fayette to New Bedford, Massachusetts where the father, mother, and Florella, the old child, died. Carlton went to live with her grandfather at Paw Paw, Michigan. She soon became almost like a daughter in the family of A. J. Goodrich, who was associated with the House family by marriage. From their home, she moved to Milwaukee, Wisconsin.

== Career ==
=== Wisconsin ===
In Milwaukee, Elizabeth met Charles C. Chamberlain and they married on JunE 8, 1854. Three children were born: Louis C. (b. 1857), Mabel Minnie (b. 1858), and Archie Dean (b. 1862).

In 1862, early in the Civil War era, she published a book of poetry, Wayside Flowers, in Milwaukee, using the pen name "Carrie Carlton", who was identified at the time as being "Mrs. M. H. Chamberlain".

=== California ===
Lon Chamberlain (a brother of Charles), owned a ranch in California, and in 1863, he persuaded Elizabeth and her husband to come to California with him. Elizabeth and the children sailed from New York City for San Francisco, expecting Charles to follow in a few weeks. During his family's voyage, Charles, who was employed in the Milwaukee post office, dropped dead, and just prior to landing at San Francisco, Elizabeth's baby son, Archie Dean, also died.

In San Francisco, on December 9, 1865, she married the journalist, Washington Wright. At an early age, he emigrated with his parents to Cincinnati, where he remained until the Mexican–American War broke out, when he immediately enlisted. When the war was over, he proceeded to Chicago and began publication of the American Citizen. He came to California in 1856, after which time he was connected with the publication of various journals in this state and Nevada. Later, he was connected with the editorial department of the late Evening Tribune, of Mokelumne Hill, California. For some time, he was in poor health and died in a San Francisco County hospital on August 11, 1866, being about 38 years old. His uncle was Governor of New York, Silas Wright.

Widowed again, Elizabeth was forced to support herself and her children. She did so by writing for The Golden Era, as "Carrie Carlton". When J. Macdonough Foard, editor of The Golden Era, left that publication, he established the Sunday Mercury. This journal was specially remembered for Elizabeth's bright letters, who now signed herself as "Topsy Turvy". Someone wrote for her picture, to which she responded: "I send you the enclosed. If you are not satisfied, you will have to continue to see me through the Sunday Mercury." Across her face, she held the paper just under her eyes. It is the only picture of her that survived. The US$5 a week she received from the Sunday Mercury barely sufficed to keep her from poverty, but when extra writing came in to add to the amount, she forgot the necessaries of life and indulged in luxuries. While she sought other kinds of employment, Elizabeth only achieved success at writing, as she lacked an instinct for business.

Elizabeth published at least three books as "Carrie Carlton". Besides her Wayside Flowers, issued in 1862, there was Inglenook, a story of early Californian life for children, which made up the first of four books in the "Stories from Gold Lands series", published in 1868 by A. Roman & Co. The Letter Writer was a humorous view of Californian correspondence, such as a daughter addressing her mother as "Honored Madam," or a miner writing East for goods in a stately manner. It was written in a crisp, unconventional style, with bits of advice in place, such as "You should always write to your grandfather", being one of the axioms. This was her last book.

As "Mrs. Washington Wright", Elizabeth launched a monthly periodical in 1867, Every Day Life, focused on California literature and fashion. It also contained stories suitable for family reading.

She was a contributor to Poetry of the Pacific edited by May Westworth (San Francisco, Pacific Publishing Company, 1867). Her poem, "Tribute to Fremont", was copied largely, and quoted as one of the finest poems of the day. Elizabeth is best known for a poem she wrote shortly before she died, entitled, "When I am Dead".

Elizabeth was sick the last few years of her life, having contracted consumption. The last project of her life was devoted to the amelioration of poor working conditions for women, and, had she not died, Elizabeth would have been the recognized leader of this movement.

== Death and legacy ==
At the end stage of her life, Elizabeth found families to adopt both of her children. She then left San Francisco for San Jose, California. Elizabeth House Chamberlain Wright died in that city on June 1, 1868.

Her ashes were placed in Lone Mountain Masonic Cemetery, San Francisco, where her friends erected a marble shaft and placed upon it this inscription:— "Topsy Turvey." May 1, 1868. Called Home. Aged 32 years."

Elizabeth's daughter, who lived in Northern California, preserved her mother's scattered poems and writings, and possibly among them were some which were published through the press without a name or a claim.

Her poem, "When I am Dead" was read every Memorial Day over her grave at Lone Mountain Masonic Cemetery by the members of the committee who were organized to thwart the efforts of the real estate men to break up the cemeteries in favor of building lots.

== Selected works ==
=== Books ===
- Wayside Flowers (Milwaukee, Strickland & Co., 1862) (text)
- Inglenook: A Story for Children ("Stories from Gold Lands series", A Roman & Company, 1868) (text)
- Carrie Carlton's popular letter-writer: A valuable assistant to those engaged in epistolary correspondence, and peculiarly adapted to the requirements of California (A Roman & Company, 1868)

=== Poems ===
- "When I am Dead" (1868)

=== Lyrics ===
- "Oh, Gentle Hearts" (1866), lyrics by Mrs. Washington Wright; music by George Felix Benkert
