= Emily Browne Powell =

American writer (1847–1938)

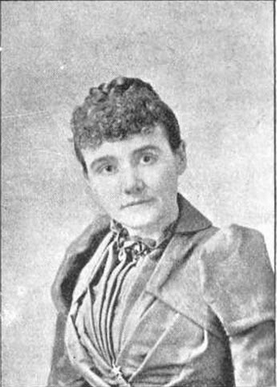
- Powell in an 1893 publication.
- Born: Emily Jeannette Browne; 1847 Waldo County, Maine, U.S.
- Died: September 25, 1938 (aged 90–91) Alameda, California, U.S.
- Occupation: teacher; writer
- Genre: poetry; short stories; essays; letters on the events of the day
- Spouse: J. H. Powell (m. 1872)

Signature
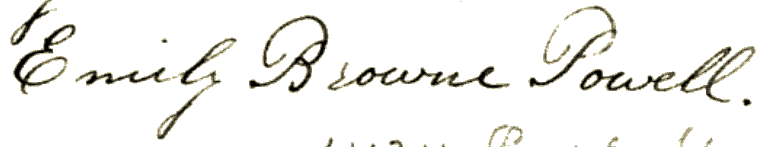

Emily Browne Powell (1847–1938) was an American writer. In 1892, she became the second president of the Pacific Coast Women's Press Association.

== Early life ==
Emily Jeannette Browne was born in 1847, in Waldo County, Maine, of Puritans ancestry. Her parents were Moses M. Browne and Harriet A. (Newell) Browne, and she had a sister, Elizabeth, who married George Emerson Brackett.

Powell wrote her first poem at the age of twelve. At the age of 16, she sent a poem to a Boston literary journal which brought her an invitation to become a regular contributor.

== Career ==
After several years of experience as a teacher in Belfast, Maine and elsewhere, Powell went to California in 1868, where she continued to work as a teacher.

Powell's work consisted of poems, stories, essays, and letters on the events of the day and appeared in many magazines and newspapers, including the Oakland Tribune, The San Francisco Call, Overland Monthly, as well as Harper's Magazine, The Californian, Peterson's Magazine, and New Peterson Magazine. Her poems were widely copied throughout U.S. magazines. She once received complimentary notice from Horace Greeley for a letter written to the New-York Tribune.

The Pacific Coast Women's Press Association was organized in 1890 with about 200 women, and Powell was chosen to be the assistant recording secretary. In September 1892, Powell succeeded Nellie Blessing Eyster to become the organization's second president. She was a charter member of Oakland, California's Tea Club.

== Personal life ==
In 1872, she married James Henry Powell (1847–1925). They had a two daughters, Maude and Marion.

Emily Browne Powell died on September 25, 1938, in Alameda, California, having lived in that city since 1889.

== Selected works ==
=== Books ===
- Songs Along the Way, 1900 (text)

=== In magazines ===
- "A Modern Knight. Reminiscences of Generlal M. G. Vallejo". Harper's Magazine, April 1893
- "In Memoriam--Emelie T. Y. Parkhurst, Poem", The Californian, 1892
- "Song", Peterson's Magazine, vol. 83, June 1883
- "Sweetheart", New Peterson Magazine, vol. 76, July 1879
