= Laura Fair =

American murderer (1837–1919)

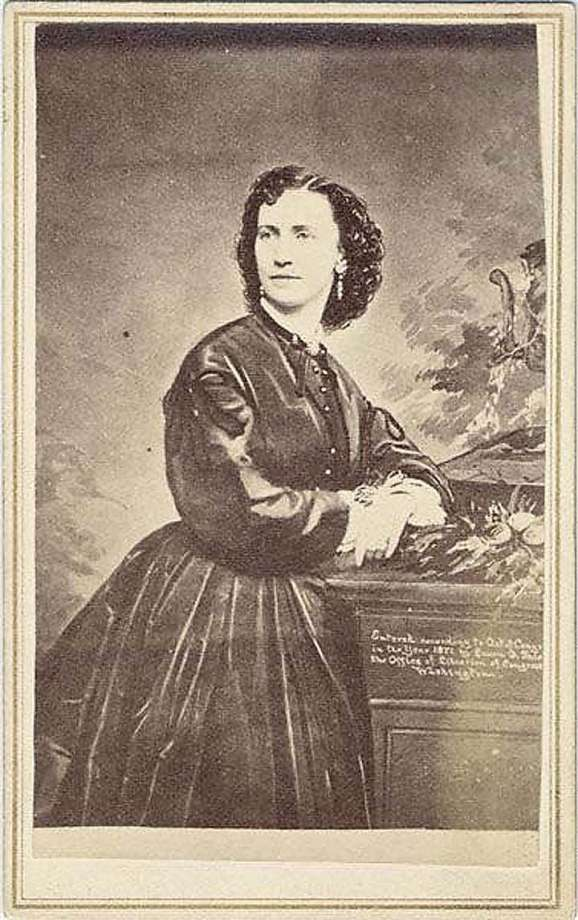
- Born: Laura Ann Hunt; 1837; Holly Springs, Mississippi, U.S.
- Died: 1919 (aged 82); San Francisco, California, U.S.
- Resting place: Woodlawn Memorial Park
- Known for: murdering her lover
- Spouse(s): William Stone (m. 1853–1854; death); Thomas Gracien; William D. Fair (m. 1859–1861; death), Jesse Snyder (m. 1870–1870; divorced)
- Partner: Alexander P. Crittenden
- Children: one

Laura D. Fair (née Laura Ann Hunt; 1837–1919) was an American murderer, whose death sentence was overturned. Her court case is notable due to her gender and the legal case framed around her gender; it received much attention in the press, and support of Fair by the suffragettes.

== Early life and marriages ==
Laura Ann Hunt was born in Holly Springs, Mississippi on June 22, 1837. Her family was small and traveled around the southern United States while she was growing up; eventually settling in New Orleans.

At the age of 16 in 1853, she married her first husband, 36-year-old William H. Stone, an alcohol dealer from New Orleans. He died in 1854. She started school at the Convent of Visitation to become a teacher. Fair left school in a year to marry Thomas Gracien, but shortly abandoned him to join her mother operating a boarding house in San Francisco (around 1856 or 1857).

She met her third husband, sheriff William D. Fair after moving to Shasta, California. Three years later, the couple separated and Fair committed suicide in 1861, leaving Laura to support herself, her young daughter, and her mother. They initially opened a boarding house in Sacramento, but this did not fare well. They then went back to San Francisco, where she worked briefly as an actress.

She was briefly married to Jesse Snyder for a few months in 1870.

== Crittenden and murder ==
In September 1862, Fair opened the 37-room Tahoe House Hotel in Virginia City, Nevada on South C Street, after silver was discovered in the nearby hills.

In 1863, Fair started a relationship with local lawyer Alexander Parker Crittenden, who was already married, although he said he was single and a widower. Fair eventually learned the truth, and Crittenden promised her he would divorce his wife, Clara Churchill Jones. The relationship between Fair and Crittenden had lasted 7 years.

In 1870, Clara Jones took a long train journey to the East Coast of the United States and reunited with her two youngest children. Fair learned that Crittenden was going to meet his wife in Oakland, California and was due to board a ferry back to San Francisco. On November 3, 1870, Fair caught the same ferry and shot Crittenden in the heart.

== Trial ==
In April 1871, Fair faced her first trial where she claimed that the shooting was the result of temporary insanity caused by a severely painful menstrual cycle. Dr. Benjamin Lyford, her personal physician, made the argument that she was unable to control her emotions for biological reasons. The prosecution painted her as a fallen woman who lured Crittenden into bed and warned the jury that they had a moral obligation. While in jail, Susan B. Anthony and Elizabeth Cady Stanton visited Fair to support her. The jury found Fair guilty of murder, and she was sentenced to hang on July 28, 1871.

Fair's case was appealed with the support of suffragettes, including Emily Pitts Stevens, founder of the California Woman Suffrage Association. The conviction was overturned on the grounds of prejudice. The press, having supported the initial conviction, were decidedly upset, calling the acquittal a "shameful miscarriage of justice."

Fair was acquitted in the second trial. She went on to work in San Francisco as a book agent.

== Death ==
Fair died on October 19, 1919, at age 82, in San Francisco. Her body was buried in an unmarked grave in Woodlawn Memorial Park Cemetery.

== In popular culture ==
The case furnished some elements of the story of Laura Hawkins in the novel The Gilded Age: A Tale of Today by Mark Twain and Charles Dudley Warner.

The CBS radio program Crime Classics dramatized the case in an episode entitled "The Incredible Trial Of Laura D. Fair" that aired on August 17, 1953.
