= Emily Pitts Stevens =

American educator, temperance activist and suffragist

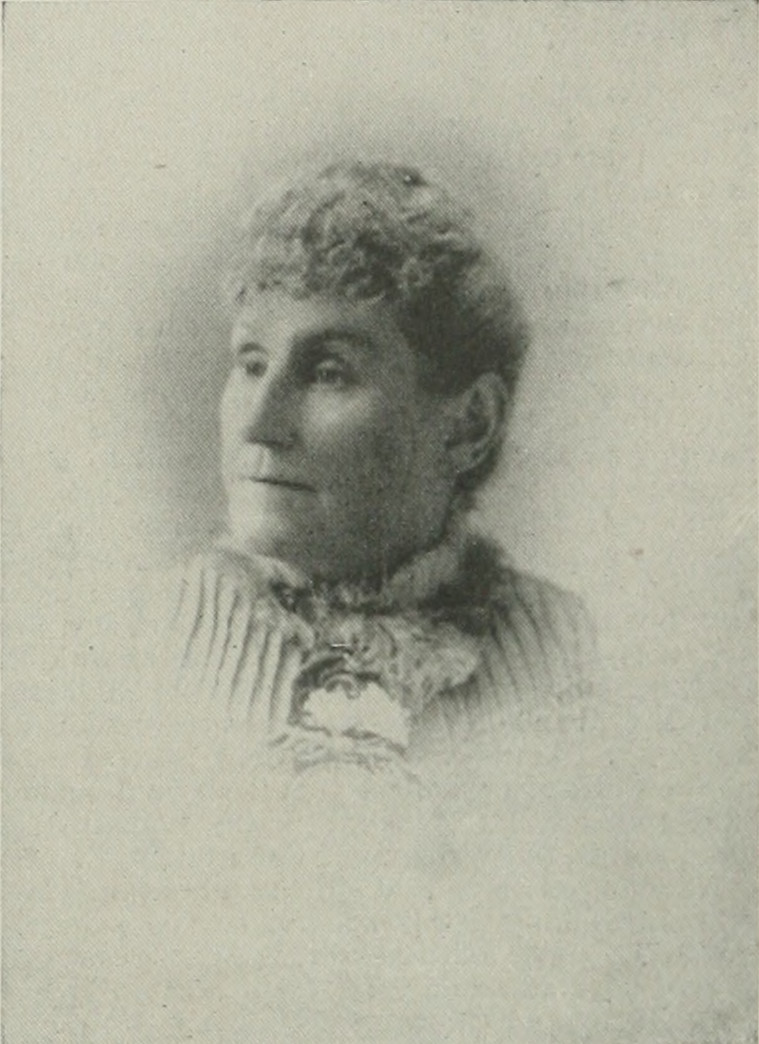
- Photo in A Woman of the Century
- Born: 1841/44; New York, U.S.
- Died: 13 September 1906
- Occupations: Educator, activist, publisher
- Spouse: Augustus A. Stevens
- Writing career
- Language: English
- Literary movement: temperance

Emily Pitts Stevens (Note: According to Levenson (1994), some researchers have misspelled her name as "Pitt" instead of "Pitts". Others have hyphenated her surname as "Pitt-Stevens" or "Pitts-Stevens", though she herself never hyphenated her name.) (née, Pitts; 1841/44 – September 13, 1906) was an American educator, temperance activist, and early San Francisco suffragist. She was the editor and publisher of The Pioneer, the first women’s suffrage journal in the West Coast of the United States, and was a co-founder of the California Woman Suffrage Association. In addition, she was a businesswoman, teacher, administrator, lecturer, and a founder of women's organizations. In San Francisco, Stevens started an evening school for working girls, and instituted the Seaman's League. After the organization of the Woman's Christian Temperance Union (WCTU) in California, she labored on its behalf. She also contributed to the columns of various newspapers, and lectured.

== Early life ==
Emily A. Pitts was born in New York in 1841. (Note: Carter & Gardner (2007) record the year of birth as 1844.)

== Career ==
Stevens removed to San Francisco, in 1865, where she started a popular and successful evening school for working girls, by permission of the superintendent of the city schools. During the first year, the number of students grew to 150.

Stevens purchased the California Sunday Mercury and re-purposed it to be the first written suffrage periodical in the Pacific states. Serving as editor and publisher, she renamed it multiple times, the last being The Pioneer, a woman's paper produced entirely by women, on the basis of equal pay for equal work. This paper sought equal justice for Laura Fair, who was standing trial on a charge of killing her lover.

During the period of 1865 to 1870, she was associated with the all-woman Women’s Cooperative Printing Union, and was the founder of the Woman’s Publishing Company. She was aided by prominent men in placing the stock of the company, and through it, she exercised great influence in advancing the cause of woman in California. Ill-health forced her to suspend the paper.

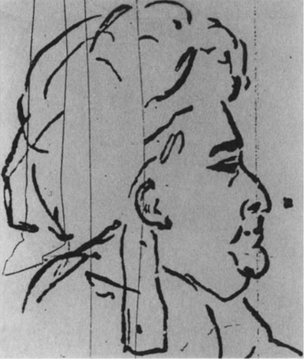
Sketch of Stevens, St. Louis Post-Dispatch, 1884.

Stevens was a gifted orator, and known throughout California as an earnest temperance worker. She led in the defeat of the "Holland bill", which dealt with licensed prostitution in California. She lectured for three years for the Good Templars and was for two years grand vice-templar, always maintaining a full treasury and increasing the membership. In 1874, she was elected Grand Conductor of the California Grand Lodge of the Sons of Temperance.

After the organization of the WCTU in California, she labored earnestly in that society. She contributed to the columns of all three of the State WCTU's organs -the Bulletin, Pharos, and Pacific Ensign- and served as State lecturer. She joined the Prohibition Party in 1882, and she led the movement, in 1888, to induce the WCTU to endorse that party. In 1890, Steven attended the national WCTU convention in Atlanta as a delegate, and became one of the national organizers. In the following year, at the request of the president of the Nevada WCTU, Stevens was detailed for work in that state, and left San Francisco, early in May. Beginning in Reno, she spent 44 days in Nevada. During this time, she traveled 1,000 miles, much of it through desert and sparsely populated locales. Owing to the peculiar conditions in the state, Stevens was sometimes obliged to pay for the user of a church and where no Unions existed, she had hotel bills, railroad, and hotel expenses. Stevens gave 44 addresses; fourteen women's and ten children's meetings were held; six Unions were visited and helped, and five Unions were organized.

Stevens was active in the benevolent work done in the Silver Star House, in sewing-schools and in various societies. In 1874, she instituted the Seamen's League in San Francisco, with her husband as president and herself an officer. In 1875, the old seamen's hospital was donated by Congress to carry on the work, and the institution became firmly established.

== Personal life ==
Stevens was a member of the Presbyterian Church. She married railroad secretary Augustus A. Stevens, before 1870. (Note: Willard & Livermore (1893) record the year of marriage as 1871.) In 1872, the San Francisco Chronicle made an implied comment that Stevens had been married previously, ergo her maiden name may not have been Pitts. She died 13 September 1906, age 65, from a cerebral hemorrhage.
