= Dorcas James Spencer =

American temperance activist and Native American advocate

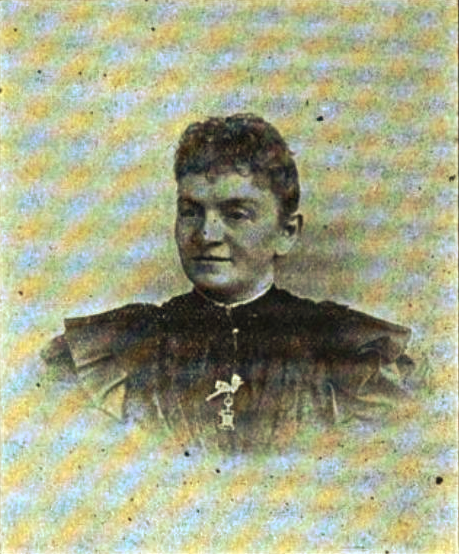
Dorcas J. Spencer (1894)

Dorcas James Spencer (née, Barber; January 7, 1841 – May 2, 1933) was an American temperance activist, writer, and advocate for Native American rights. Spencer served as President of the California State's W.C.T.U. (1894–97; 1904–06).

== Early life ==
Dorcas James Barber was born in Hopkinton, Rhode Island, on January 7, 1841. Her parents were Joseph Tillinghast Barber (1802-1875) and Nancy (née, James) Barber (1808-1884). Dorcas had several older siblings including: George, Charles, Phebe, Joseph, Gardiner, and Edward.

== Career ==
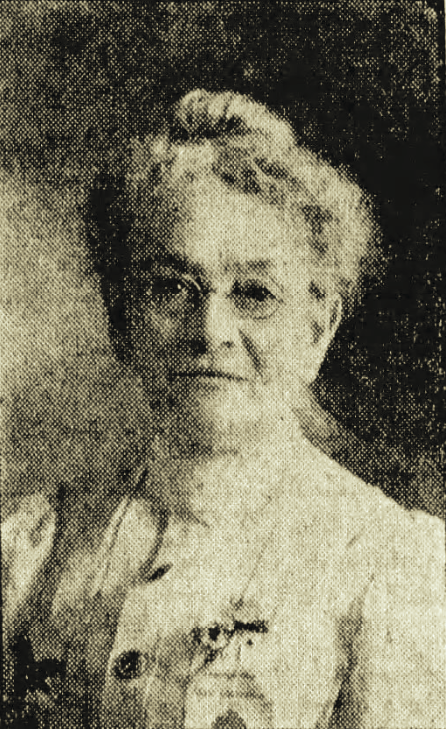
(1905)

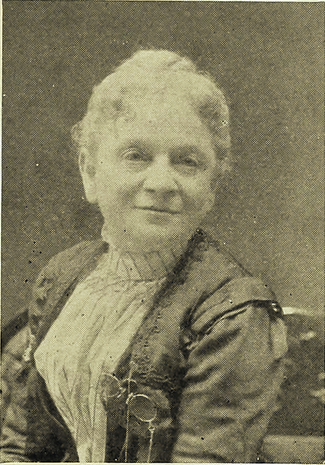
(1911)

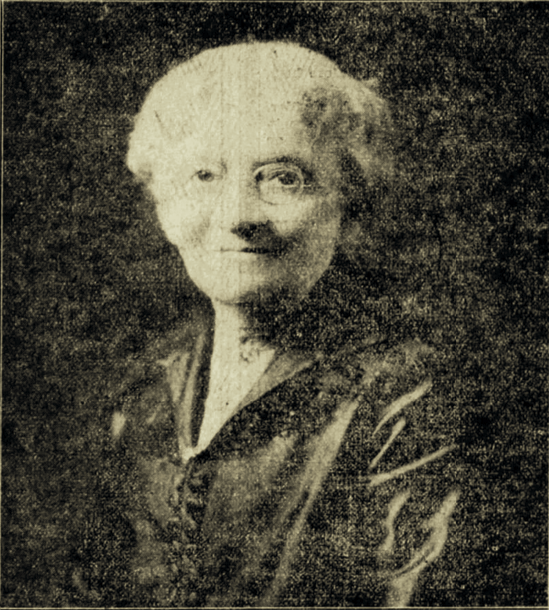
(1926)

Spencer removed to California in 1856.

She was continuously engaged in the temperance movement from its inception, having filled various responsible positions, becoming a specialist in several lines and proficient in many. Spencer was the first secretary of the first local Woman's Christian Temperance Union (W.C.T.U.) in California (Grass Valley, 1874) and the first State Organizer (1886). She was also the first Superintendent of Institutes (W.C.T.U. training schools in all the State unions) in California, holding that position until 1909.

She was the first W.C.T.U. lobbyist in the State Legislature, and so responsible for the passage of the Scientific Temperance Instruction Law, was state corresponding secretary for a term of 18 years, and the gifted of the W.C.T.U. state history.

Spencer was one of the seven stockholders who constituted the first Board of Directors of the Pacific Ensign, the State W.C.T.U.'s organ. She also served as the "Official Reporter" of state W.C.T.U. work to The Union Signal. When the Union Signal suffered a financial stress, Spencer voluntarily relinquished the compensation she had been receiving, and made her letters a gift to the official National W.C.T.U. organ. Thereafter, gratuitous reports became the rule of the paper, and the state made the appointment. Spencer continued to 1898; her name is again listed in 1900. Afterward, she served as "Special Correspondent".

Spencer was the sole survivor of the group of women who, on March 25, 1874, organized the W.C.T.U. in California, at Grass Valley. A celebration to commemorate the event occurred on April 25, 1926, and centered around Spencer.

As National superintendent of work among Indians, Spencer felt a strong bond between her department and the National W.C.T.U.'s department of Missionary Societies, and her volunteer service was highly valued by this department. At the Seventh Convention of the World's W.C.T.U. (Boston, 1906), Spencer spoke on the topic of "Protection of Native Races".

Spencer advocated for establishing schools on Indian reservations.

== Personal life ==
On January 17, 1858, she married William Kenyon Spencer (1822-1890), a stationer and bookseller. They had six children: Annie, William, Charles, Gardner, Frederick, and Franklin.

Dorcas J. Spencer died in Berkeley, California, on May 2, 1933, at the age of 94.

== Selected works ==
=== Books ===
A history of the W.C.T.U. of Northern and Central Calif

- A history of the Woman's Christian Temperance Union of Northern and Central California, 1911 (text)
- Billy (a novel)

=== Articles ===
- "Nationalization of the Liquor Traffic", 1894 (text)
- "What Shall We Do for the Indians?", 190? (text)
- "The Indian Problem", 190? (text)
- "Hints and Helps for Work Among the Indians", 190? (text)
- "Cornplanter: A Seneca Chief", 190? (text)
- "A Cry of Mother Love from the Depths", 190? (text)
- "Indians and Prohibition", 1916 (text)
- "Birth Control: Morality and Habits of a Primitive Race", 1918 (text)
