= Alexander P. Crittenden =

American politician (1816–1870)

Alexander Parker Crittenden
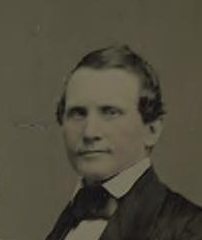

Chairman of the state Southern Democratic Central Committee
- In office 1861–Unknown

Alexander Parker Crittenden (January 14, 1816 – November 5, 1870) was a 19th-century pioneering attorney and politician in California, and a member of the influential Crittenden family of Kentucky.

== Early life ==
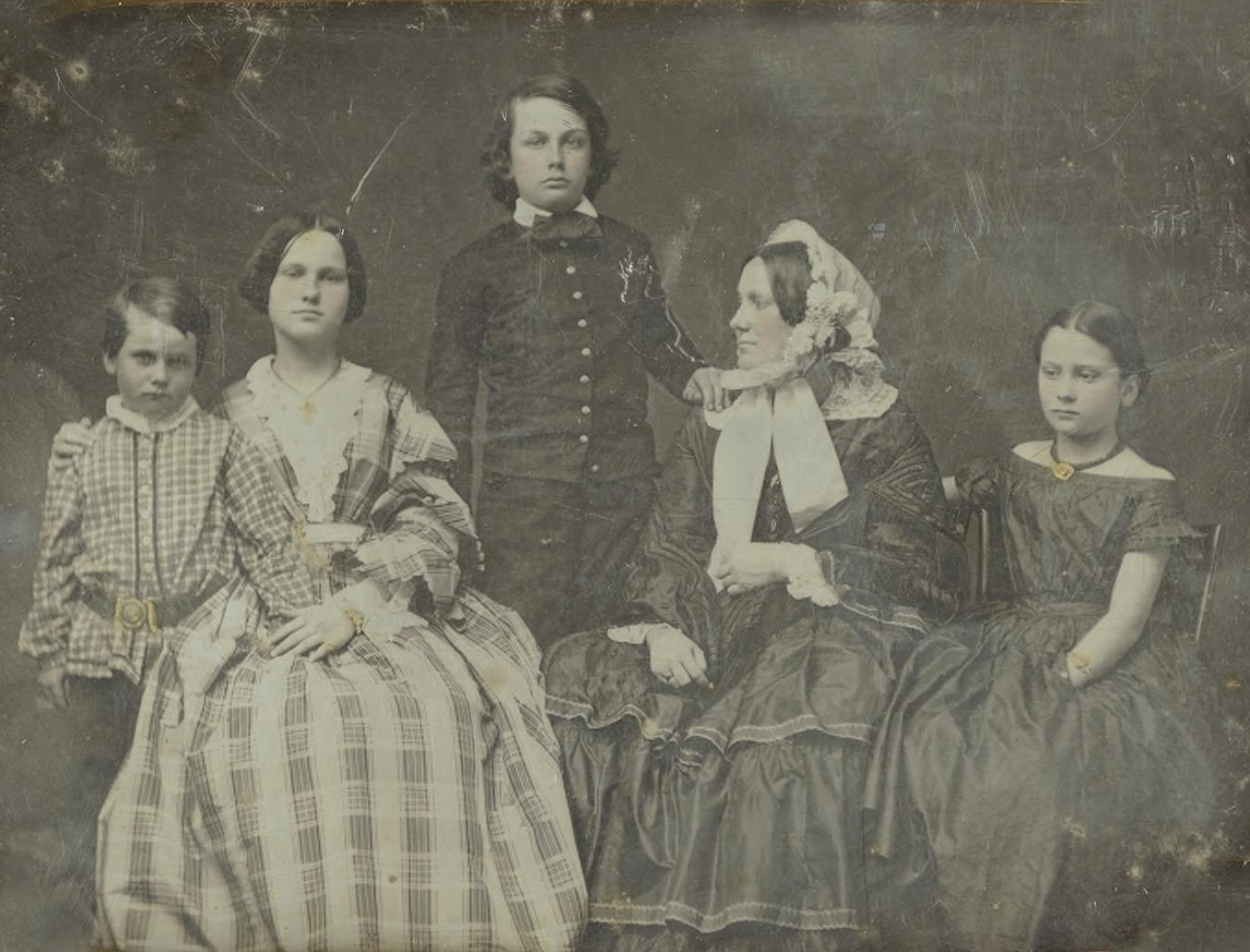
Clara Jones Crittenden and four of her children, ca. 1855

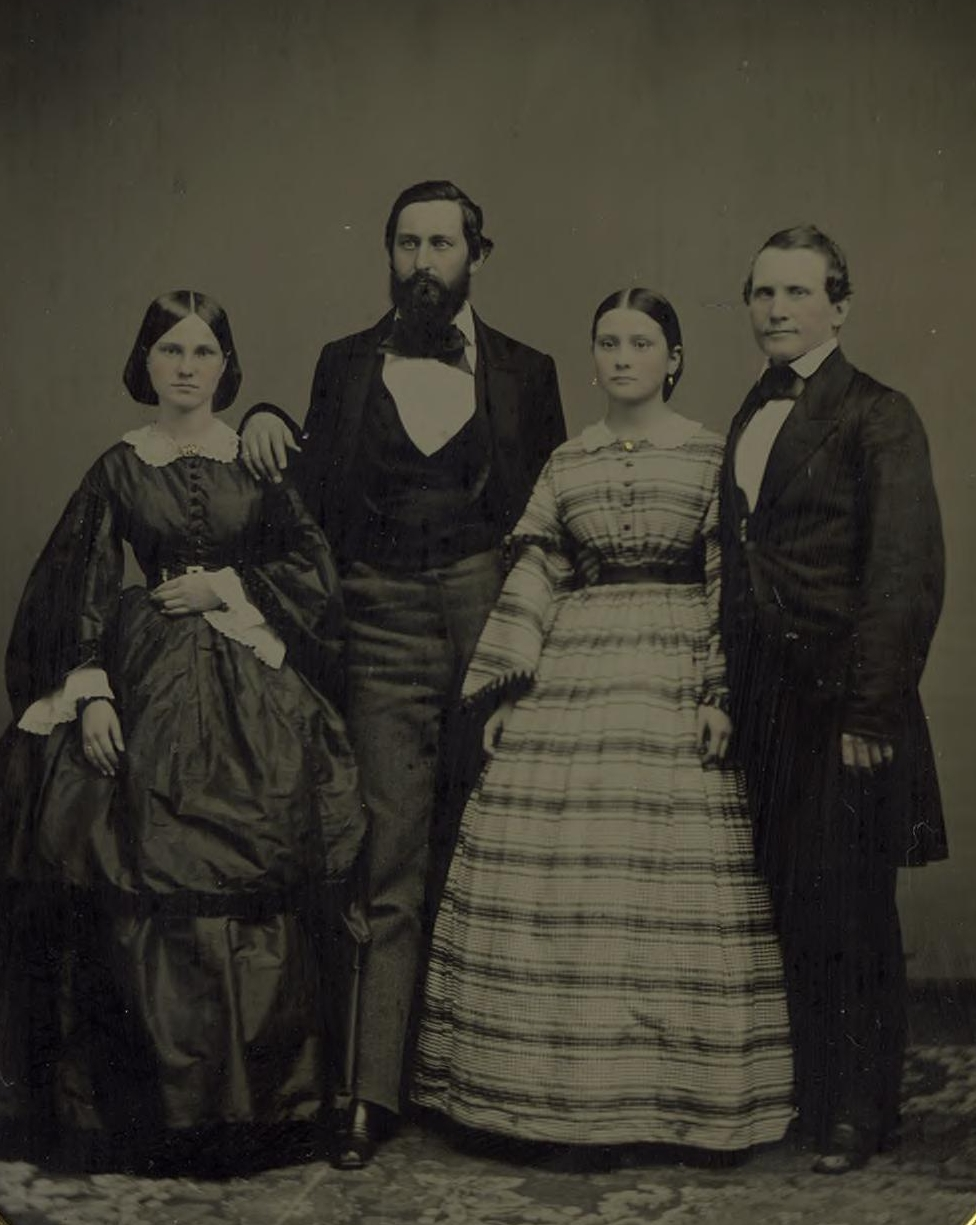
Laura Crittenden Sanchez, Ramon Sanchez, Ann Churchill Crittenden and Alexander P. Crittenden, ca. 1863

Alexander Parker " A.P." Crittenden was born in 1816 to Thomas Turpin Crittenden (1788–1832) and Mary Wilson Parker (1792–1869) in Lexington, Kentucky. He was the nephew of John Jordan Crittenden and grandson of John Crittenden Sr.

He graduated from West Point in 1836 at age 20. He had once been expelled for a prank but was reinstated by appealing directly to President Andrew Jackson. He joined the army as a Lieutenant of Artillery, but quickly resigned his commission. He gained employment as an engineer for railroad companies. In 1838 he married Clara Churchill Jones Crittenden (1820–1881), and they had fourteen children altogether, but only eight lived to adulthood.

In 1839, the family moved to Brazoria County, Texas where Crittenden read law, was admitted to the bar, and started practicing law. In 1849, seeking wealth, he trekked on horseback by way of Mexico and Arizona to Los Angeles, California. His traveling companions included James Audubon and Parker's brother-in-law, Dr. Alexander Jones, who suffered a knife wound in a fight in Tucson, Arizona.

In Los Angeles, nearly bereft of funds, Crittenden was elected to the first California legislature and was provided the means for the trip to San Jose. He chaired the judiciary committee in the 1st and 2nd state assemblies. He authored legislation to incorporate the City of Los Angeles and facilitated introduction of the English Common Law into the California statutes.

His wife, Clara, via Panama, with six children and 2 servants joined him in Santa Clara County, California in 1852.

He established law practice in San Francisco, Crittenden and Randolph, and served as counsel in 26 Supreme Court of California cases. He helped administer the William Walker (filibuster) conquest of Nicaragua in 1855. He spoke against the vigilantes, and kept his uncle in the U.S. Senate, John Jordan Crittenden appraised of that activity.

== Civil War ==
In 1861, he became the leader of the southern wing of the California Democratic Party and was elected chairman of the state Southern Democratic Central Committee, of Confederate sympathies. In 1863, with his brother-in-law attorney/politician Tod Robinson, he relocated to Virginia City, Nevada Territory after refusing to take the wartime oath of allegiance to the federal government. In Nevada Territory, Crittenden handled mining claims cases, and speculated in mining stocks. He lived in Virginia City and Aurora. He was defeated as the Esmeralda County, Nevada representative to the Nevada state constitutional convention in 1863.

Clara remained in San Francisco and assisted the wife of Confederate Gen. Albert Sidney Johnston who had gone east for the war; falling in 1862 at Shiloh. The families had been connected in friendship and politics back in the Texas Republic.

The Crittenden extended family personified Lincoln's House Divided Speech during the American Civil War. Two of Parker's sons, Churchill and James Love, joined the Confederate States Army without their father's permission. After he sent them to Europe, they jumped the ship in Havana and made their ways to the Confederacy. Churchill Jones Crittenden (1840–1864), a private in the 1st Maryland Cavalry, CSA, was later captured behind the Union lines and executed as a spy; James Love Crittenden (1841–1915) had risen to be captain.

Cousin George Bibb Crittenden served the CSA as a general while other cousins, Gen. Thomas L. Crittenden and Lt. Col. Thomas Theodore Crittenden remained loyal to the Union. His brother Thomas Turpin Crittenden, a veteran of the Mexican War, commanded a regiment in the first land battle of the Civil War at Philippi in western Virginia - a Union win. Later he was captured by Gen. Nathan B. Forrest in the Battle of Stones River.

== The Laura Fair affair ==
In Virginia City he met and started a relationship with Laura Fair, the owner of the Tahoe House Hotel. Initially Fair believed him to be single, and when she discovered he was married, he allegedly promised to divorce his wife. In November 1870, as he sat next to Clara aboard the ferry from Oakland to San Francisco, Fair shot him in the heart; he died the next day, November 5, 1870.

Fair's subsequent sensationalized trials, revealing the tawdry details of the prolonged affair, exposed the family to great embarrassment. Fair was the first woman sentenced to hang in California, but was freed after a retrial.

== Legacy ==
Alexander Parker Crittenden's letters are preserved by the University of Michigan, Clements Library. He traveled through many places in historic times and took part in events being a keen observer and skilled writer.

== See also ==
- California in the American Civil War
