= Sarah Brown Ingersoll Cooper =

American educator, author, evangelist, philanthropist and civic activist

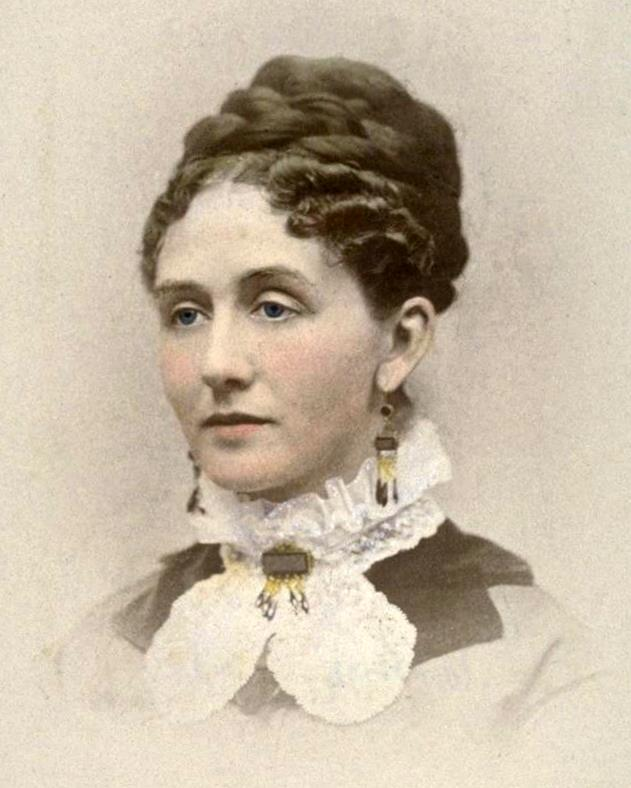
- "A Woman of the Century"
- Born: Sarah Brown Ingersoll; December 12, 1835; Cazenovia, New York
- Died: December 11, 1896 (aged 60)
- Education: Cazenovia Seminary, Troy Female Seminary
- Occupations: Educator, suffragist
- Spouse: Halsey Fenimore Cooper (m. 1855; died 1885)

Signature
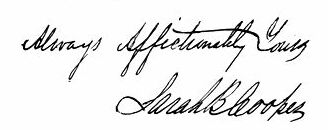

Sarah Brown Ingersoll Cooper (December 12, 1835 – December 11, 1896) was an American educator, author, evangelist, philanthropist, and civic activist. She is remembered as a religious teacher and for her efforts to increase the interest in kindergarten work. Cooper was the first president of the International Kindergarten Union, president of the National Kindergarten Union, president and vice-president of the Woman's Press Association, president of the Woman's Suffrage Association, and president of the Woman's Christian Temperance Union.

She was vice-president of the Century Club, treasurer of the World's Federation of Woman's Clubs, a director of the Associated Charities, and one of the five women elected to the Pan-Republican Congress. At the 1893 World's Fair, she delivered thirty-six addresses, and on her return, helped to organize the Woman's Congress of which she was president for two years and at the time of her death. Several years before her death, Cooper became a convert to equal suffrage and was president of the Amendment Campaign Committee. A few months before her death, Cooper stated that she was an officer of nineteen societies for charitable purposes.

She wrote and received many letters. The assertion was made that the letters which she answered in the year before she died numbered 11,000. She wrote extensively on topics related to women, children, and education.

== Early life and education ==
Sarah Brown Ingersoll was born in Cazenovia, New York, December 12, 1835. (Note: According to Willard & Livermore (1893), Sarah Brown Ingersoll was born December 12, 1836.) She had two younger sisters who became Mrs. J. A. Skilton and Mrs. Reese M. Rawlings. Her mother died when she was a little child, and she was adopted by her great-aunt, over 70 years of age. Col. Robert G. Ingersoll was a cousin.

When twelve years old, she appeared in print in the village paper, the Madison County Whig, and from that time, she was more or less engaged in literary work on papers and magazines. When but fourteen years of age, she opened a Sunday-school class in Eagle Village, 8 miles (13 km) from Cazenovia, and that class was the start of what became a church congregation. When she started the school, some of the committeemen came to her and told her that, while they believed her to be qualified in every way to teach, at the same time they would all like it better if she would go home and lengthen her skirts.

She was graduated from the Cazenovia Seminary in 1853, the first coeducational institution in the U.S., and numbering among its graduates Leland Stanford, Phillip Armour, and Charles Dudley Warner—all lifelong friends of Mrs. Cooper. She subsequently attended the Troy Female Seminary, of which Frances Willard was principal, studying music and modern languages.

== Career ==
After her graduation from college, she went to Augusta, Georgia, as a governess in the family of Governor William Schley. On the Governor's plantation, there were 500 or more slaves, and Cooper (then Miss Ingersoll), used to gather them about her to teach them Holy Scripture.

While in Augusta in 1855, she married Halsey Fenimore Cooper, also a Cazenovia Seminary graduate, who had been appointed by President Franklin Pierce to the office of surveyor and inspector of the port of Chattanooga, Tennessee. They also worked as editors on The Advertiser, with Mrs. Cooper assisting Mr. Cooper. They had two daughters, Harriet ("Hattie") (b. 1856) and Mollie (b. 1861), as well as two sons, who died in infancy.

As abolitionists, the Coopers went north at the start of the Civil War. They settled briefly in Washington, D.C., then moved to Memphis, Tennessee in 1863, where Mr. Cooper was appointed assessor of internal revenue. There, Mrs. Cooper was elected president of the Society for the Aid of Refugees. She taught a large Bible class, which comprised from 100 to 300 soldiers. In 1864, after Mollie died, Mrs. Cooper began to suffer from depression and illness. For two years, she attempted to recuperate in Saint Paul, Minnesota. She recovered when the family moved to San Francisco, California in 1869, where Mr. Cooper worked for the IRS. She became a staff member of the Overland Monthly, workinging as a proof-reader, essayist, and book reviewer. She also penned articles for the religious press, and researched and wrote field reports regarding education in California for the U.S. government in Washington, D.C.

Her first Bible class in San Francisco was in the Howard Presbyterian Church, where Dr. Scudder was filling the pulpit. From there, she went to the Calvary Presbyterian Church. It was there that Mrs. Cooper was tried for heresy, because she could not conscientiously subscribe to the doctrines of infant damnation or everlasting punishment. Mrs. Cooper was welcomed to the First Congregational Church, where she afterward remained.

Still later, opened the class in the First Congregational Church. That class numbered over 300 members and embraced persons representing many religious sects, including the Jewish and the Roman Catholic faiths. While the credit of establishing the first free kindergarten in San Francisco is due to Prof. Felix Adler and a few of his friends, yet the credit of the extraordinary growth of the work is almost entirely due to Mrs. Cooper, who paid a visit to the Silver Street Free Kindergarten in November, 1878, and from that moment became the leader of the kindergarten work and the friend of the training school for kindergarten teachers.

The rapid growth of the free kindergarten system in California had its first impulse in six articles written by Mrs. Cooper for the San Francisco Bulletin in 1879. The first of these was entitled "The Kindergarten, a Remedy for Hoodlumism," and was of vital interest to the public, for just at that time, ruffianism was so terrific, that a vigilance committee was organized to protect the citizens. The second article was "The History of the Silver Street Free Kindergarten."

In the early part of 1878, there was not a free Kindergarten on the western side of the Rocky Mountains; by 1892, there were 65 in San Francisco, and several others in progress of organization. Outside of San Francisco, they extended from the extreme northern part of Washington to Southern California and New Mexico, and they formed in Oregon, Nevada, and Colorado, and in almost every large city and town in California. Mrs. Cooper attributed the rapid strides in that work in San Francisco to the fact that wealthy persons, induced to study the work for themselves, became convinced of its permanent and essential value to the State. The second free kindergarten in San Francisco was opened under the auspices of Cooper's Bible class, in October, 1879. She founded the "Jackson Street Kindergarten Association" in 1879. (Note: According to Faithfull (1884), Cooper opened the first Kindergarten in the American West.)

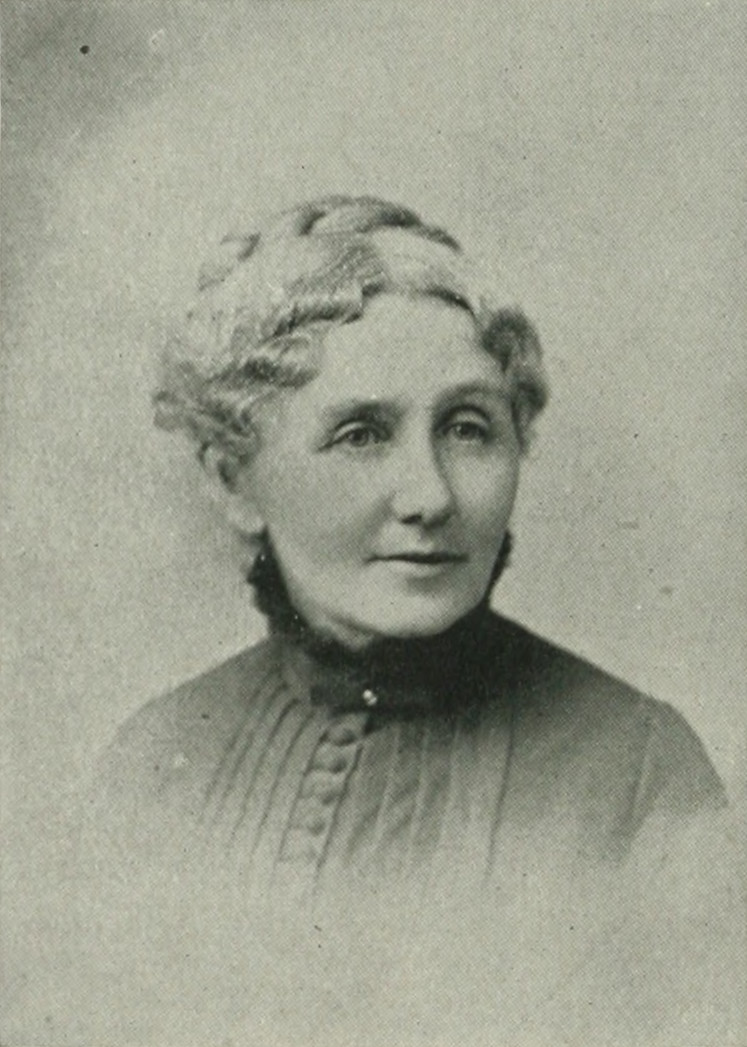
Cooper in an undated photo

In 1882, Mrs. Leland Stanford, who had been an active helper in the work from the very first, dedicated a large sum for the establishment of free kindergartens, in San Francisco and in adjacent towns, in memory of her son. Then other memorial kindergartens were endowed. By 1892, 32 kindergartens were under the care of Mrs. Cooper and her daughter, Harriet. Over US$300,000 was donated to Mrs. Cooper to carry on this work in San Francisco, and over 10,000 children were trained in these schools. Her notable and historical trial for heresy in 1881 made her famous as a religious teacher and did much to increase the wide interest in her kindergarten work. Mrs. Cooper is a philanthropist and devotes all her time to benevolent work.

Cooper served as a director of the Associated Charities, vice-president of the Pacific Coast Women's Press Association, member of the Century Club and the leader of one of the largest Bible classes in the United States. Considered to be one of the best-known and best-loved women on the Pacific coast, she was elected a member of the Pan-Republic Kindergarten Congress of 1893, one of five women of the world who had that distinguished honor, along with Mary Simmerson Cunningham Logan, Mary Virginia Ellet Cabell, president of the Daughters of the American Revolution, Frances Willard, and Clara Barton, of the American Red Cross. She was also a speaker while at the World's Columbian Exposition (Chicago, 1893).

She was elected treasurer of the World's Federation of Women's Clubs in 1894.

In 1895, she served as president of the National Kindergarten Union. She was the first president of the International Kindergarten Union.

== Personal life ==
In 1879, Halsey lost his job as Deputy Surveyor and the family suffered financial difficulties. As a result of the strain, he committed suicide in 1885. After attempting to clear her husband's name, Sarah continued her philanthropic career. She taught both the Bible School and Kindergarten, and was involved with women's rights groups. Her daughter, Harriet had quit her teaching job to assist Sarah, but suffered from bouts of depression, especially following the death of her father. Harriet asphyxiated her mother and herself on December 11, 1896, by turning on the gas, with suicidal intent, after her mother (who would have turned 61 the following day) had fallen asleep.
