= Emelie Tracy Y. Swett =

American poet

Emelie Tracy Swett
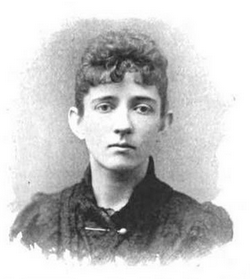
- Born: Emelie Tracy Young Swett; March 9, 1863; San Francisco, California, U.S.
- Died: April 21, 1892 (aged 29); San Francisco, California, U.S.
- Resting place: Mountain View Cemetery, Oakland, California, U.S.
- Education: Girls' High School, San Francisco
- Occupations: Author, editor
- Spouse: John W. Parkhurst (m. 1889)
- Writing career
- Genres: poetry, prose, drama, translation

Emelie Tracy Young Swett (after marriage, Parkhurst; March 9, 1863 – April 21, 1892) was an American author, editor, poet and translator. She wrote both prose and verse, and in her literary work was often employed by publishers to translate French and German articles and books. She was at one time employed as the private secretary of a publishing house, and in this capacity she developed executive abilities. In 1889, she married John W. Parkhurst, an employee in the Bank of California. Swett contributed largely to the magazines and papers of the Pacific Coast. Her literary work included translations from Greek, French and German and some finished poems of high merit. She dramatized Helen Hunt Jackson's novel Ramona. She founded the Pacific Coast Women's Press Association. She supported suffrage. For a year before her death, at the age of 29, she was assistant editor of the Californian Illustrated Magazine.

== Early life and education ==
Emelie Tracy Young Swett was born in San Francisco, California, 9 March 1863, the daughter of Professor John Swett of California, known as "The Father of Pacific Coast Education" and the author of educational works, which were used in the United States, Europe and Australia. Both Professor Swett and his wife were inclined to literature. Her grandfather, Frederick Palmer Tracy, was well known as a writer and an orator.

Swett's education was partly received in public schools of San Francisco, and partly with tutors in modern and ancient languages, literature, music and mathematics. At age 16, in high school, she was one of 75 competitors for the prize of a gold watch and chain offered by the San Francisco Chronicle for the best Christmas story, and she was awarded the prize, for the best short story contributed by a child. She was graduated from the normal department of the Girls' High School in 1881.

== Career ==
After graduation, she spent some time in France. Returning to California, Swett became a teacher in the kindergarten schools of San Francisco. It was in 1879, when the second Free Kindergarten west of the Rocky Mountains was organized, at 116 Jackson Street, that Swett, then an earnest, enthusiastic student, became deeply interested in the needy, neglected children of the Barbary Coast, that had been grouped for training and improvement. It was not long until a Second Class was organized in the same building, from the overflow of Class No.1. In the absence of a trained Kindergartner, and while waiting to secure the same, Swett took the work in hand, and day after day, was as faithful at her post as if she were a paid teacher of the Association.

Unable to find employment in the city school department, she accepted a position as teacher of music and French in a private seminary at Eureka, California.

She left to go abroad, and, while away, acted as correspondent to several eastern and western papers. The first earnest literary work done by her consisted of translations of French and German scientific works and historical novels for a New York City firm. She also was private secretary to a San Francisco publisher but still wrote prose and verse.

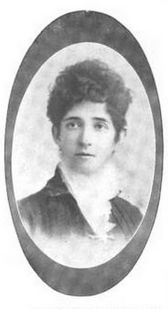
Emelie Parkhurst

Swett married John W. Parkhurst, of the Bank of California, in 1889, but retained her maiden name for her professional work. After her marriage, she organized the Pacific Coast Literary Bureau, and out of it grew the Pacific Coast Women's Press Association, and she served as corresponding secretary of the latter organization. When Parkhurst founded the Pacific Coast Women's Press Association, she had hard work to find sufficient members. The dilettante rushed in with outstretched hands begging for permission to pay dues and be called authors and journalists, but the majority of working writers held aloof. Parkhurst's idea was to have the association a genuine press club, but she died before she could bring her plans to completion.

Parkhurst wrote much in the editorial line, and her literary work includes Greek, French, and German translations and new poetry. She wrote a biography of Charles Edward de Villers in French and English. She dramatized Helen Hunt Jackson's novel, Ramona. The play concerns a story of discrimination against indigenous people in southern California.

Parkhurst became the manager of a literary bureau which she established in 1889, which handled the work of more than 600 writers. The principal work of the bureau was to write, or have written, finely illustrated outdoor articles for the eastern and London magazines. She contributed to the Magazine of Poetry, the California Illustrated Magazine, The Overland Monthly, the American Home Journal, the San Francisco Call, San Francisco Bulletin, Philadelphia Times, Outing, Popular Science News, Golden State Catholic, Pacific States, and was an occasional contributor to other periodicals. Her mentors included: James T. White, the New York publisher; Charles H. Shinn, editor of The Overland; George R. Cathcart, of New York, and W. C. Bartlett, of the San Francisco Bulletin.

For a year before her death, she was assistant editor of the Californian Illustrated Magazine, who offered the following tribute to her memory: "The Pacific Coast world of letters has suffered a loss in the past month in the death of Emily Tracy (Swett) Parkhurst. Parkhurst was connected with the Californian as an assistant editor, was a contributor to its columns, and wrote its literary reviews. She was a woman of rare promise, possessed of great talent, which, combined with executive ability, made her a prominent figure in many assemblies. Her especial work was the formation of the Pacific Coast Women's Press Association. A few years ago she traveled through the state and made the personal acquaintance of all the Pacific Coast writers, her object being to advance the interests of women writers — bring them out and aid them in obtaining a field for their work. In this she was extremely successful. She gathered about her hundreds of contributors to the literary press of the day, and finally organized the Press Association, of which she became secretary. The work thus accomplished did much in encouraging women to make a fight for themselves, and by her means many are now self-supporting who, previous to the movement, realized little or nothing from their literary work. Parkhurst combined rare executive ability with literary discernment and taste, and was a brilliant organizer. At the time of her death, she had plans laid out for work that would have appalled many. One was a thorough investigation of the possibility of woman's work in horticulture and agriculture in this state. This was not theory, as the plan included a system by which women could enter the lists with men in farming and marketing their products. Few women had so large an acquaintance; few will be missed by so great a number; and so a well-spent, bright life is ended, apparently cut short, yet leaving a rich heritage, a rare example to those who are left behind."

== Personal life ==
Parkhurst died in childbirth in San Francisco on April 21, 1892, at the age of 29. Her daughter was Ruth Emilie Parkhurst.

== Selected works ==
- A Transportation Aristocrat, 1885
- The Country Workshop, 1889
- Roschen, Chapters I-V, 1890
