= Mary Lynde Craig =

Writer, teacher, attorney, women's rights activist

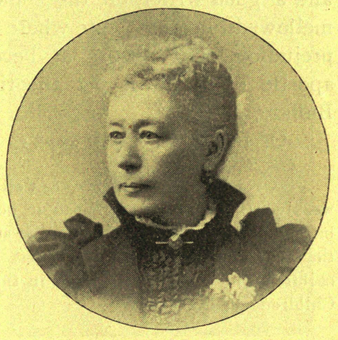
- Mary Lynde Hoffman-Craig, from an 1893 publication.
- Born: Mary Delano Catherine Lynde; March 24, 1834; Vermont, U.S.
- Died: June 20, 1921 (aged 87); San Francisco, California, U.S.
- Occupations: writer; teacher; attorney; activist
- Partner(s): Samuel Foster (m. 1862); T. W. Hoffman (m. ?); Scipio Craig (m. 1892)
- Writing career
- Language: English

Mary Lynde Craig (née, Lynde; after first marriage, Foster; after second marriage, Hoffman; after third marriage, Craig; March 24, 1834 – June 20, 1921) was an American writer, teacher, and attorney. She moved to California in 1859. She owned property in San Francisco, and was an activist for women's property rights. Craig served as associate editor of the Redlands, California The Citrograph. In 1893, she was one of four women practicing law in California. In 1891, she gave the "Address of Weicome" at the organization of Sequoia Chapter, San Francisco. While attending the National Editorial Association at Chicago with her husband, in May 1893, she also had opportunity to speak to other large audiences—once at the Auditorium, once at the Art Palace, and once at the Woman's Building. She served as president of the Pacific Coast Women's Press Association and historian of the Hastings Law column.

== Early years ==
Mary Delano Catherine Lynde was born in Vermont on March 24, 1834. Her parent were Aaron Phipps Lynde and Nancy Melinda (Walker) Lynde. She was of American Revolutionary War ancestry, descended from Lieut. Benjamin Lynde, of the Continental Army.

== Career ==
Lynde moved to California in 1859 to take up a teaching post at the Lincoln Primary School on Fifth and Market Streets. By the following year, she was working as the principal and teacher at Denman School. On February 1, 1862, she married Samuel Foster with whom she had her only child, Samuel Lynde Foster (1863–1951). After Foster's death, in 1866, she moved briefly back to Springfield where she taught in the newly created consolidated secondary school, before returning to San Francisco to teach at Lincoln Grammar School and then later at San Francisco Girls' High School. When Foster's father died in 1872, her mother moved to San Francisco, where she taught in the Chinese Mission and lived with Foster. Sometime later, she married Henry Fitz Warren Hoffman, a prominent businessman and benefactor of the city.

Henry died in December 1890 and in September, 1891 Hoffman entered University of California, Hastings College of the Law. The reason she gave for entering law school at the age of 60 was to enable her to better support herself. On December 10, 1891, she gave the "Address of Welcome" at the organization of Sequoia Chapter, San Francisco, thereafter serving as historian of the Chapter. About this time, she gave an address upon "Country Roads and City Streets," before the Pacific Coast Women's Press Association, of which she was treasurer. This address was published by the Press Association as a monograph, and having been translated into Norwegian, was widely read in the US and in Europe. Scipio Craig, president of the Editorial Association of Southern California, published the address, intact, in his paper, The Citrograph, and sent greeting to its author. On November 12, 1892, at Vallejo, California, they married. She wrote for magazines and newspapers from New York to San Francisco. At the time, she was the president of the Pacific Coast Women's Press association, historian of the Hastings Law column, and "a writer of note". In 1893, she was admitted to the California Bar, as only the second woman in California to practice law. She then returned to college to take the degree of LL.B. Having taught for many years at the San Francisco Girls' High School, Craig retired in 1894.

After her third marriage, Craig became the associate editor of The Citrograph. While in Chicago, in 1893, Craig spoke to large audiences, including at the Auditorium, at the Art Palace, and at the Woman's Building. Craig kept a home in San Francisco and Redlands, California. While a widow, she superintended the studies of her son who received a degree from Harvard College.

== Death and legacy ==
Craig died on 20 June 1921 at her home in San Francisco. The tens of thousands of dollars that writing and teaching had brought her was spent on others. Hoffman Avenue in San Francisco was named for Craig.

== Selected works ==
- 1894, Is legislation needed for women? : an address ... read before the Woman's parliament of Southern California, Los Angeles, October 11, 1893.
- 1901, Country roads and city streets : an address before the Pacific coast women's press association, July 18, 1901
