= Louise E. Francis =

American journalist (1869–1932)

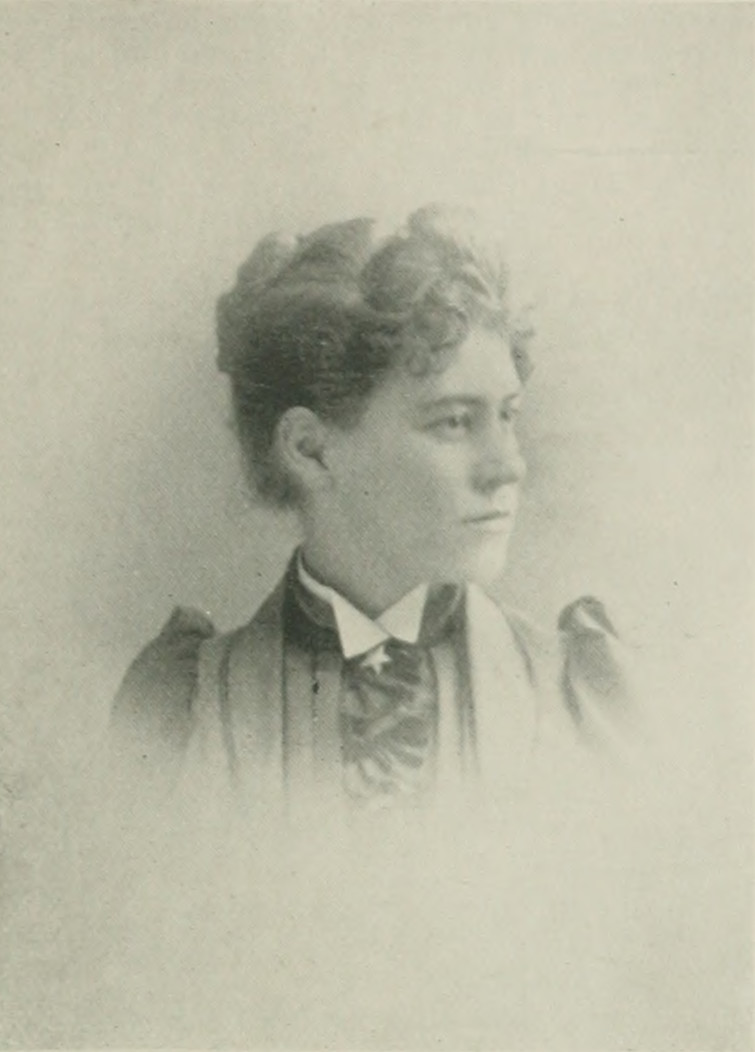
- Portrait photo from A Woman of the Century
- Born: April 23, 1869 St. Helena, California, U.S.
- Died: March 22, 1932 (aged 62) Los Angeles, California, U.S.
- Resting place: Valhalla Memorial Park Cemetery
- Occupation: Journalist; newspaper editor; owner of a daily newspaper; author; lecturer
- Spouse: Henry T. Spaller (m. 1909)

Louise E. Francis (after marriage, Louise Francis Spaller; nickname, "Still Water"; 1869–1932) was an American journalist. She served as editor of the California Daily Report and the Castroville Enterprise, as well as special correspondent for the St. Louis Post-Dispatch, Detroit News-Tribune, The Grand Rapids Press, and San Francisco Chronicle. She was a member of the Alabama and California press associations, and recording secretary of the National Editorial Association (now National Newspaper Association) for 1892 and 1893. She was also associated with the Chautauqua Literary and Scientific Circle (CLSC). Francis was the first woman editor and owner of a daily newspaper in California.

== Early life and education ==
Louise E. Francis was born in St. Helena, California, on April 23, 1869. Her father was Jesse G. Francis; her mother was Mrs. Whiteman.

Her teacher, noticing the marked love for books manifested by his pupil, "Still Water", as she was called, took pains to see that her thirst for reading was quenched only by good books. She was educated in the public schools of her native town, graduating at the age of fourteen, as the salutatorian of her class. She afterward attended a private academy for 18 months and subsequently finished her education at the State Normal School (now San Jose State University). Her forte was writing compositions, and her part in the school exercises was always to furnish one of her own articles.

== Career ==
Her writing talent grew, and when at the age of seventeen she went out in the world to make a living for herself, she naturally turned to an editor's office. She remained in the office of the Santa Clara Valley, a monthly magazine in the Santa Clara Valley, for three years, taking full charge of the household and young folks' departments, and adding an occasional literary note. She then rested for a year. Next, she acted as a correspondent for the San Jose Daily Mercury during the summer meetings of the CLSC. Through that engagement, she formed the acquaintance of T. A. Peckham, and with him went into partnership and started a newspaper in Monterey, called the Enterprise. The project did not prove a financial success, and after six months, was discontinued.

On April 3, 1891, with little money, a new Enterprise was started, this time in Castroville, of which Francis was the sole editor, proprietor, and publisher. She wrote every line that went into her paper, locals, editorials, and everything else, was her own business manager, kept her own books, solicited all the advertisements, and when needed to do so, set type, ran the press, and mailed the papers to the subscribers. The new venture was successful, and Francis made her paper one of the best in California. It was the official organ of the Pacific Coast Women's Press Association and thus had a wider influence than ordinary newspapers.

Francis was elected one of the delegates to the National Editorial Association that met in California in May 1892. The following year, she was a member of the Literary Committee of the World's Congress of Representative Women (Chicago, 1893).

Between 1893 and 1902, Francis was a traveling newspaper correspondent and assisted Prof. Newton N. Riddel, the lecturer, in his research in heredity, sociology, psychic phenomena, and kindred topics. She was also the author of several psychology-related books.

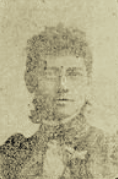
The Atchison County Journal (1901)

In July 1901, she gave four talks at the Rock Port Lecture Congress and Musical Jubilee, in Rockport, Missouri. Francis also served as a lecturer for the CLSC. Subsequently, she devoted her entire time to literary pursuits in Chicago and elsewhere in the Eastern United States. in 1904, held the title of Special Chautauqua Agent, of Chicago.

== Personal life ==
On July 14, 1909, in Portland, Oregon, she married Henry T. Spaller, and they made their home in Chicago.

Louise Francis Spaller died in Los Angeles, California, on March 22, 1932. The burial was in that city's Valhalla Memorial Park Cemetery.

== Selected works ==
=== By Louise E. Francis ===
- "Shakespeare's Uncanny Characters", Education, A Monthly Magazine, Vol. 11 (Boston, Frank H. Kasson, 1891)
- "Food and Mentality", Dietetic and Hygienic Gazette, Vol. 12, No. 7 (July 1896)
- "My Impressions of the Invalids' Home", The Journal of Hygeio Therapy, Vol. 27, No. 8 ((Published by the Shakers, May 1897)
- Human nature explained (with Newton N. Riddell) (1897)

=== By Louise Francis Speller ===
- Personal help for girls (1918) (text)
- Personal help for young women (1920) (text)
- Personal help for boys (1921)
- Home counsel library (with William A. McKeever and T. W. Shannon) (1926). Previously issued under title: The Science of living
