= Helen Stuart Campbell =

American writer, academic, social reformer, and home economist

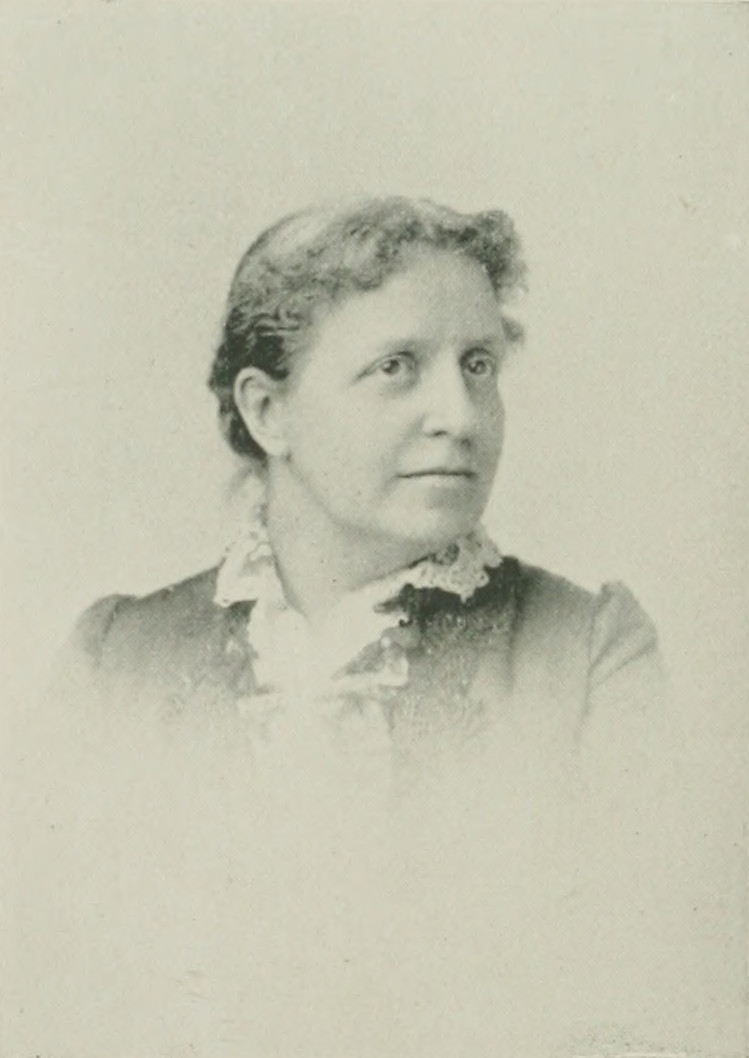
- "A Woman of the Century"
- Born: Helen Campbell Stuart; July 5, 1839; Lockport, New York, U.S.
- Died: July 2, 1918 (aged 78); Dedham, Massachusetts, U.S.
- Resting place: Eliot, Maine, U.S.
- Education: Mrs. Cook's seminary, Bloomington, New Jersey
- Occupations: Author; editor; social reformer; home economist
- Writing career
- Pen name: Helen Weeks, Helen Campbell, Helen Wheaton
- Language: English
- Notable work: Household Economics
- Movement: home economics

Helen Stuart Campbell (pen names, Helen Weeks, Helen Campbell, Helen Wheaton; (Note: She was born "Helen Campbell Stuart". Her married name, which she also used for some of her writing, was "Helen Campbell Weeks". She used the pen names of "Helen Campbell" (1860s) and "Helen Wheaton". In 1877, she changed her legal name to "Helen Stuart Campbell".) July 5, 1839 – July 22, 1918) was an American author, economist, and editor, as well as a social and industrial reformer. She was a pioneer in the field of home economics. Her Household Economics (1897) was an early textbook in the field of domestic science.

Her first literary work was a series of stories for children, which appeared between 1864 and 1870 in Our Young Folks and The Riverside Magazine, and in book form as the Ainslee Series; then, in rapid succession, she published: His Grandmothers (1877); Six Sinners (1878); Unto the Third and Fourth Generation (1880); Four, and What They Did (1880); The Easiest Way in Housekeeping and Cooking; Adapted to Domestic Use or Study in Classes (1881); Patty Pearson's Boy: A Tale of Two Generations (1881); The Problem of the Poor: A Record of Quiet Work in Unquiet Places (1882); Under Green Apple Boughs (1882); The American Girl's Home-Book of Work and Play (1883); The Housekeeper's Year-Book (1888); Mrs. Herndon's Income (1883); The What-to-Do Club: A Story for Girls (1885); Miss Melinda's Opportunity (1886); Prisoners of Poverty: Women Wage-workers, their Trades and their Lives (1887 and 1893); Roger Berkeley's Probation (1888); Prisoners of Poverty Abroad (1888); Darkness and Daylight (1891); In Foreign Kitchens (1894); Some Passages in the Practice of Dr. Martha Scarborough (1895); and Household Economics (1897). At the turn of the century, she published, Ballantyne: a Novel (1901).

== Early life and education ==
Helen Campbell Stuart was born in Lockport, New York to Jane E. (née Campbell) and Homer H. Stuart (died 1890). Both parents were Vermonters, of Scotch ancestry. The Stuart family, after settling in the United States, was prominent in early colonial affairs, three generations fighting and dying in Indian, French and revolutionary wars. Homer removed, in 1839, to New York City, where he practiced law for over 50 years, being also for some years president of the Continental Bank Note Company, of New York.

She was educated in a school at Warren, Rhode Island, and at Mrs. Cook's seminary, Bloomington, New Jersey (1850–58).

== Career ==
=== Children's writer ===
About 1859 or 1860, she married an army surgeon, Dr. Grenville Mellen Weeks. She thereafter lived in various portions of the U.S., during which time she gained experience which has reappeared in her literary work.

At the age of 23, under her married name, Helen C. Weeks, she began work for children, writing steadily for Our Young Folks, the Riverside Magazine and other juvenile periodicals. Like all her subsequent work, these articles were vital, magnetic and infused with humor and pathos. Soon her stories grew in length, and the Ainslee Series was issued in book form. This comprised "Ainslee," "Grandpa's House," "Four and What They Did" and " White and Red." They were popular, and all of them were reprinted in England. Her next works were Six Sinners, His Grandmothers and The American Girl's Hand-book of Work and Play.

=== Social and industrial reformer ===
In 1878, Campbell was a teacher in North Carolina at the Raleigh Cooking School. About 1882, she became literary and household editor of Our Continent, and wrote for its pages the popular novel entitled Under Green Apple Boughs, followed by the What-to-do-Club. These latter books were preceded by several others, entitled Unto the Third and Fourth Generation, and The Easiest Way in Housekeeping and Cooking.

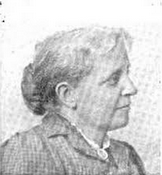
Helen Campbell

Problem of the Poor, which gave an impetus to much work along the same lines by other writers, began Campbell's special interest in the poor. This appeared in 1880 and drew great attention toward plans for alleviating the miseries of the ignorant and impoverished in New York City. Some of the conclusions reached by Campbell appeared in her novel, Mrs. Herndon's Income, which was printed first as a serial in the Christian Union, and was afterward issued in book form. This powerful book at once lifted Campbell to an important place as a novelist, while her thrilling story won the attention of philanthropists and reformers the world over.

From 1881 until 1884, Campbell was literary editor of the Continent, published in Philadelphia, and in 1889, she assumed charge of a department in the Springfield, Massachusetts, Good Housekeeping, entitled "Woman's Work and Wages." This led to a productive line of inquiry into women working outside of the home. In 1891, Campbell received a prize from the American Economic Association for a monograph upon "Women Wage-Earners." Women Wage-Earners was later expanded for publication in 1893 and came to be known as "the first major statistical monograph on the situation of American women working for wages".

In 1886, attracted by Mrs. Herndon's Income, the New York Tribune appointed her its commissioner to investigate the condition of women wage-earners in New York, and that work resulted in a series of papers under the title of "Prisoners of Poverty," which caused a profound and widespread sensation respecting the life of wage-women in the metropolis. It may be regarded as the seed from which followed a vast amount of literature upon the topic, resulting in great amelioration in the condition of a large body of workers.

In 1894, she was appointed professor of household economics in the school of sociology at the University of Wisconsin, and this chair she continued to fill until 1897, when she accepted a call to the State Agricultural College of Kansas. Her 1897 work, Household Economics was compiled from a course of lectures which she delivered at the university.

Soon afterwards, Campbell went abroad to investigate the lives of wage-earners in London, Paris, Italy and Germany. There, she remained 18 months or more, the fruits of her work appearing, upon her return to the United States, in Prisoners of Poverty Abroad. Following that she published: Miss Melinda's Opportunity and Roger Berkley's Probation, two short novels; Anne Bradstreet and Her Time, a biography of the 17th century colonial American poet Anne Bradstreet.; and, A Sylvan City, a historical study of life in Philadelphia. A later published work of Campbell's, Darkness and Daylight in New York, was a series of graphic portraitures of the salient features of the city.

She also worked as a professor of economics at the University of Wisconsin (1893–96), professor of domestic science at Kansas State Agricultural College (1896–97), and was the head resident in Chicago's Unity Settlement.

== Influence and reception ==
From the first, Campbell's writings were of a philanthropic and domestic character. She becoming an earnest student of economic and social problems, especially in connection with the conditions of laboring women. She wrote several important studies about women trapped in poverty, and the role that effective home economics could play in lifting women and families out of poverty. Her writings had a recognized position among economic works. They demonstrated a thorough study of her subjects, and were thoughtful and sympathetic, though generally more of a popular than a scientific or thoroughly exhaustive character. Campbell contributed many articles on economic subjects to reviews and magazines. She wrote novels and nonfiction works dealing with home economics and relationships between the individual, the home, the workplace, physical well-being, and childhood. She was active in many organizations that advocated female empowerment and associated with many intellectuals and original thinkers, including writer Charlotte Perkins Gilman. Much of her writing was engaging and vigorous. Her pieces exposed Gilded Age social inequities and public health failures.

The "Critic" said, in 1887, of Campbell's Prisoners of Poverty: "Her book is devoted chiefly to statement and fact; not to the suggestion of remedies. She reinforces our consciousness that the final remedy lies farther back than in mere increase of wages or division of profits." In 1897, "The Bookman" of New York, said of Household Economics: "It is fascinating in style, teems with epigrams, and abounds in truths which it behooves women to consider. The spirit of the lectures is one of delightful idealism."

== Personal life ==
She married Dr. Grenville Mellen Weeks (born 1837), physician and soldier, in 1859 or 1860. In 1871, the marriage floundered, and eventually they divorced. He remarried twice thereafter.

Campbell was a member of the Sorosis Club of New York, the American Economic Association, the Consumers' League and the Pacific Coast Women's Press Association. For a major part of her life, she made her home was in New York City. In her later days, she became a devotee of the Baháʼí Faith, spending time at one of its institutions, Green Acre, in Eliot, Maine. By 1915, she was in Boston, and she spent her later days in Dedham, Massachusetts, where she died of endocarditis and nephritis in 1918. Her remains were taken to Eliot.

== Selected works ==
* 1864–67, Ainslee Series
- 1877, His Grandmothers
- 1878, Six Sinners
- 1880, Unto the Third and Fourth Generation. A study
- 1880, Four, and what they did, etc. [With illustrations.]
- 1880, The Easiest Way in Housekeeping and Cooking: Adapted to Domestic Use, or Study in Classes
- 1881, Patty Pearson's Boy: A Tale of Two Generations
- 1882, The Problem of the Poor: A Record of Quiet Work in Unquiet Places
- 1882, Under Green Apple Boughs
- 1883, The American Girl's Home-Book of Work and Play
- 1883, Mrs. Herndon's Income
- 1885, Harry's Winter with the Indians, or, White and Red. With ... Illustrations
- 1885, The What-to-Do Club: A Story for Girls
- 1885, Katy's Adventures at Grandpa's House. With ... Illustrations
- 1886, Miss Melinda's Opportunity
- 1888, The Housekeeper's Year-Book
- 1888, Roger Berkeley's Probation
- 1888, Prisoners of Poverty Abroad
- 1889, Prisoners of Poverty: Women Wage-Workers, their Trades and their Lives (online edition)
- 1891, Anne Bradstreet and Her Time
- 1891, Darkness and Daylight; or, Lights and Shadows of New York Life
- 1893, Women Wage-Earners: Their Past, their Present, and their Future
- 1894, In Foreign Kitchens
- 1895, Some Passages in the Practice of Dr. Martha Scarborough
- 1897, Household Economics

== Gallery ==
The Ainslee stories

Ballantyne - a novel

The easiest way in housekeeping and cooking

Good dinners for every day in the year

Grandpa's house

Household economics; a course of lectures in the School of economics of the University of Wisconsin

The housekeeper's year-book

In foreign kitchens - with choice recipes from England, France, Germany, Italy, and the North

Prisoners of poverty abroad

Six sinners; or, School days in Bantam Valley

Women wage-earners- their past, their present and their future
