= Mary C. F. Hall-Wood =

American poet

Mary Camilla Foster Hall-Wood
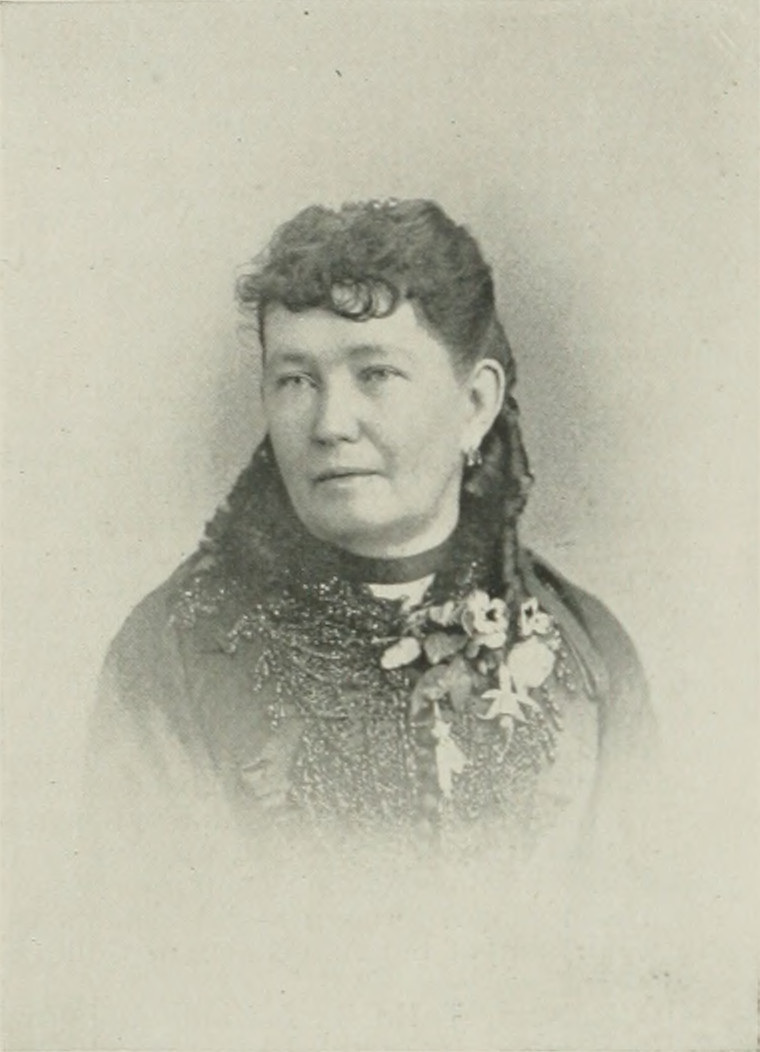
- Photo in A Woman of the Century
- Born: Mary Camilla Foster; 1842/3; New York City, U.S.
- Died: December 14, 1899; Santa Barbara, California, U.S.
- Occupations: poet; editor; author
- Spouses: Bradley Hall; Edward Nelson Wood
- Writing career
- Pen name: "Camilla K. Von K."
- Notable work: Sea Leaves

Mary C. F. Hall-Wood (née, Foster; pen name, Camilla K. Von K.; 1842/3 - December 14, 1899) was a 19th-century American poet, editor, and author. Her Sea Leaves was published in 1887. She was the editor of the Santa Barbara, California Index, later renamed The Independent. She was a committee member of the Pacific Coast Women's Press Association.

== Early life ==
Mary Camilla Foster was born in New York City, in 1842/3.

== Career ==
At an early age, she married Bradley Hall, a young lawyer. Migrating with him to California, they settled in San Rafael, California. He became district attorney of Marin County, California, and was rapidly rising in his profession when he died, leaving her financially well-off, with an only son.

Removing to Santa Barbara, California in 1871, which subsequently been her home, she then married Dr. Edward Nelson Wood, a journalist of Troy, New York. He attended Middlebury College for two years before studying medicine at Washington, D.C. He appreciated her poetic gifts and encouraged her to write for the press. Her first poem was published in a Santa Barbara journal in 1872. Along with A. W. Sefton, they established the Santa Barbara Index in the fall of 1872, but her husband's health was failing, and he died in Santa Barbara, October 14, 1874.

Widowed, her husband's long illness and unfortunate investments having dissipated her savings, Hall-Wood found herself with the necessity of making a living for herself and son. After several ups and downs, absorbing in turn the Democrat and Advertiser, in 1878, the Index changed its name to The Independent. In May 1883, the Independent Publishing Company commenced the publication of the Daily Independent. Both daily and weekly editions remained in the same hands, with G. P. Tebbetts as manager, and Hall-Wood as editor. The paper was independent in politics, advocating the interests of the people. Hall-Wood's writing under the pen name of "Camilla K. von K." attracted much attention by its freshness and originality. She wrote poetry for her own amusement and the pleasure of her readers when she felt inspired. Hall-Wood held the position for nine years, (Note: According to the Oakland Tribute (1890), Hall-Wood edited the Daily Independent for eleven years.) until ill health caused her to retire from her desk.

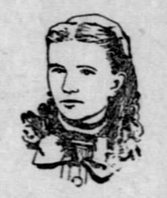
1889

Her only volume, Sea Leaves, was published from her office in 1887. The book received much attention from the press, and some of the poems were translated into French. Although never regularly placed upon the market, it was a financial as well as a literary success. She used the pen name "Camilla K. Von K.", but was also known by her full name, "Mary C. F. Hall-Wood". According to a review by the San Francisco Chronicle (1888):–

"The little volume covers a wide range, but many of the poems reflect the life of Southern California and have a pronounced local flavor that makes them interesting to anyone who has ever lived on this coast. The author shows unusual skill in the command of various meters and it will be a captious reader who cannot find something here to his taste."

== Death ==
Hall-Wood had been an invalid for several years before she died in Santa Barbara, December 14, 1899, of hemorrhage of the stomach at the age of 57 years.

== Selected works ==
- Sea Leaves, 1887
