= Ada Henry Van Pelt =

American journalist

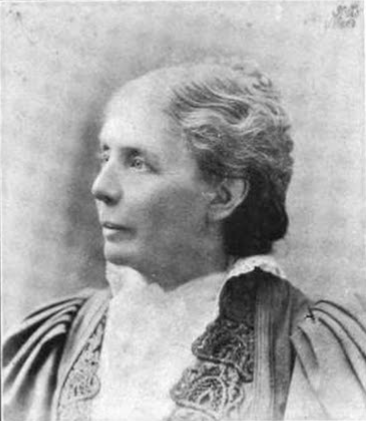
Van Pelt, circa 1903

Ada Henry Van Pelt (1838 – August 7, 1923) was a temperance and suffrage activist, editor, lecturer, and, later in life, an inventor. She held several patents, including one for an electric water purifier, patented when she was 74 years old.

== Early life ==
Ada Henry Van Pelt was born in Princeton, Kentucky in 1838. The events of the Civil War shaped Ada's life from an early age. Her brother, Colonel A.P Henry, was the commander of the 15th Kentucky Cavalry regiment. Her husband Captain Charles E. Van Pelt, whom she married in 1864, commanded the 48th Kentucky Volunteer Mounted Infantry Regiment. Her father, Major C.B Henry, owes the protection of his fortunes from raiders to Ada. She hid her father's savings from his career in banking in her hoop-skirt when she heard the Confederates were coming to their area, hiding these savings in their house and protecting it from the looters. She was a temperance and suffrage activist as well. For six years, she was a main writer and editor of the Pacific Ensign, and also served as the President of the Pacific Coast Women's Press Association. She went on many speaking tours, lecturing on her time working with the Red Cross during the Spanish-American War. After the end of the Civil War, Ada and her husband relocated to Nebraska, where she helped found the Lincoln City Libraries and was their first Librarian. After his death in 1889, she moved to California.

== Career ==
Ada Henry Van Pelt was an avid innovator, often dubbed "The Woman Edison" for her many genius inventions. After she moved to California, her energy was directed towards her many inventions: the first of which earned the US Patent #420,841. She designed a sophisticated permutation lock capable of three thousand combinations that was used for doors, jewel-cases, and post-office lock boxes. Under the U.S. Patent #471,918 she created a letter box for homes, which notified the postal service workers if there was a letter in the mailbox to collect. She also created an odorless, smokeless, and noiseless oil burner in 1902 with William A. Laufman, which was filed under U.S. Patent #724,761A.

=== Steam engine ===
When Ada was living in Oakland, California, she was constantly using the ferry to cross San Francisco Bay. She noticed that the popular fly-wheel mechanism on the ferry was losing a substantial amount of power, causing inefficiencies in the engine and therefore the ferry's travel. So, over ten years, working in secret in a sewing room, Ada built a highly efficient mechanism using a weighted, oscillating beam with swinging pendants that was much more efficient than the current fly-wheel. She faced heaps of critique at the time, specifically from her male peers. They argued that if such inventions were possible, they would have already been created by the men, and most certainly not a woman, who specialized in this field. Yet after her patent (U.S. Patent #1,002,610A), inventors marveled at her seemingly simple principle that worked so efficiently.

=== Water purifier ===
Additionally, Ada patented two inventions related to water purification. She desired to create a small, handheld, readily usable device that could filter and purify water in the same device that could easily be plugged into an outlet, as the inventions at the time either were too large, expensive, or did not filter and purify water in the same apparatus. She utilized hydrolysis, where electricity is used to turn water (H_{2}O) into oxygen (O_{2}) and hydrogen gas (H_{2}). Humphry Davy, a renowned British chemist, had previously employed hydrolysis using a voltaic pile to isolate many substances, such as potassium, magnesium, and sodium in 1807. However, this method was neither cost effective or practical for home use. So, Ada filed the U.S. Patent #1,020,001 in 1911, which was a device that was capable of holding three gallons of water, combining the filtration and purification of water using hydrolysis. She further improved on this invention in 1913 with U.S. Patent #1,057,367, which was revised for even more easy use and domestic applications. Her patents were still cited up until the late 1990s, and the popularity of at-home water filters have skyrocketed. Now, consumers have numerous options of at-home water filtration and purification systems: UV light, electrolysis, semi-permeable membranes, etc. Electrolysis as a water purification and filtration method is currently being investigated on a wider scale to see if it can treat flood water in dveleping countries, use the hydrogen created as byproduct as fuel, and to treat sewerage.

== Late life ==
In 1912, Ada Henry Van Pelt was named an honorary member of the French Academy of Science for her innovative contributions. She continued to lecture and participate in the Ebell Club, a women's nonprofit in Los Angeles that held performances, classrooms, and meeting rooms. Van Pelt died on August 7, 1923, at the age of 85.
