= Nellie Blessing Eyster =

American journalist, writer, lecturer and social reformer

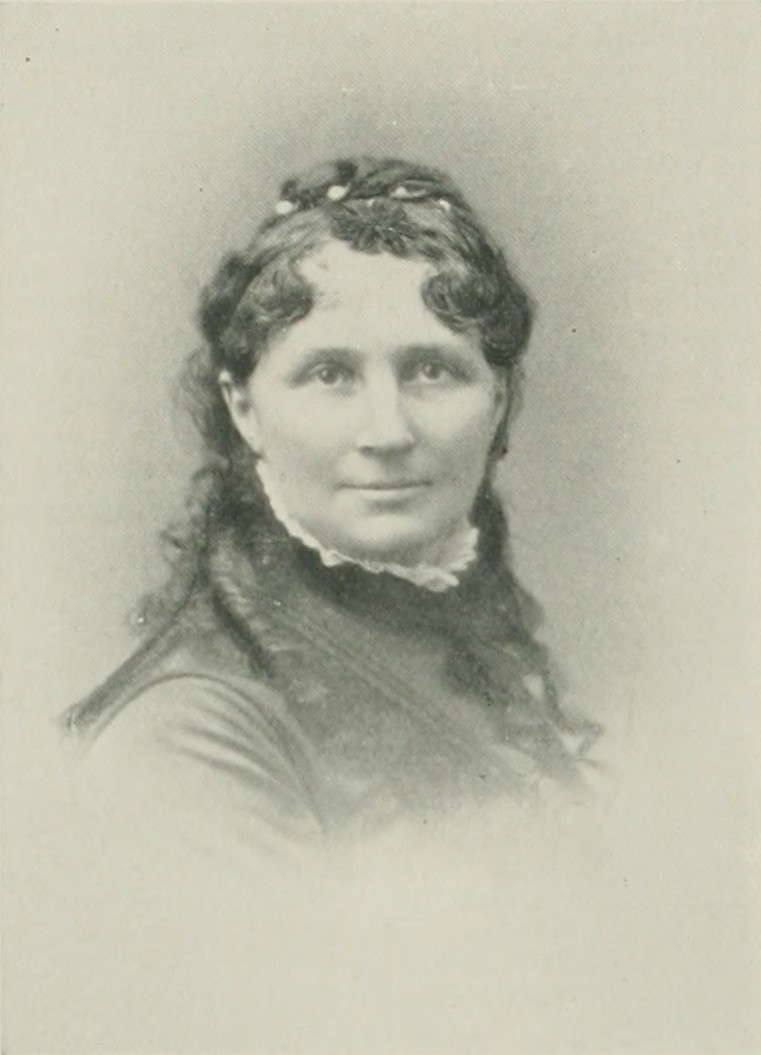
- Photo in A Woman of the Century
- Born: Penelope Ann Margaret Blessing; December 7, 1836; Frederick, Maryland, U.S.
- Died: February 21, 1922 (aged 85); Berkeley, California, U.S.
- Other name: "Nellie"
- Education: Barleywood Seminary
- Occupations: Journalist, writer, lecturer, and social reformer
- Spouse: David A. S. Eyster (m. 1853)
- Children: 2

Nellie Blessing Eyster (née, Blessing; December 7, 1836 – February 21, 1922) was an American journalist, writer, lecturer, and social reformer. She assisted In the purchase of Mount Vernon (George Washington's home) for the U.S.; and served as an officer of the Great Sanitary Commission during the American Civil War. Eyster's teaching extended to California's Chinese immigrants; she was also a teacher of music, rhetoric and belles lettres in various seminaries; and was a state lecturer on scientific temperance in colleges and public schools. She was State President of Juvenile Work of the Woman's Christian Temperance Union (WCTU) of California, president of the California Women's Indian Association, and president emeritus of the League of American Pen Women. Eyster was the first President of the Pacific Coast Women's Press Association.

== Early life and education ==
Penelope Ann Margaret Blessing was born in Frederick, Maryland, December 7, 1836. Her parents were Abraham and Mary M. E. Blessing. Her ancestry included Huguenot and Anglo-Saxon background. On her maternal side, she was a granddaughter of Captain George W. Ent, a commander at Fort McHenry in the war of 1812 and a friend of Francis Scott Key. Abraham Blessing, Eyster's father, who died when she was 10 years old, was the youngest brother of George Blessing of Maryland, who served during the American Civil War, and was known as, "The Hero of the Highlands." She was a grand-niece of Barbara Fritchie. "Nellie" was the eldest of the five children.

Eyster was educated by private tutors and at Barleywood Seminary, Virginia. She showed literary ability at an early age.

== Career ==
Eyster's first work was assisting with the purchase of Mt. Vernon, and she was active in the Sanitary Commission during the Civil War. She became a newspaper correspondent and wrote reminiscences of the war and its notable people for Harper's Magazine. She wrote for California journals, including stories for the Overland and Illustrated Californian. She was associated with Gail Hamilton in the editing of Wood's Magazine, and was also the editor of the Pacific Ensign, the organ of the State WCTU.

Her first book, Sunny Hours of the Child Life of Tom and Mary, received the endorsement of Oliver Wendell Holmes. In 1870, she published "A Dame of the Quakers" in Harper's Magazine, and later, "How the Star Spangled Banner Found Its Tune". After moving to San Jose, California, she wrote The Colonial Boy, which was published in 1890 and was adopted by most of the school and church libraries in the United States. A Chinese Quaker, published in 1902, was quoted as introducing a valuable history of the Chinese immigration in San Francisco; it attracted wide attention in Europe and the Orient. Other books included, Chincapin Charlie, On the Wing, and Tom Harding and His Friends. She wrote for the New-York Tribune and Riverside Magazine; and edited with Gail Hamilton.

Active in woman suffrage and other movements for the advancement of women, her temperance lectures on the subject of the "House Beautiful and the Man Wonderful" made her well known. She also served as California state lecturer in public schools on scientific temperance.

She was president of the San Jose Ladies Benevolent Society, president of the California Women's Indian Association, first president of the Pacific Coast Women's Press Association, State President of Juvenile Work of the WCTU of California, and president emeritus of the League of American Pen Women. She was also secretary of the Woman's Missionary Society of the Presbyterian Church, and treasurer of the Political Equality Club of Berkeley, California.

== Personal life ==
In 1853, when she was 16 years old, she married her private tutor, David A. S. Eyster, a young lawyer of, Harrisburg, Pennsylvania. They had one daughter, Mary, born a year after the marriage, and one son, who died at the age of 10, in 1872. David was employed as a financial clerk of the Pennsylvania State Board of Education. The death of the son and her mother the following year caused Eyster's health to fail. In 1876, the family moved from Harrisburg, Pennsylvania, to San Jose, California, which helped Eyster rally from her depression and regain interest in religious and benevolent work. In Pennsylvania, the family had been members of the English Lutheran Church, but in San Jose, they became connected with the Presbyterian denomination, and Eyster was linked with some of its enterprises.

In 1900, after the death of the husband, Eyster moved to San Francisco to live with her daughter, Mary A. Elder. Her grandson, Paul Elder, became a San Francisco publisher and bookseller. She died at the home of her daughter at Berkeley, California, on February 21, 1922.

== Selected works ==
- 1867, Sunny Hour Stories. Chincapin Charlie ... Illustrated by George G. White
- 1867, On the wing
- 1866, Chincapin Charlie
- 1867, Sunny hours, or, Child life of Tom and Mary
- 1870, Robert Brent's three Christmas days
- 1874, Tom Harding and his friends
- 1899, A colonial boy; or, The treasures of an old link closet
- 1902, A Chinese Quaker : an unfictitious novel
- 1905, Older than Adam; the wonderful petrified forest of California
- 1909, A Noted mother and daughter
- 1912, Friends with Lincoln in the White House
- 1912, A beautiful life : memoir of Mrs. Eliza Nelson Fryer, 1847-1910
