= The Pacific Ensign =

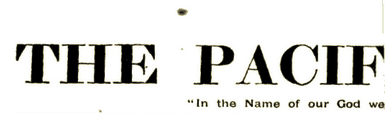
masthead (1891)

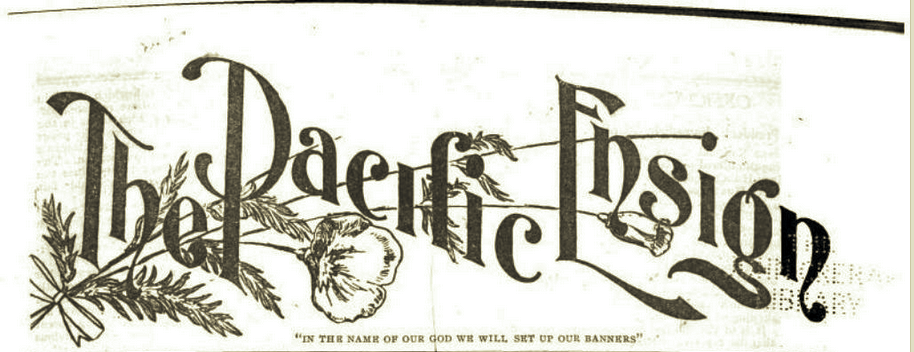
masthead (January 1904)

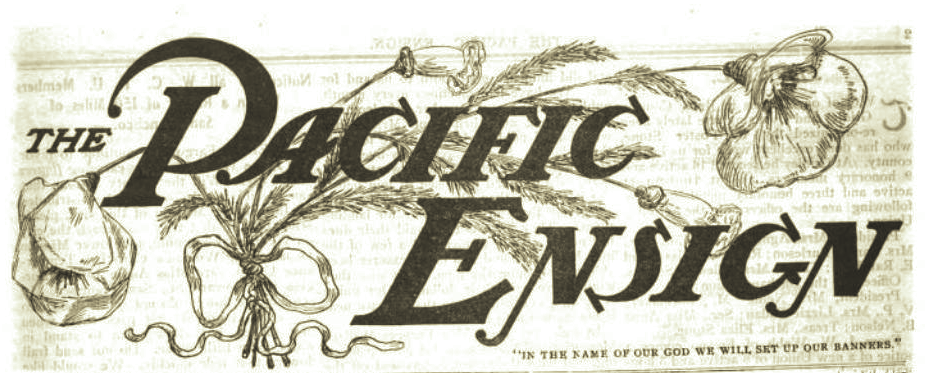
masthead (April 1904)

The Pacific Ensign (previously, Bulletin and Pharos) was the official organ of the California Woman's Christian Temperance Union. Previously known as the Bulletin (1885–88) and Pharos (1888–91), it was published by the Ensign Publishing Company on McAlister Street in San Francisco, from 1891 till 1906.

At the time, California published five or more well supported temperance papers, three of which were owned by the W.C.T.U.. Of these, the Pacific Ensign was the State organ and the others were county-based. The Pacific Ensign served as a record and distributor of the work of the California W.C.T.U. The 8-page weekly was published on Thursdays; it measured 10 by 14 inches (250 mm × 360 mm).

== Notable people ==
Dorcas James Spencer served as business manager of the Ensign Publishing Company. Editors included Emily Pitts Stevens, who edited all three namesakes of the State organ, as well as Nellie Blessing Eyster, Ada Henry Van Pelt, and Clare O. Southard.
