= Alice Kingsbury Cooley =

British-born American actress, author and poet

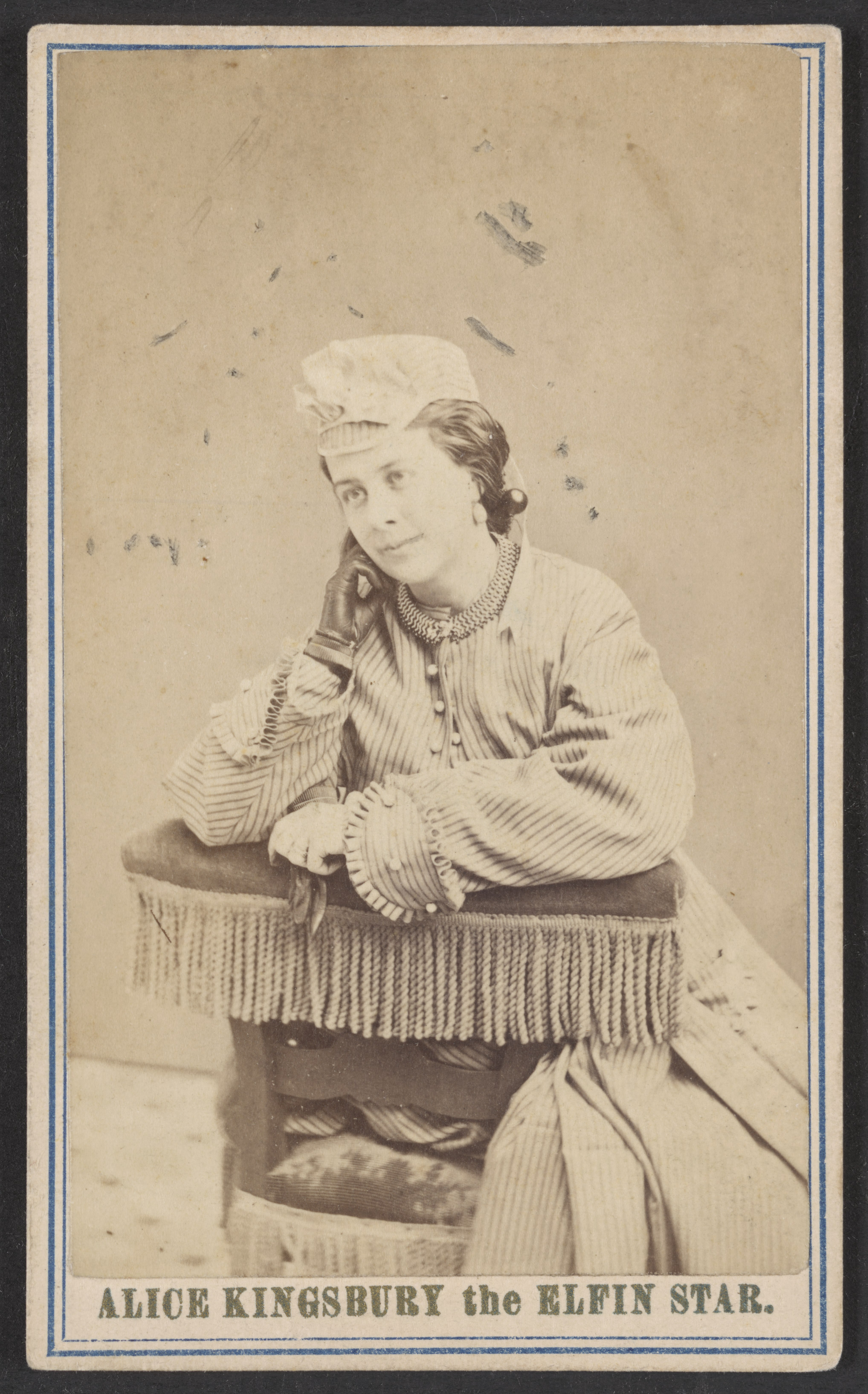
- Alice Kingsbury, by J. W. Winder & Co.
- Born: Alice Madeline James; December 31, 1840; Bristol, England
- Died: November 3, 1910 (aged 69); Alameda, California, U.S.
- Occupations: actress; writer
- Spouses: Horace Kingsbury; Francis M. Cooley
- Children: 12

Alice Kingsbury Cooley (née James; after first marriage, Kingsbury; after second marriage, Cooley; 1839–1910) was a British-born American actress, author, and poet of New York City. She starred in stage plays in the U.S. and Canada. At first, she was known in San Francisco as a soubrette playing Fanchon, the Cricket; then later, as the mother of twelve children, who wrote books to fill up her time. Her literary works, under the name Alice Kingsbury, included novel, dramas, and children's literature. Kingsbury was a member of the Pacific Coast Women's Press Association.

== Early life and education ==
Alice Madeline James was born December 31, 1840, in Bristol, England. Her parents were David Hawes James and Harriet (Bird) James. She came to the U.S. with her parents in 1850, the family settling in Cincinnati, Ohio.

Her parents were Quakers, her father an accountant, and her mother an artist. Mr. James, after reaching the age of 65, began the study of medicine, and for several years thereafter, was a successful physician with a considerable practice. Mrs. James painted in oil and water colors. The family consisted of three boys aud four girls, Alice being the youngest. A sister who married the school principal, B. O. M. DeBeck.

She received her education in the public schools of Cincinnati and Covington, Kentucky. She studied music and had a good singing voice.

== Career ==
=== Theater ===
Within two years after her marriage, she went upon the stage, making her first appearance at the Old National Theatre in Cincinnati as "Bianca, The Italian Wife." She herself was a young mother at the time with an eight-month-old baby. She became a well-known member of the city's Pike's Opera House Company. A decided hit in Cincinnati, in the ten years succeeding, she followed her stage career in various parts of the country.

During the civil war, she played in the Confederate States of America, and had many experiences. She was in Nashville, Tennessee on the day it was attacked and in another Southern town where bullets were shot over her head. She met Gov. Andrew Johnson (afterwards President) in the Tennessee State Capitol, and was introduced to him.

In 1866, she came to California on a mission to find her brother. Some years before, a brother had left home for California, and because he had not been heard from, he was supposed by all the famity to be dead. At Madison, Wisconsin, on July 4, 1866, Kingsbury had been invited to read the Declaration of Independence, and by some blunder, John E. Murdoch was present for the same purpose. Kingsubry resigned the task to Murdoch, and at the same time, met Judge Stidger, an old Californian, who, upon learning of her brother's disappearance, at once remembered having seen him at a recent date in Sacramento, alive and well. Some correspondence ensued, and a month later, Kingsbury left for California, engaged by Tom Maguire's New York agent to play a ten-night engagement, the character of which was not stipulated, but presumably in minor characters.

Kingsbury won considerable fame in San Francisco. At Thomas Maguire's theater in Washington Street, between Kearny Street and Montgomery Street, Kingsbury appeared in popular plays of the period, including Fanchon the Cricket (dramatization of Charles Dickens 's The Cricket on the Hearth) and Tetula, the Child of the Savannah. The story of her debut as "Fanchon", following closely upon the appearance of Maggie Mitchell, in her notable rendition of the character, and the astounding success of Kingsbury, drawing crowds for 36 successive nights, became well-known in San Francisco.

Characterized as a bright soubrette, the darling of the public. she played throughout the U.S. and Canada in various roles, including Fanchon, Juliette, Cupid at Play, and Sleeping Bacchus. Kingsubry won distinction in Shakespeare's plays. John McCullough was the leading man in her company and later, he played Hamlet to her Ophelia, Romeo to her Juliet, and Othello to her Desdemona. In these roles, she traveled the country, the tour being a theatrical triumph at the time.

In 1868, Kingsbury, then a widow, determined to go to Italy to study sculpture. First, she visited her sister at Natchez, Mississippi, where she met Colonel Frank M. Cooley of the U.S. Army. They were married on July 28, 1869. He was the commander of the Army post at Natchez.

About 1876, she returned to San Francisco to make it her permanent home.

She retired from the stage in 1890. Later in life, she was given a benefit at which she played her old role of "Fanchon," and one of her sons took the part of the stern father Barbeauld.

=== Writer ===
Ho! for elf-land!

Cooley was a well known writer of prose and verse and had several volumes of her writings published. About 1870, her first story and some letters were published in The Golden Era. She wrote a children's bock called: Ho! for Elf-Land, which sold two thousand copies in San Francisco;, and was illustrated by herself. Her series of sketches, titled Secrets Told, included sarcasm on social questions. It failed to find a larger readership because it dealt unmercifully with masculine shortcomings, and was deemed a dangerous book to be read by wives. Asaph was an historical novel of ancient Jerusalem. It was republished under the title When Jeremiah Prophesied (Alliance Library).

In 1904, she issued a book of verses under the caption Cricket's Chirpings (Owl Press, San Francisco). The volume was notable mainly for its optimism; the poems were songs of hope and faith. Some years prior, she published a romance of Persian life that ran into several editions. She also wrote several plays, during her theatrical career, notably The Little Rag-Picker and Maud, the Chimney Sweep's Daughter.

=== Sculptor ===
After she retired to domestic life, raising a family, she modeled small shapes in clay, which were put into plaster. She modeled a bust of General Robert E. Lee.

== Personal life ==
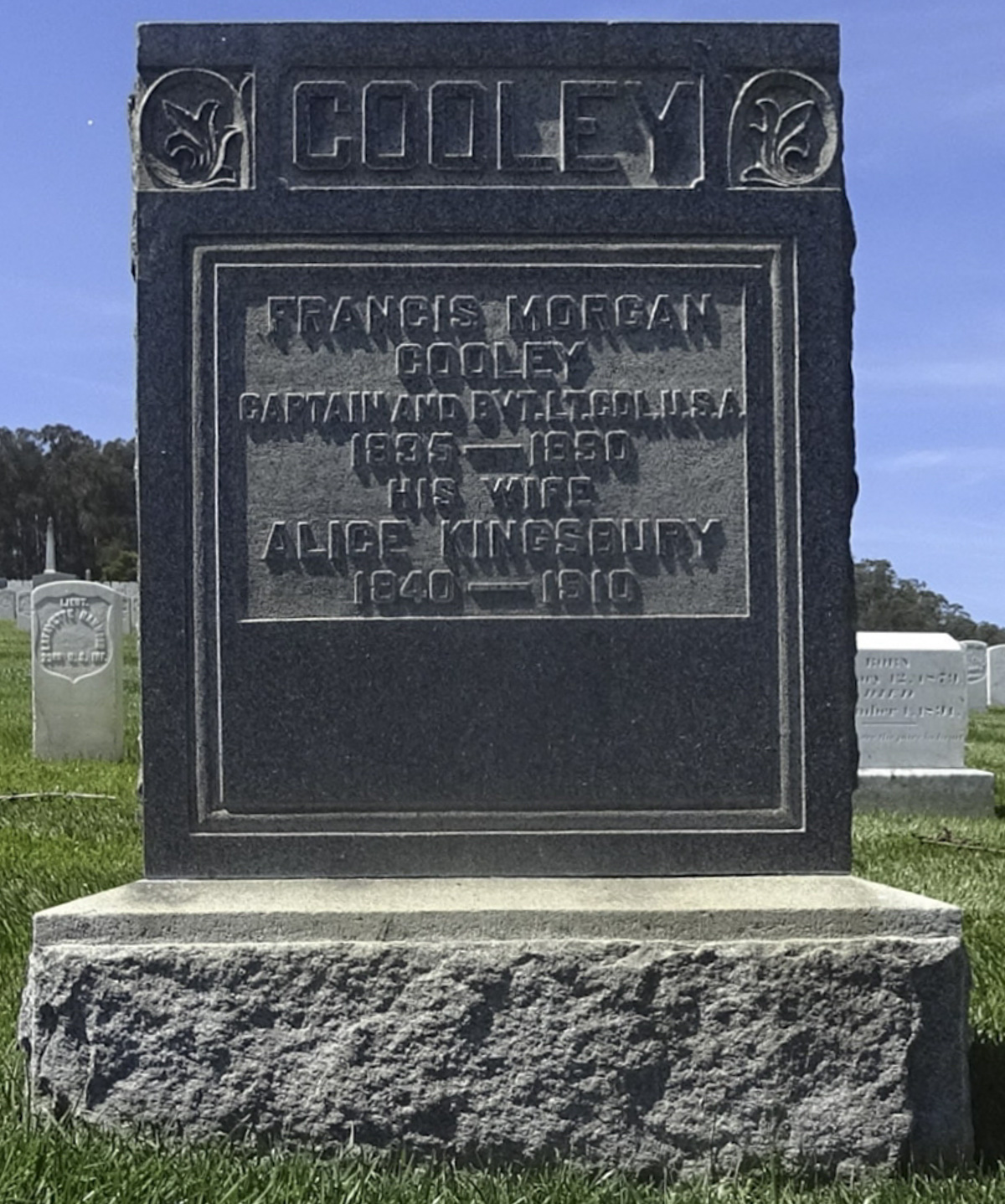
Grave of Francis Morgan Cooley and Alice Kingsbury

She left school at the age of 17, to marry Horace D. Kingsbury, a watch-maker and flute player. She became a stepmother to his three children. Horace and Alice had four children.

She married secondly Francis M. Cooley. They had eight children including Frank Cooley, the actor, Earl Cooley, president of the San Francisco Galvanizing works; V. V. Cooley of Yuba City, California; Edward Cooley of Los Angeles; and Mrs. Sallie McKean of Alameda. She was widowed a second time by 1889 when she was living in Seattle, Washington.

Alice Kingsbury Cooley died at her home in Alameda, California, November 3, 1910, the result of ptomaine poisoning.

== Selected works ==
- Did she sin? an original and exciting drama in 5 acts. (Natchez, Miss., 1873)
- Ho! for Elf-land! (San Francisco, A. L. Bancroft & Company, 1878) (text)
- Secrets Told: With Twenty-Two Piquant Illustrations From Life (San Francisco, Alta California Printing House, 1879) (text)
- Asaph: An Historical Novel (New York, United States Book Company, 1890) (text)
- Cricket's Chirpings (San Francisco, Owl Press, 1904)
