= Virna Woods =

American author and playwright

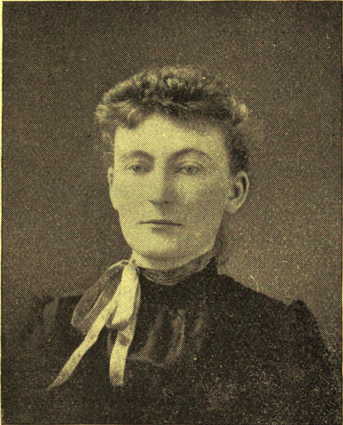
- Born: April 26, 1864; Wilmington
- Died: March 6, 1903 (aged 38); Sacramento
- Occupation: Writer

Virna Woods (April 26, 1864 – March 6, 1903) was an American author, poet, and playwright.

Virna Woods was born on April 26, 1864 in Wilmington, Ohio, the daughter of John Brookins Woods and Virginia Alice Pidgeon. She was raised in Zanesville, Ohio. She relocated to California in 1883 and worked as a schoolteacher in Sacramento, California.

Most of her work is set in California. Her novels include Jason Hildreth's Identity, which appeared in Lippincott's Monthly in 1897.

She created a stage adaptation of Strathmore by Ouida, produced in San Francisco in 1903 starring Virginia Drew Trescott.

Virna Woods died of pneumonia on March 6, 1903, in Sacramento.

== Bibliography ==
- The Amazons: A Lyrical Drama (1891)
- A Modern Magdalen (1894)
- An Elusive Lover (1898)
