= Elizabeth Chamberlain =

Elizabeth Chamberlain may refer to:

- Elizabeth Carey, Lady Berkeley (1576–1635), second married name Elizabeth Chamberlain
- Elizabeth Chamberlain Gibson (1830–1916), née Elizabeth Chamberlain

== See also ==
- Beth Chamberlin, actress
