= Clara Elizabeth Chan Lee =

First Chinese American woman to register to vote in the US

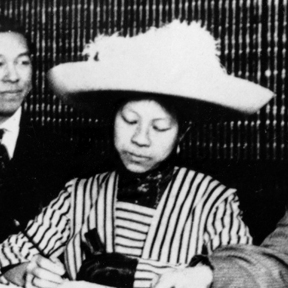
- Lee in 1911
- Born: October 21, 1886; Portland, Oregon
- Died: October 5, 1993 (aged 106); Alameda, California

Clara Elizabeth Chan Lee (October 21, 1886 – October 5, 1993) was the first Chinese American woman to register to vote in the United States. She registered to vote on November 8, 1911, in California following the passage of Proposition 4 in California, nine years before the passage of the Nineteenth Amendment to the United States Constitution.

== Political activities ==
Lee registered to vote at the Alameda County courthouse on November 8, 1911.

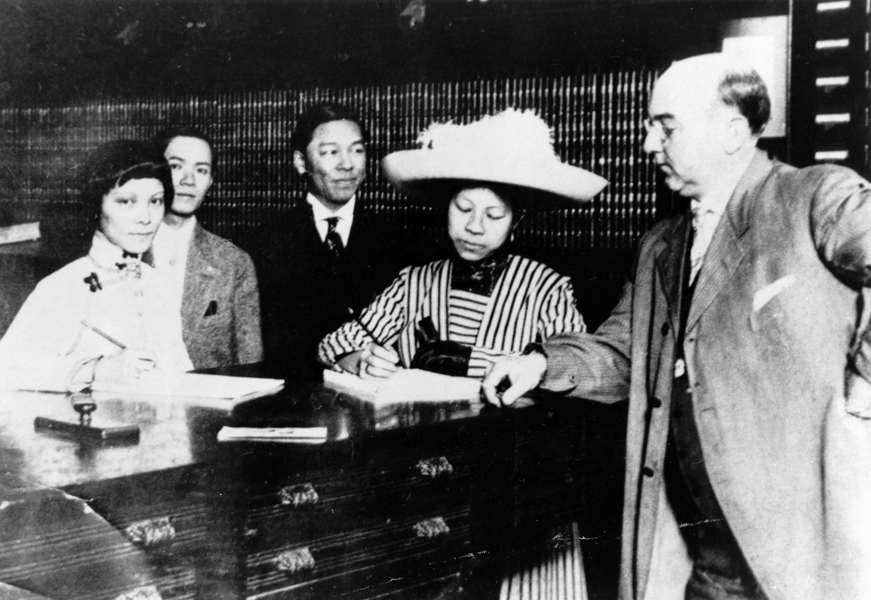
Clara Elizabeth Chan Lee registering in 1911, together with Emma Tom Leung (left), while their husbands stand behind them.

Lee was a founder of the Chinese Women's Jeleab (self reliance) Association, created in 1913. The association promoted women's rights in both the U.S. and China. She was a member of the YWCA and the Fidelis Coterie club.

== Personal life ==
Clara Elizabeth (Yee Miew) Chan was born October 21, 1886, in Portland, Oregon. She was the daughter of the Methodist Reverend Chan Hon Fun (Chan Hon Fan) and Ow Muck Gay. The Rev. Chan Hon Fun was the pastor of the Chinese Community Methodist Church of Oakland in Oakland Chinatown from 1900 to 1909. Lee was married to Charles Goodall Lee, the first licensed Chinese American dentist in the United States. She died October 5, 1993, in Alameda, California, and is interred in Oakland.

== Honors ==
The East Bay Asian Local Development Corporation has named an affordable housing structure after Clara Elizabeth Chan Lee, located in Oakland, California

== See also ==
- List of democracy and elections-related topics
- List of suffragists and suffragettes
- Timeline of women's suffrage in California
- Women's suffrage
- Women's suffrage in California
