= Kanichi Miyama =

- 美山貫一
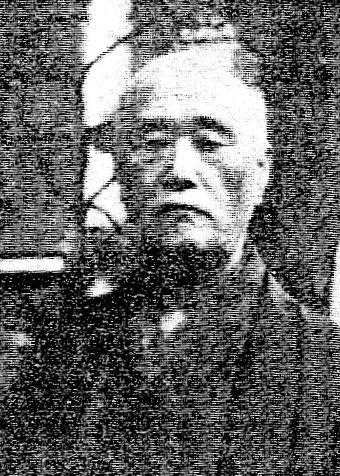
- Born: December 2, 1847; Chōshū domain
- Died: July 29, 1936 (aged 88); Kamakura
- Occupation: Christian minister

Kanichi Miyama (美山 貫一, Miyama Kanichi; December 2, 1847 – July 29, 1936) was a Japanese Christian minister.

== Early life ==
Miyama was born Naito Kyojiro on December 2, 1847, in Chōshū domain, Nagato province, Japan. He was the second son in a samurai family. He later became the successor to the Miyama family, and changed his name to Kanichi Miyama in 1871. He attended military schools for much of his life, but after failing the Imperial Japanese Naval Academy, he got a job at the Ministry of the Army. He then started a business, and after it failed he decided to go to the United States in 1875.

== Career ==
Miyama arrived in San Francisco in 1875. After hearing a sermon given by Otis Gibson, he converted to Christianity and was baptized by Merriman Colbert Harris. He became a minister in 1884 and began officially assisting Gibson with the Japanese congregation, which became the first Japanese Methodist church in the United States. Miyama also became the first president of the Fukuinkai, also known as the Japanese Gospel Society. When he returned to Japan in 1885, he founded branches of the organization in Tokyo and Yokohama. Miyama was ordained as a deacon and then went to Hawaii in 1887, where he founded the Honolulu Japanese church. It was the first Japanese Christian Church in Hawaii, and later split into the Nuuanu Congregational Church and the Harris Methodist Church. Miyama and Consul General Taro Ando also founded the Japanese Mutual Aid Association, which was later called the Japanese Benevolent Society.

Miyama returned to Japan again in 1890 and founded the Nagoya Methodist Church. He transferred to a church in Ginza in April 1893. Finally, he transferred again in March 1896 to Kamakura, where he founded the Kamakura Methodist Church in 1903. He retired in 1920. He lived in Kamakura until his death on July 29, 1936.
