= East Bay Asian Local Development Corporation =

- Abbreviation: EBALDC
- Formation: 1975
- Type: Non-profit community development corporation
- Purpose: Affordable housing, neighborhood revitalization, community development
- Headquarters: 1825 San Pablo Avenue, Suite 200, Oakland, California, United States
- Region served: East Bay, California
- Key people: Andy M. Madeira (CEO)
- Website: https://ebaldc.org/

The East Bay Asian Local Development Corporation (EBALDC) is a non-profit community development corporation based in Oakland, California, focused on affordable housing and community development.

EBALDC has contributed to the creation and preservation of over 2,000 housing units in the East Bay. The organization also provides financial literacy education, workforce training, and tax assistance programs for local residents.

EBALDC has been involved in affordable housing development projects across Oakland and the East Bay, including a 65-unit housing development supported by state funding. One of its projects is a 97-unit affordable housing development, the Clara E. Chan Lee Residences, located near the Lake Merritt BART station in Oakland, developed with other nonprofit and public partners. EBALDC received a revolving line of credit as part of a regional affordable housing investment fund managed by the Local Initiatives Support Corporation (LISC). The organization has also been involved in affordable housing development projects in Oakland involving the redevelopment of underutilized sites.

== See also ==
- Chinatown, Oakland, California
- Urban renewal
