= Oakland Asian Cultural Center =

Coordinates: 37°48′1.637″N 122°16′18.129″W

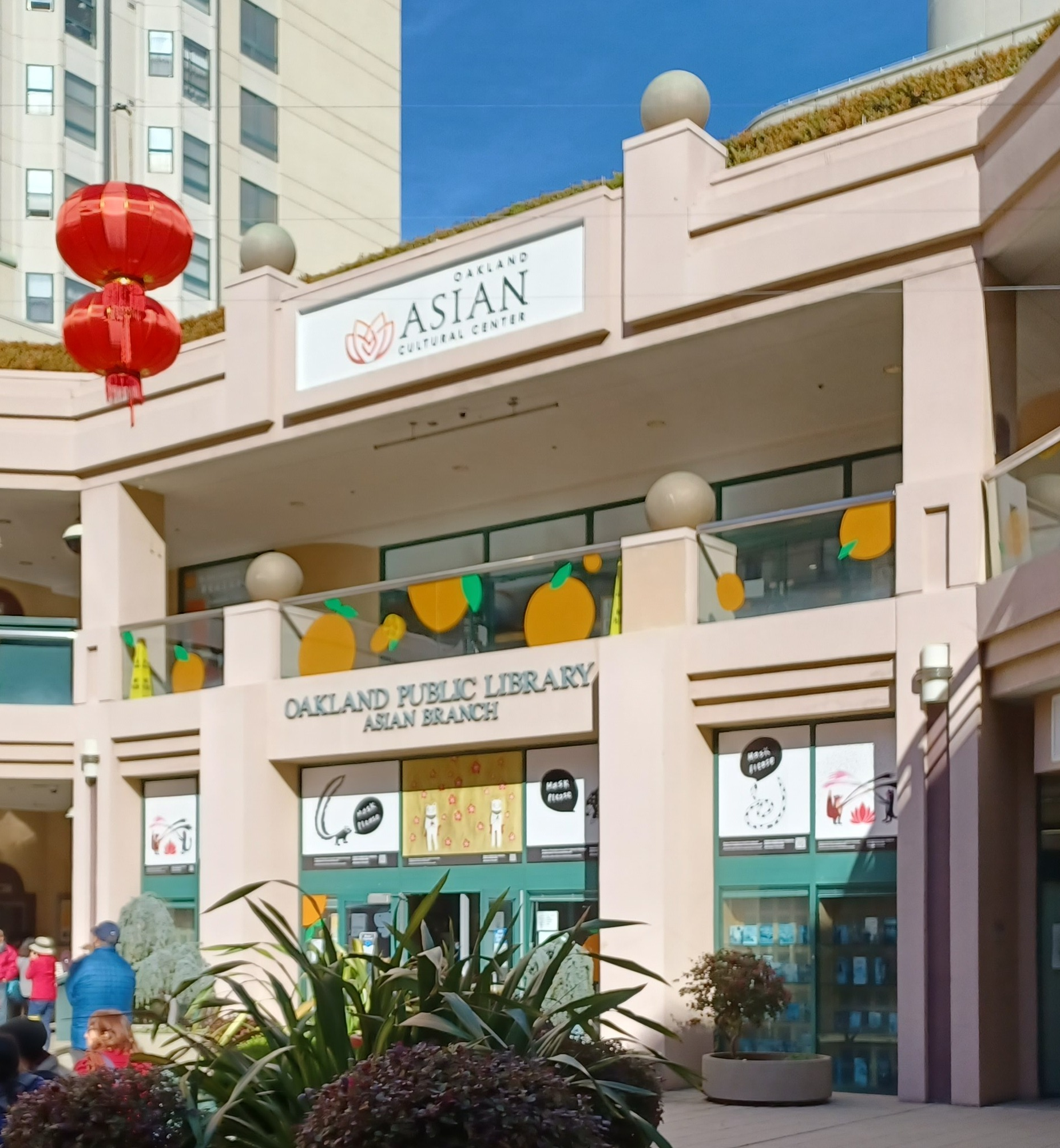
Oakland Asian Cultural Center

The Oakland Asian Cultural Center, also referred to as the OACC, is an Oakland-based nonprofit cultural center that carries out Asian and Pacific Islander American arts and culture programs. It is located in the Pacific Renaissance Plaza in Oakland Chinatown, residing three blocks away from the 12th Street Civic Center BART station on Broadway.

In the early 1980s, a community coalition asked for a space for a pan-Asian Cultural Center and the Asian Library, expressing a desire for an artistic and cultural space in the Chinatown area of Oakland. Historian Eve Ma notes that the Oakland Asian Cultural Center started in December 1984 as the East Bay Chinese Culture Center. In 1987, as it began acquiring help from the city government and recognizing that Chinatown's composition had changed, the Center changed its name, broadening its aim to include all Asian cultures."

Since opening its own facility in 1996 Oakland’s Chinatown district, the OACC has offered cultural programs including performances, workshops, festivals, school tours, classes, and exhibitions.

== Services ==
The OACC has educational programming and cultural activities for residents of Oakland Chinatown. Community groups and artists hold weekly classes in dance, martial arts, art, history, and language at the center. The activities offered at the center range from traditions that span across the world, including Japanese flower arrangement, Theravada Buddhist meditation, Chinese Gong Fu and Mongolian traditional dance.

The space has an auditorium with a stage, conference rooms, dance studio, lobby, and kitchen that serve as ongoing and one-time resources for local nonprofit organizations, schools, government agencies, Fortune 500 companies, and individuals. The auditorium is named after Edward W. Chin. Chin donated $250,000 towards the completion of the center's auditorium, a space that is used for major events.

== Events ==
In the past, the OACC hosted events featuring traditional and contemporary Asian arts, music, and dance with family-friendly activities and vendors such as the Harvest Moon Festival Celebration and Elements of Rhythm: Drums of Asia. Recurring events include the Lunar New Year Celebration, Asian Heritage Street Celebration, and OACC Gala. It also hosted a Larry Itliong Day in honor of the titular labor union leader, as well as an anniversary public screening of the first Asian American film, The Curse of Quon Gwon.

== Exhibits ==
OACC has free exhibitions. Its exhibitions stem from traditional and contemporary culture from all over the world. The cultural center’s past exhibitions include Reflections: Vietnam Through the Eyes of Vietnamese Americans, Oakland Chinatown Oral History Project, Calligraphies in Conversation, Asians 4 Black Lives, Epekto Arts, and Drums of Asia.

One of its most recognized exhibitions is the Oakland Chinatown Oral History Project, which was started by Oakland Chinatown's Community Advisory Committee in 2005. The committee sought to engage the community by seeking oral history and narratives from the Chinatown area.

Below is the project's mission statement.

"The Oakland Chinatown Oral History Project (OCOHP), spearheaded by the Oakland Asian Cultural Center (OACC), aims to capture the living history of Oakland Chinatown by bringing youth to interview Oakland Chinatown elders. The goals of the OCOHP are to document the stories of Oakland Chinatown, preserve its cultural and historical legacy, and increase understanding across generations."

== Artist in Residence ==
The OACC also has an Artist in Residence Program, which supports emerging and established Bay Area artists in creating new works that premiere in the center.

The artist in residence from 2012-2015 was Seibi Lee, a Kathak dancer. Past artists-in-residence include Gamelan Sekar Jaya, Philip Huang, Nitya Venkateswaran, Asian Pacific Islander Youth Promoting Advocacy and Leadership (AYPAL), Karmacy, Word & Violin, the Shaolin Buddhist Temple & Education Foundation, Vidya, Kyoungil Ong, Rina Mehta, Jay Loyola, and Judith Kajiwara.

== Publications ==
In August 2014, the cultural center launched a zine entitled “I Am Here," featuring the works of various local community artists and writers. Its second zine, entitled, “I Am a Warrior,” came out in August 2015.

== See also ==
- Asian Art Museum
- Asian Pacific American Heritage Month
- Oakland Museum of California
