= Erastus Wentworth =

American missionary (1813–1886)

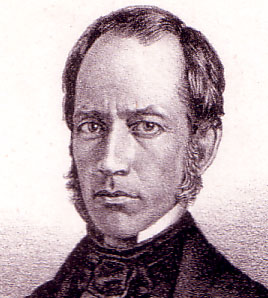
- Missionary to China
- Born: August 5, 1813; Stonington, Connecticut
- Died: May 26, 1886 (aged 72); Hudson Falls, New York

Signature from Wentworth Genealogy

Erastus Wentworth (simplified Chinese: 万为; traditional Chinese: 萬為; Pinyin: Wànwéi; Foochow Romanized: Uâng-ùi; August 5, 1813 – May 26, 1886) was an educator, a Methodist Episcopal minister, and a missionary to Fuzhou, China.

== Life ==
Dr. Wentworth was born in Stonington, Connecticut. He converted to Methodism in 1831. Later he studied at the Cazenovia Seminary and earned a bachelor's degree at Wesleyan University in 1837.

Wentworth began teaching after leaving college. From 1838 to 1846, he taught natural science in the Gouverneur Wesleyan Seminary; from 1841 to 1846, in the Troy Conference Academy; and in 1846, he became president of the McKendree College, remaining there until 1850, when he took the chair of natural philosophy and chemistry in Dickinson College. In 1850, he received the degree of D.D. from Allegheny College.

In 1854, Dr. Wentworth left his position to spearhead a Methodist Mission to Fuzhou, China, along with some students who were just graduating from Dickinson, including Otis T. Gibson. In 1862, his wife's poor health forced him to return to the United States, where he then worked as a pastor to the Troy Conference Academy.

Wentworth edited the Ladies' Repository from 1872–76, after which he semi-retired, writing and serving on committees for the Methodist Church. On May 26, 1886, he died at his home in Sandy Hill, New York, aged 73.

== Family ==
The son of Erastus and Esther (States) Wentworth, and seventh generation descendant of William Wentworth (elder), Erastus married three times, was widowed twice, and had twelve children, one in China.
