= Elizabeth Chamberlain Gibson =

American wife of the Methodist missionary Otis Gibson (1830–1916)

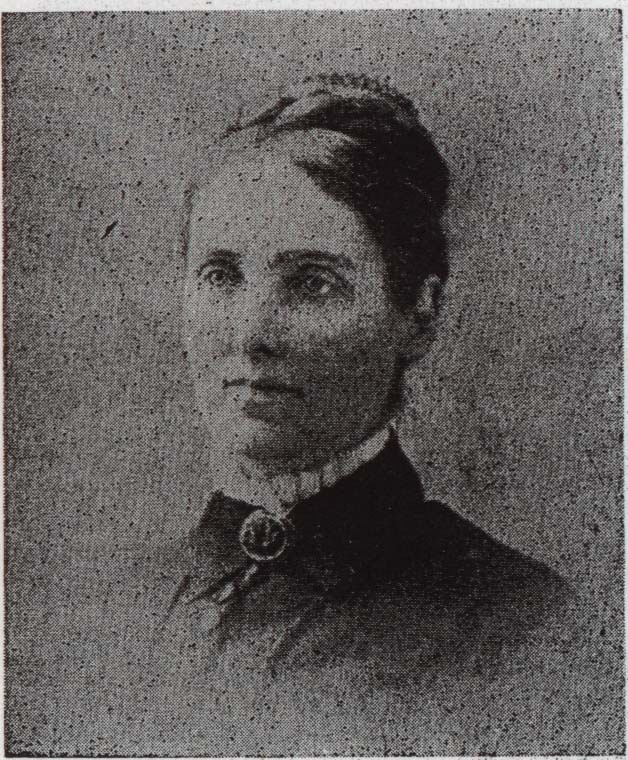
- Born: April 28, 1830; Brazier Falls, New York
- Died: December 22, 1916 (aged 86); Los Angeles, California
- Occupation: Missionary
- Spouse: Otis Gibson

Elizabeth Chamberlain Gibson (April 28, 1830 - December 22, 1916) was the wife of the Methodist missionary Otis Gibson.

== Life ==
Eliza Chamberlain was born on April 28, 1830, at Brazier Falls, New York into a Quaker family. In her early years Eliza attended a female seminary and had a certificate to teach in schools. She met Otis Gibson in Maryland; they soon fell in love with each other. She married Otis in spite of the opposition from her parents.

A few months after their marriage, Eliza and Otis were called to New York City to board a clipper ship about to sail to China. On August 13, 1855, they reached Fuzhou and remained in the mission field for the next ten years. They had two sons in China; one died in infancy.

Due to Eliza's declining health, the Gibsons returned to the Moira, United States in 1865. In 1868 the couple were appointed to nurture the new Methodist church set up in San Francisco for the large Chinese immigrants (mostly Cantonese) in California, where they remained in the field for the rest of their lives. On August 10, 1870, the Gibsons founded Women's Missionary Society of the Pacific Coast.

Eliza Chamberlain died on December 22, 1916, in Los Angeles.
