= Lew Hing =

- 劉興
- Born: May 1858; Guangzhou, China (formally Canton)
- Died: March 7, 1934 (aged 75); Oakland, California, U.S.
- Other name: Lew Yu-ling
- Occupations: Industrialist, banker, real estate developer
- Known for: pioneer in the canning industry, founding father of San Francisco and Oakland Chinatowns

Lew Hing (formal married name was Lew Yu-ling; Chinese: 劉興; May 1858–March 7, 1934) was a Chinese-born American industrialist and banker. He was one of the founding fathers of "New Chinatown" following the San Francisco Earthquake of 1906. He also led the establishment of Chinatown in Oakland, California. He was one of the wealthiest Chinese immigrants in America.

After migrating to the United States from China in 1871, Lew became a pioneer in the canning industry. He owned four canneries in California, in the cities of San Francisco, Oakland, Monterey, and Antioch. His canneries supplied Herbert Hoover’s American Relief program following World War I.

In the San Francisco Bay Area, Lew owned a shipping company, two hotels, and an import-export business. In Mexico, he owned a cotton plantation. He was Chairman of the Board of Directors for the China Mail Steamship Company, and President of the Canton Bank of San Francisco. He was also a real estate developer.

Today, his legacy is continued in the Pacific Cannery Lofts in Oakland by Holliday Development, where dedications are made in his honour in one of his original buildings for the Pacific Coast Canning Company.

== Early life ==
Lew was born May 1858 in Canton, China. He was the second of three children born to his father's third wife (after the first two wives died). Lew had an older sister and a younger brother, as well as half brothers and sisters. His birthplace and ancestral roots were in the village-cluster of Li’ao (裡坳鄉) in Sunning (新寧) (the former name of the district), in the "Four Districts" (四邑) region in the Pearl River Delta Region of the province of Guangdong, China. He received his formal education in Hong Kong.

Before Lew was born, his father journeyed to San Francisco to find prosperity. Rejecting conscription as a laborer and the San Francisco's Barbary Coast lifestyle, he camped along the shores of San Francisco Bay. He returned to China after two months.

=== In San Francisco ===
In 1868, Lew's elder half-brother ventured to San Francisco to start a small metal shop on Commercial Street. Lew migrated to America in 1869 at his half-brother's suggestion. He arrived one year after the Burlingame Treaty, which made immigration between the countries easier. In 1872, his half-brother planned a brief vacation back to Canton to visit his family. His square rigged sailing vessel was off the coast of Japan when it caught fire and sank, causing all aboard to perish at sea. This left Lew, age 13, alone in San Francisco, without family or money.

He attended educational classes at a missionary school and learned English while translating shipments from China for U.S. Customs. Lew met P. W. Bellingall, a successful businessman in the importing and exporting field through this experience.

The growing Chinese community that would later become known as San Francisco's Chinatown was beginning to form familial associations that provided leadership and social opportunities among the Chinese immigrants to America. Men with the same surnames would help each other as brothers. This was the beginning of family association in Chinatown, and it was through such association that the young Lew was able to survive. It was with such family association guidance that Lew continued working at his deceased brother's metal shop, while attending a local church mission to learn to read and write English. In doing so, he also learned to do his own bookkeeping and accounting. Never afraid to work long hours, he also accepted odd jobs for extra money. His industrious and entrepreneurial spirit carried him through these difficult years.

== Marriage and children ==
In 1877, Lew married Chin Shee (July 1860 – July 1947) in San Francisco. They had three sons and four daughters, each born in San Francisco.

- Lew Yuet-yung, aka Mrs. Quan Yick-sun (1879–1967)
- Lew Gin-gow (1885–1943)
- Lew Yuen-hing, aka Mrs. Ho Chou-won (1889–1978)
- Lew Wai-hing, aka Mrs. Ng Min-hing (1890–1969)
- Thomas Gunn-sing Lew, also known as Tom Lowe (1894–1974)
- Lew Soon-hing Rose, aka Rose Lew Moon (1898–1993)
- Ralph Ginn Lew (1903–1987)

== Early career ==
Though he was never as skilled in metalwork as his older half-brother had been, he learned the basics, such as soldering. In addition, among his odd jobs he helped a European woman make her fruit jams for storage in glass jars. This taught Lew about food preservation and how to avoid food poisoning. It was a natural next step for Lew to combine his metalwork with his food preservation skills to join in the new industry of canning foodstuffs.

At age 18 in 1877, Lew founded his first cannery with another metalworker of Family Association ties, Lew Yu-tung. The cannery was located at the northeast corner of Sacramento and Stockton Streets in San Francisco and took up the first two stories of the building with the basement as storage. Lew and other Family Association members lived on the third floor.

In the 1880s–1890s, canning food was still a new concept. Lew embarked on a long period of trial and error before the cannery could reliably produce safe and edible canned foods. When food was not preserved properly or the cans were not fully sterilized (for example, each can had to be soldered individually by hand), noxious bacterial action would ruin the product, causing cans to swell and even explode. Eventually, Lew developed safer and more effective formulas for canning various fruits and vegetables. These formulas were never documented since they were Lew's trade secrets and were kept from rival canneries. Canned fruit items became a very good seller in Chinatown as many Chinese made purchases to take back to China. Soon, the products were purchased by Westerners and sales expanded outside San Francisco's Chinatown.

== Middle years ==
Lew's original cannery thrived for over two decades. Then, in 1902, at age 44, he decided to close the cannery and retire to Canton. However, within a year Lew returned to the Bay Area, opening the Pacific Coast Canning Company at 12th and Pine Streets in Oakland.

Lew built his new cannery as the first concrete building in the industrial part of Oakland, he insisted on the most advanced machinery for mass-production of his products. Also, in contrast to San Francisco, Oakland had space for a larger cannery as well as providing the Southern Pacific railroad tracks directly to the cannery dock for easy shipping of Lew's Buckskin-brand canned-goods throughout the United States. Products included asparagus, cherries, apricots, peaches, pears, and grapes; tomatoes were the most popular. Lew would go to the Tasting Room each morning and open, inspect, and taste batches of food processed the day before. Eventually, exports of Buckskin canned-goods would spread throughout the Western hemisphere.

In 1906, Lew was able to give substantial assistance to Bay Area earthquake victims. He opened his cannery to the homeless and provided tents elsewhere for temporary shelter. He hired cooks to provide meals. Following the earthquake, many San Franciscans relocated to Oakland, including several Chinese. As with several ethnic groups, Chinese were compelled to remain in ethnic clusters. Lew assisted these Chinese with finance and leadership by organizing neighborhoods, including the area that became Oakland's Chinatown. As a consequence, he became involved with many Oakland Chinatown organizations, making contributions to their many causes and forming business alliances in relation to the Pacific Canning Company.

As the Pacific Canning Company prospered, Lew diversified his interests into other areas, including developing a personal interest in the Loong Kong Tien Yee Association, an organization for the families of Lew, Quan, Jung and Chew, and fostered the group in both Oakland and San Francisco.

In 1907 Lew returned to San Francisco for added business interests. Given his leadership in the Chinese community, he became President of the Canton Bank of San Francisco, located at the northeast corner of Montgomery and Sacramento Streets. In the same year he entered the hotel-trade, building The Republic Hotel on Grant Avenue (near Sacramento Street). However, his San Francisco interests had to be juggled with his work as president and owner of Pacific Coast Canning Company in Oakland. A careful and punctual man, he devised a schedule that allowed him to spend half of each work-day in San Francisco, half in Oakland.

== Later years ==
By 1910, Lew had entered the import-export trade, first as an investor with Sing Chong and Fook Wah Companies which imported art goods from China. Then, in 1910, Lew began his own import-export business, shipping wholesale Chinese food items from Hop Wo Cheung in Canton, China to Hop Wo Lung, a store on Grant Avenue in San Francisco.

By 1911, Lew Hing's Pacific Coast Canning Company had become one of Oakland's largest businesses, providing over 1,000 jobs during the peak canning seasons. Employees were usually from the local Portuguese, Italian, and Chinese communities. Lew was the Bay Area's single largest employer of Chinese.

In 1912 Lew built his second hotel, originally named the Mun Ming Lue Kwan, at 858-870 Clay Street, between Grant and Stockton Streets. Still in existence, the name has since been changed to The Lew Hing building in honor of Lew.

In 1915, Lew accepted the position of Chairman of the Board of Directors for the China Mail Steamship Co. Ltd., whose office was in the same building as his Canton Bank office.

In 1917, Lew expanded his cannery business by investing in the Bayside Canning Company, a sardine cannery at Monterey's famed Cannery Row. It was said that the sardines were so plentiful in Monterey Bay that they actually swam their way into the cannery.

By World War I, Pacific Coast Canning Company was regularly exporting convenient canned goods to Europe. This provided an easy source for Herbert Hoover's food rehabilitation program for Europe. Lew's efforts were now helping the United States to win the war.

From 1916 to 1921, Lew was the principal owner of a cotton plantation known as Wa Muck in Mexicali, Mexico. For laborers, he conscripted hundreds of Chinese from China who would pass through San Francisco and go directly to Mexico by rail. Lew set aside a few city blocks of land on the plantation for shops to accommodate the needs of Chinese workers; the remains of this impromptu Chinatown still exist in Mexicali.

In 1918, Lew was on a "hate list" for assassination, which made local and international news.

In 1928, at age 70, Lew established his fourth cannery, the West Coast Canning Company, along the shores of San Pablo Bay in Antioch, California.

== Legacy ==
Lew was a pioneer in California industry. The Lew Hing building remains in San Francisco's Chinatown, and Oakland's Chinatown owes incalculable gratitude to Lew. The Pacific Coast Canning Company's building had remained, though empty, at 12th and Pine Streets in Oakland. In 2006 this building was torn down and replaced by housing, Pacific Cannery Lofts, with a plaque commemorating Lew and his importance to the site.

After a career in canning, shipping, hotels, banking, and other industries, Lew considered his most worthy contribution to be the swimming pool for the youth at the San Francisco Chinese YMCA, built in 1925. For more than 80 years, the pool that Lew built was the only swimming pool in San Francisco's Chinatown. Lew advocated for education around the world. The Qing government recognized the importance of providing education in the Chinese language and culture for the growing population of American born Chinese. Lew contributed to the founding of Chinese schools. With any education-related requests for help, student aid efforts, and contributions to educational institutions abroad, he never turned them down. Some of his contributions included funding for Chinese students' dormitory loans and donating to Peking University to raise money for a library.

Lew generated business in the community and created job opportunities for the Chinese in the Bay Area. His work provided opportunities for Chinese immigrants and assisted their assimilation and integration into the Western ways of life in the United States.

He related well to the Caucasian community, as indicated when he often attended formal civic events and was included in the inner circle of San Francisco's long-time mayor, Jimmy Rolph. Lew became very American in his ways, never again desiring to return to China.
