= Chinatown, Oakland, California =

Oakland Chinatown 屋崙華埠
- Neighborhood of Oakland
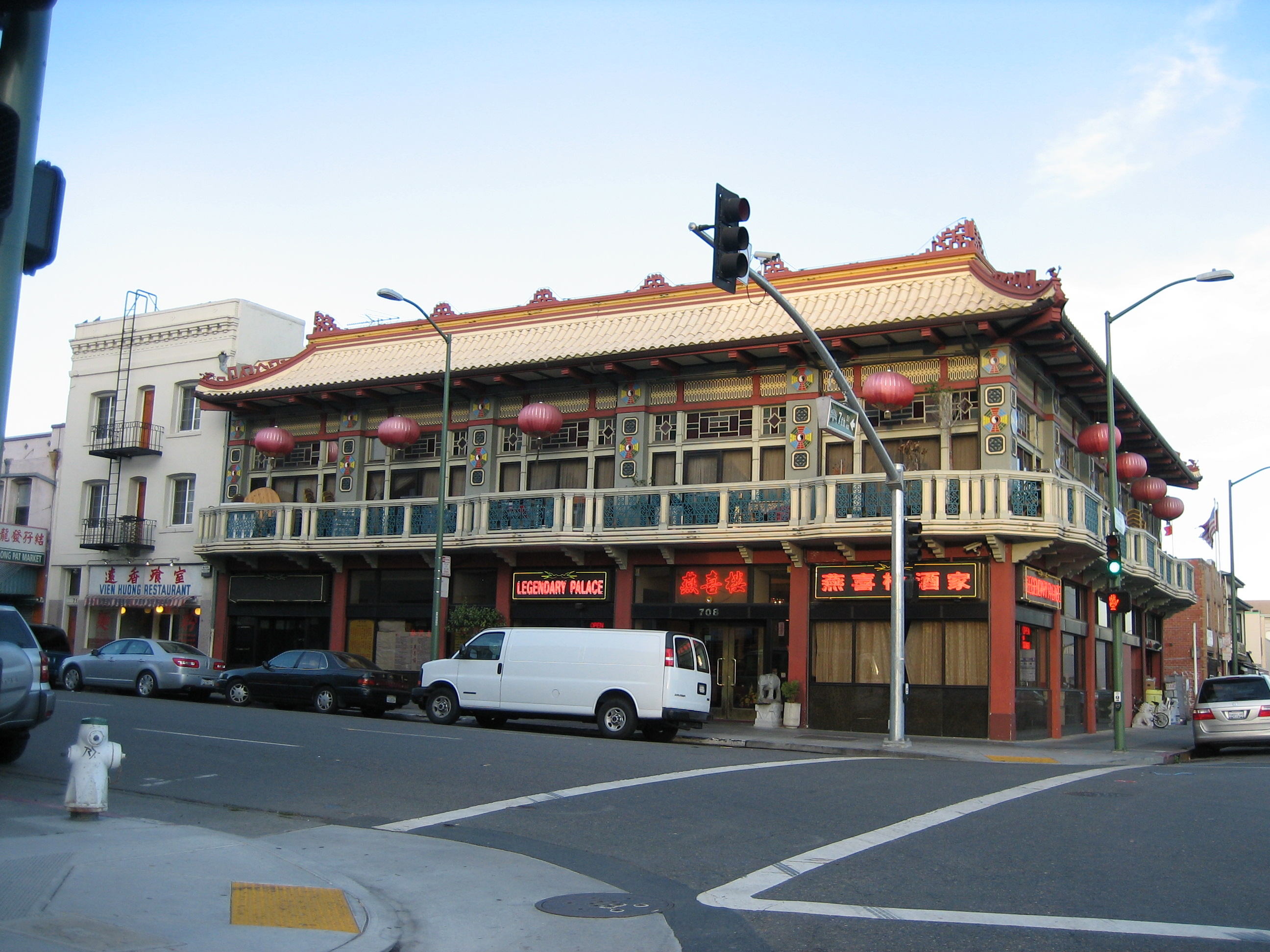
- Legendary Palace restaurant at the corner of Franklin and 7th Street in Oakland.

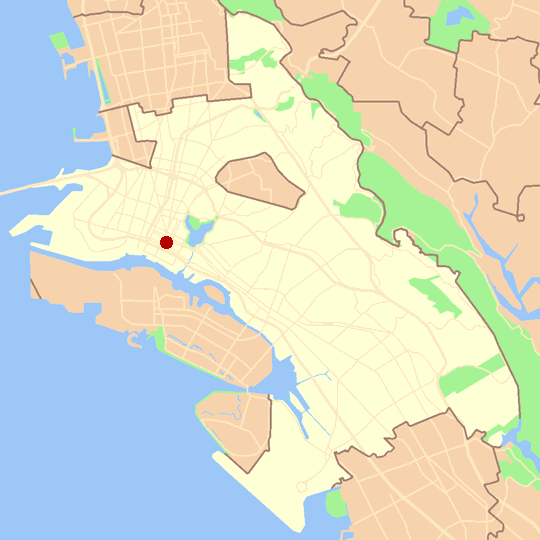
- Location of Oakland's Chinatown in the City of Oakland.

- Location within California
- Coordinates: 37°48′00″N 122°16′13″W
- Country: United States
- State: California
- County: Alameda
- Metro Area: the San Francisco Bay Area
- City: Oakland
- Settled: 1850
- Annexed: 1852

Government
  - District 2 Councilmember: Nikki Fortunato Bas
- Elevation: 34 ft (10 m)
- Time zone: UTC-8 (PST)
  - Summer (DST): UTC-7 (PDT)
- ZIP code: 94607
- Area code: 510
- BART stations: 12th Street Oakland City Center, Lake Merritt
- Website: Oakland Chinatown Chamber of Commerce

The Chinatown neighborhood in Oakland, California (Chinese: 屋崙華埠), is traditionally Chinese which reflects Oakland's diverse Chinese American, and more broadly Asian American community. It is frequently referred to as "Oakland Chinatown" in order to distinguish it from nearby San Francisco's Chinatown. It lies at an elevation of 39 feet (12 m).

Chinese were the first Asians to arrive in Oakland in the 1850s, followed by Japanese in the 1890s, Koreans in the 1900s, and Filipinos in the 1930s and 1940s. Southeast Asians began arriving in the 1970s during the Vietnam War. Many Asian languages and dialects can be heard in Chinatown due to its diverse population.

Chinatown is located in downtown Oakland, with its center at 8th Street and Webster Street. Its northern edge is 12th Street, and its southern edge is Interstate 880 (located approximately at 6th Street). It stretches from Broadway on the west to the southern tip of Lake Merritt in the east. Due to a combination of factors, some more broad-based related to difficult circumstances for Oakland itself, while other factors are more specific to this neighborhood, Oakland's Chinatown faces a struggle for survival.

== Geography ==
Selected locations in Chinatown, Oakland
- Points of interest
- BART stations
- Parks and open spaces
- Medical
1 12th Street Oakland City Center
2 Pacific Renaissance Plaza
3 Lincoln Square Park
4 Oakland Museum of California
5 Asian Health Services (Chenming and Margaret Hu)
6 Chinese Community United Methodist Church
7 Buddhist Church of Oakland
8 Wilma Chan Park (formerly Madison Park)
9 Lake Merritt
10 Chinese Garden Park

Chinatown is located in Downtown Oakland, bounded by Broadway to the west, Interstate 880 to the south, Fallon Street and Laney College to the east, and 12th Street to the north, although the City of Oakland considers the northern edge to be 14th Street. The historic commercial core of the neighborhood lies along Webster (between 7th and 9th) and 8th (between Franklin and Harrison).

Many Chinatowns in America have added a formal entry gate (Paifang) since 1970, marking the entrance to the district, but Oakland has not; aside from the architecture, bilingual street signs are distinctive features of the neighborhood. The northern portals of the Posey and Webster Street Tubes, which carry traffic underneath the estuary between Oakland and Alameda, are on the edge of Chinatown. Unlike

The neighborhood can be roughly divided into two distinct areas:

1. The western half, between Broadway and Harrison Street, is the commercial area, with busy streets lined with markets, restaurants, banks, and other businesses.
2. The eastern half, east of Harrison Street, is more residential in character with more apartments and condominiums, less crowded sidewalks, and a mix of retail stores that are more service and product oriented, with fewer groceries and restaurants.

Though most commercial activity is south of 10th Street, there are nonetheless many retail shops, stores, and restaurants north of 10th Street and in other parts of Downtown Oakland which are owned by Chinese and Korean merchants. In particular at the edge of Chinatown, 14th street between Webster and Harrison is a block which features numerous Korean restaurants and businesses, especially on the north side of the block.

Recent immigrants have also moved south into "New Oakland Chinatown" in the San Antonio neighborhood along International Boulevard (formerly East 14th Street) and Eastlake business district on East 18th Street. Owing to a combination of multifactorial issues, some more generally tied to socioeconomic difficulties afflicting Oakland itself, while other factors are more specific to this neighborhood, Oakland's Chinatown faces a struggle for survival and is shrinking.

=== Notable landmarks ===
- Bill Louie's Corner - 8th and Franklin

==== Chinese Community United Methodist Church ====
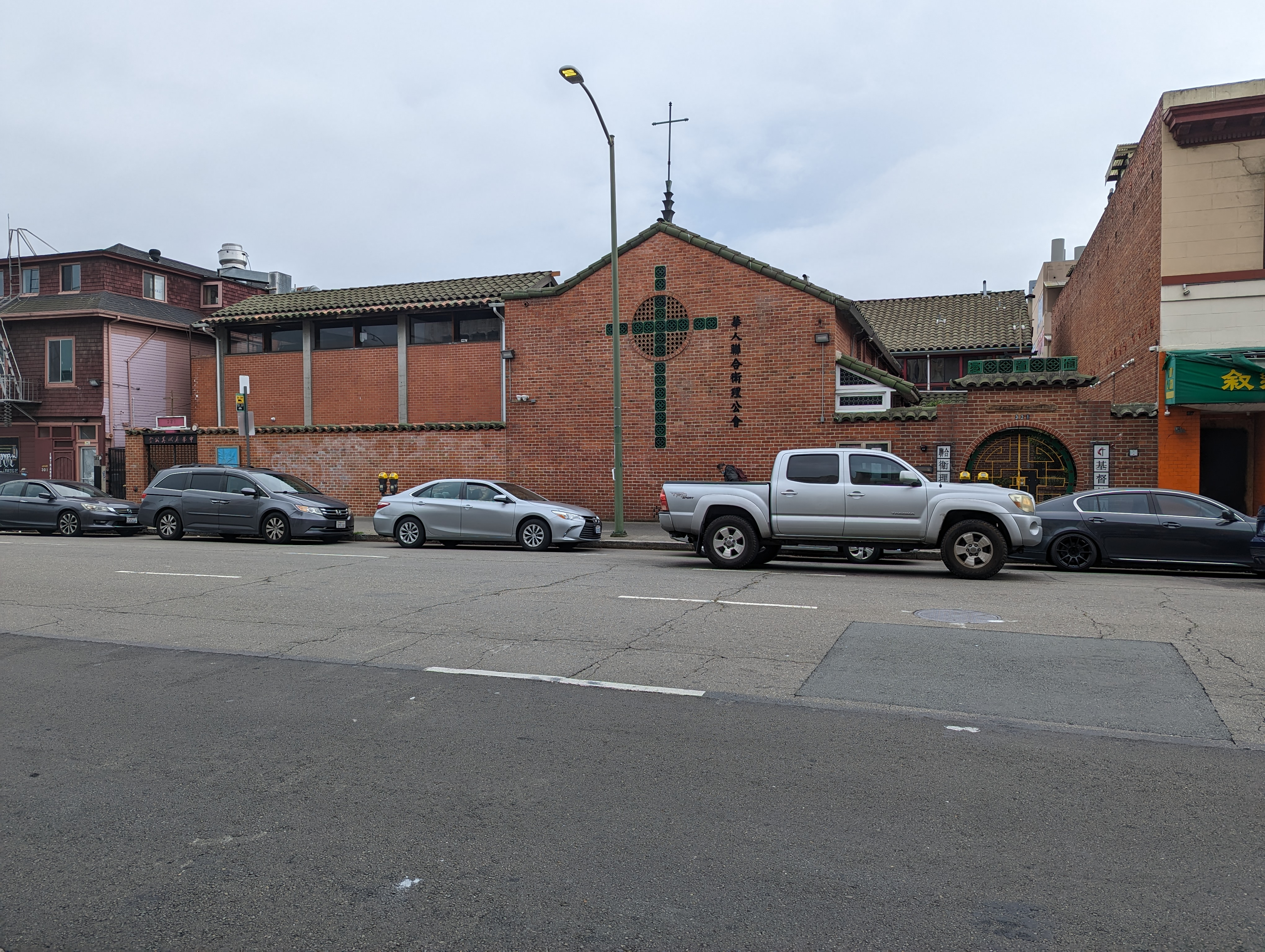
Chinese Community United Methodist Church

The Chinese Community United Methodist Church (CCUMC, Chinese: 屋崙華人聯合衛理教會; pinyin: Wūlún Huárén Liánhé Wèi Lǐ Jiàohuì), which was initially the Chinese Methodist Church, was founded in 1887. The church was established as part of a chain of Methodist Chinese Missions by the Rev. Dr. Otis Gibson. The two primary missions of this ministry was schools and refuge for women escaping slavery and prostitution. This church has close connections with the Women's Missionary Society of the Pacific Coast in San Francisco. In the early days, the Chinese Methodist Church held worship service and Sunday School. Then to serve the needs of the growing Chinese community, an English school for immigrants, and a Chinese school for the American-born Chinese also operated. The early days of the church was sustained by courageous workers, both Chinese- and American-born as there were strong anti-Chinese sentiments in California at this time.

The church was located at several sites in Oakland Chinatown. Chan Hon Fun was the pastor from 1900 to 1909 and established the church's current location in 1905 at 321 8th Street Oakland, CA 94607. In 1913, a fire devastated the building and a new building was erected. But by the 1940s, the church outgrew even this building. Under the leadership of Rev Edwar Lee, a new church and the current main sanctuary was built in 1952. With more growth, more space was needed, and a new social hall and classrooms annex was built in 1970.

Today, the Chinese Community United Methodist Church conducts both a Chinese (Cantonese and Mandarin) language worship service and English worship service on Sundays.

==== Pacific Renaissance Plaza ====
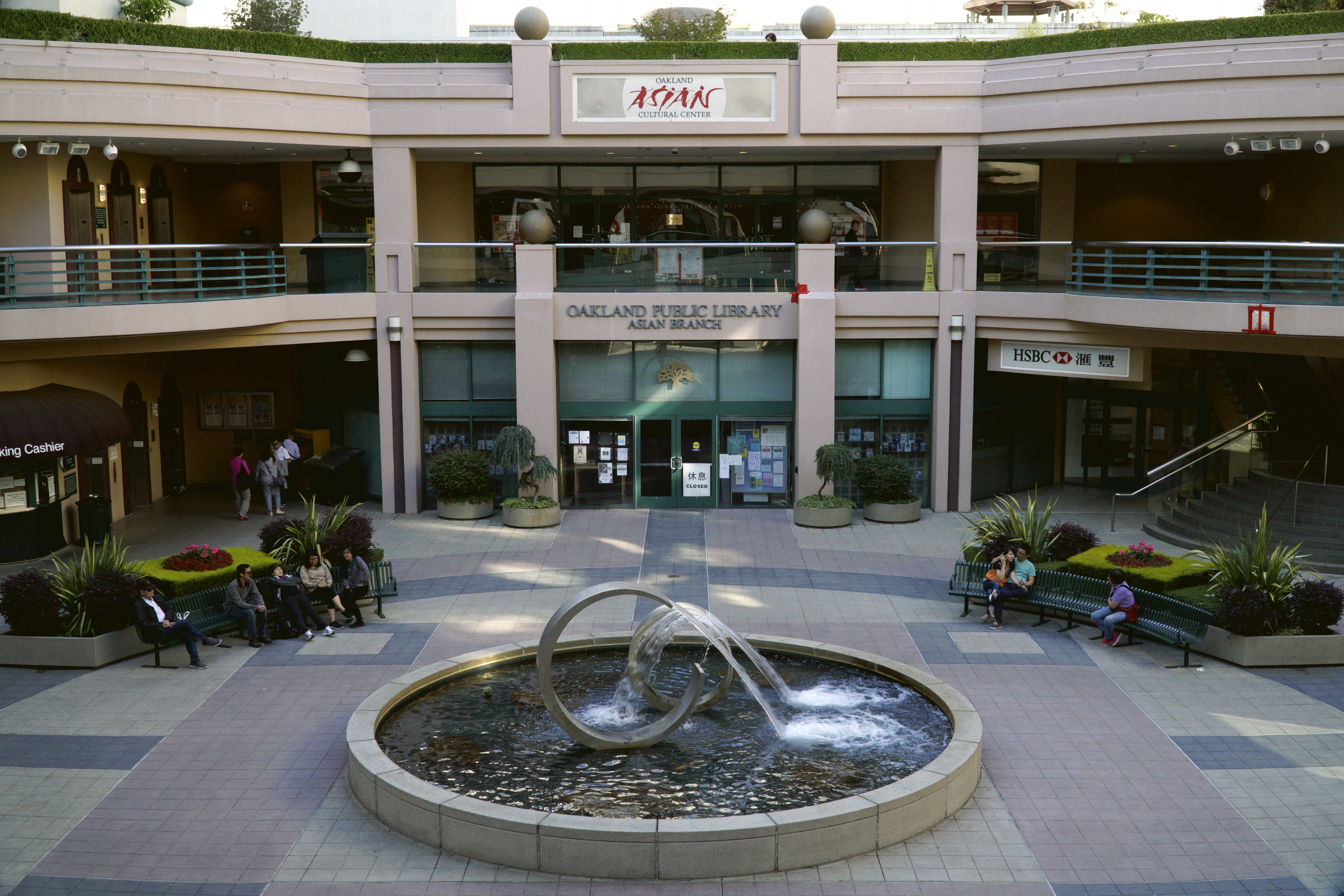
Pacific Renaissance Plaza in Oakland Chinatown contains the Asian Branch Library and Oakland Asian Cultural Center.

A mixed use complex built by Hong Kong investors in 1993, this plaza with a central fountain with seating is often viewed as the center of Oakland Chinatown. The first and second floors are mixed retail/office/civic spaces; it consists of many restaurants, jewelry store, banks, ice creamery, and other retail and health services as well as the Asian Branch Library and Oakland Asian Cultural Center. There are also residential condos/rentals on three sides of the plaza above the second floor: a 13-story residential building on the west side and two 4 story buildings on the south and east side. Underneath is a 3 level parking lot.

=== Parks ===
Parks in Oakland Chinatown

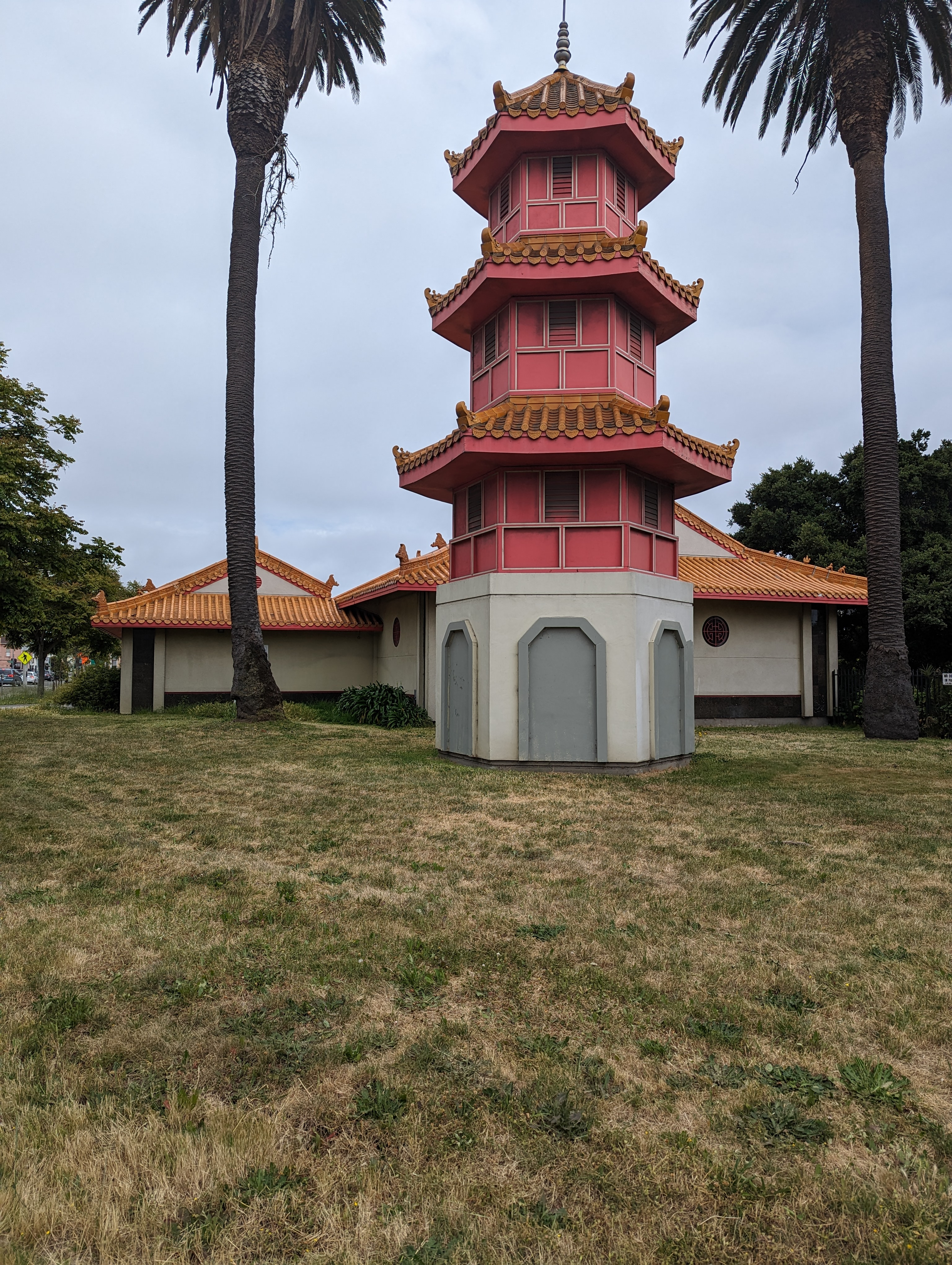
Chinese Garden Park has a small pagoda

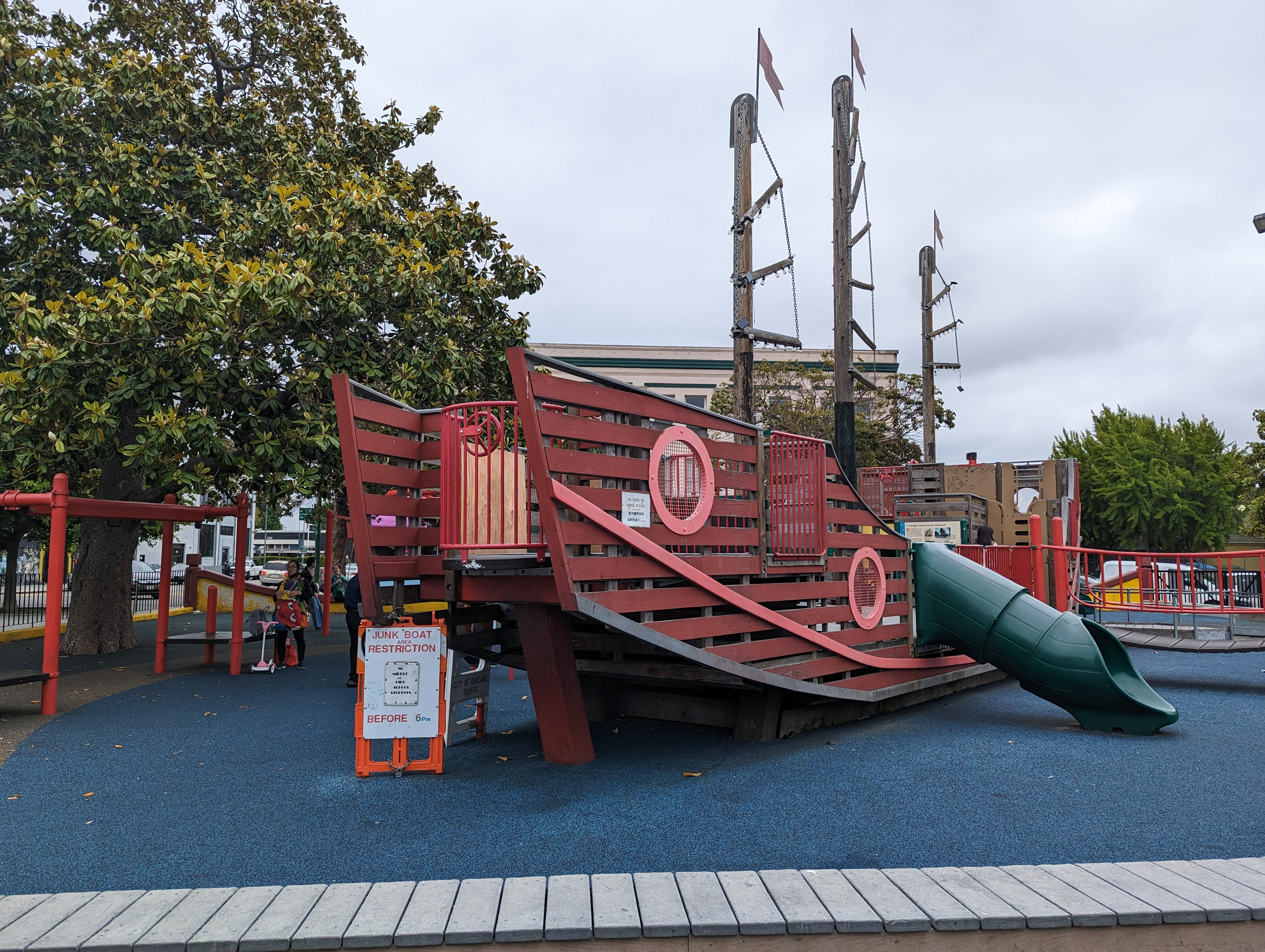
Junk-themed play structure at Lincoln Square Park

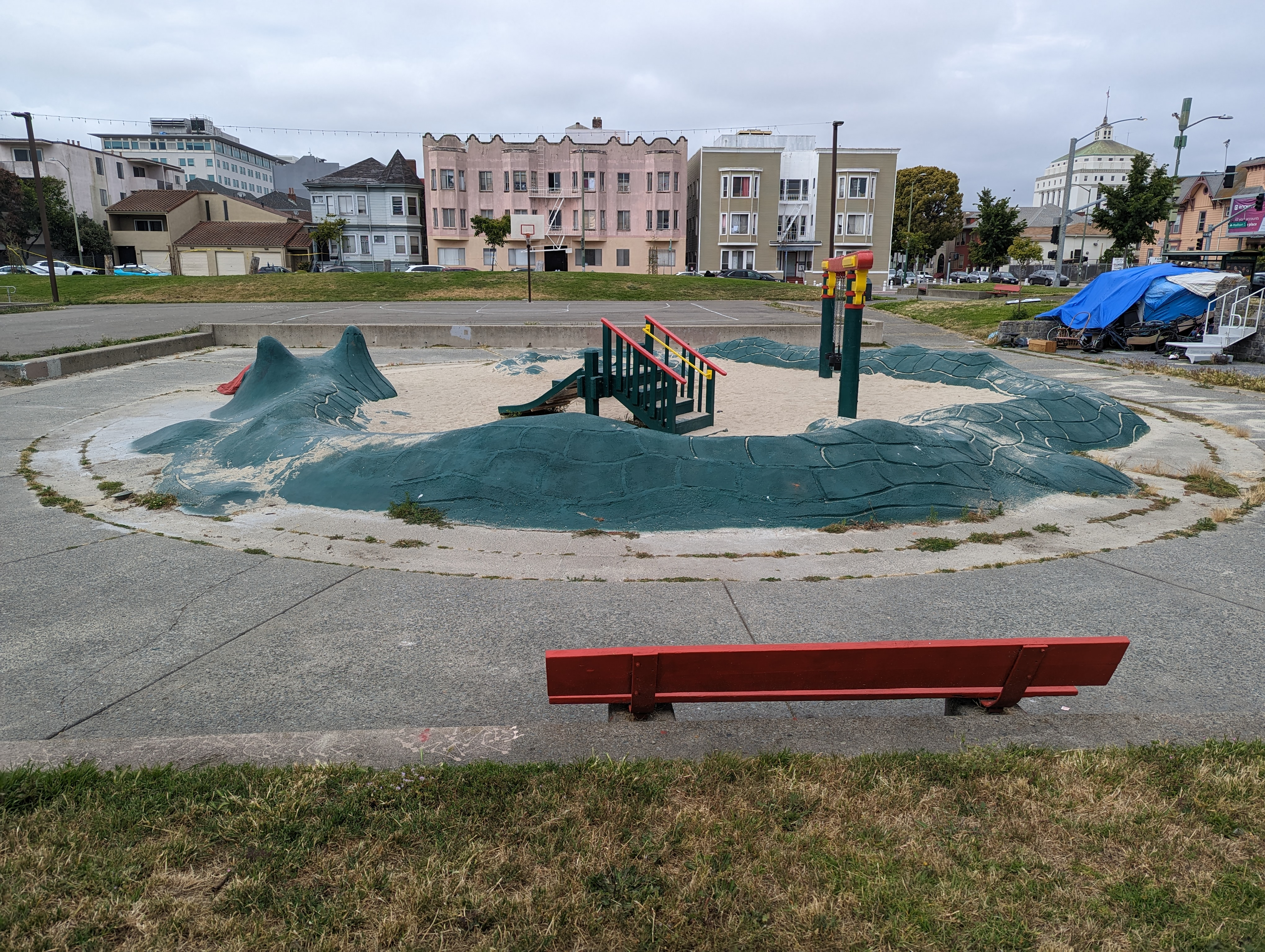
The small sand playground at Wilma Chan Park is encircled by a concrete dragon

There are three city parks in Chinatown, all east of Harrison and occupying one block each:

- Chinese Garden Park (bounded by Harrison, Alice, 6th, and 7th). This formerly was named Harrison Railroad Park, which displayed Southern Pacific 2467 and several historic cars for thirty years until 1990. The building was designed by Henry Chang Jr.
- Lincoln Square Park (bounded by Harrison, Alice, 10th, and 11th). The mural on the recreation center was painted by LuQman.
- Wilma Chan Park (bounded by Jackson, Madison, 8th, and 9th). This was formerly Madison Park, renamed in 2022 for Alameda County supervisor Wilma Chan, who died after being hit by a driver while walking her dog.

== History ==
=== Early days ===
Oakland Chinatown dates back to the arrival of Chinese immigrants in the 1850s, making it one of the oldest Chinatowns in North America. By 1860, the census of Oakland included 96 "Asiatics" among a total of 1,543 (6.2% of the city's population). More Chinese arrived to help build the Central Pacific Railroad western portion of the First transcontinental railroad during the Coolie slave trade during the 1860s.

The Chinese immigrants first settled in shrimp camps on the estuary of Oakland at 1st Street and Castro in the 1850s, near the Point in West Oakland which was referred to as "Chinese Point", and at 4th and Clay streets. The Chinese settlement at Telegraph between 16th and 17th streets burnt down in 1867 and was relocated at the San Pablo Avenue Chinatown between 19th and 20th streets; it is now known as Oakland's Old Uptown Chinatown. Other areas with prominent Chinese populations included 14th Street between Washington and Clay, and the Charter line (22nd Street) between Castro and Brush Streets.

=== Present location ===
Fears of the Yellow peril and local exclusion laws forced the Chinese population to resettle to its current location centered at 8th Street and Webster Street in the 1870s.

The first Chinese in Oakland fished in the San Francisco Bay for shrimp similarly to the Chinese at China Camp near San Rafael. In 1868, Chinese laborers built the Temescal Dam in Oakland providing water for the East Bay as well as the Lake Chabot Dam in 1874–75. They worked in canneries, cotton mills and fuse and explosive factories as well as farms.

In the 1880s, discriminatory laws made it difficult for Chinese immigrants to own land or even find work. They found work as laundry workers, cooks, gardeners, houseboys, or as vegetable peddlers. The Chinese Exclusion Act severely limited the further immigration of Chinese in 1882. By 1900, the Chinese in Oakland numbered less than 1,000.

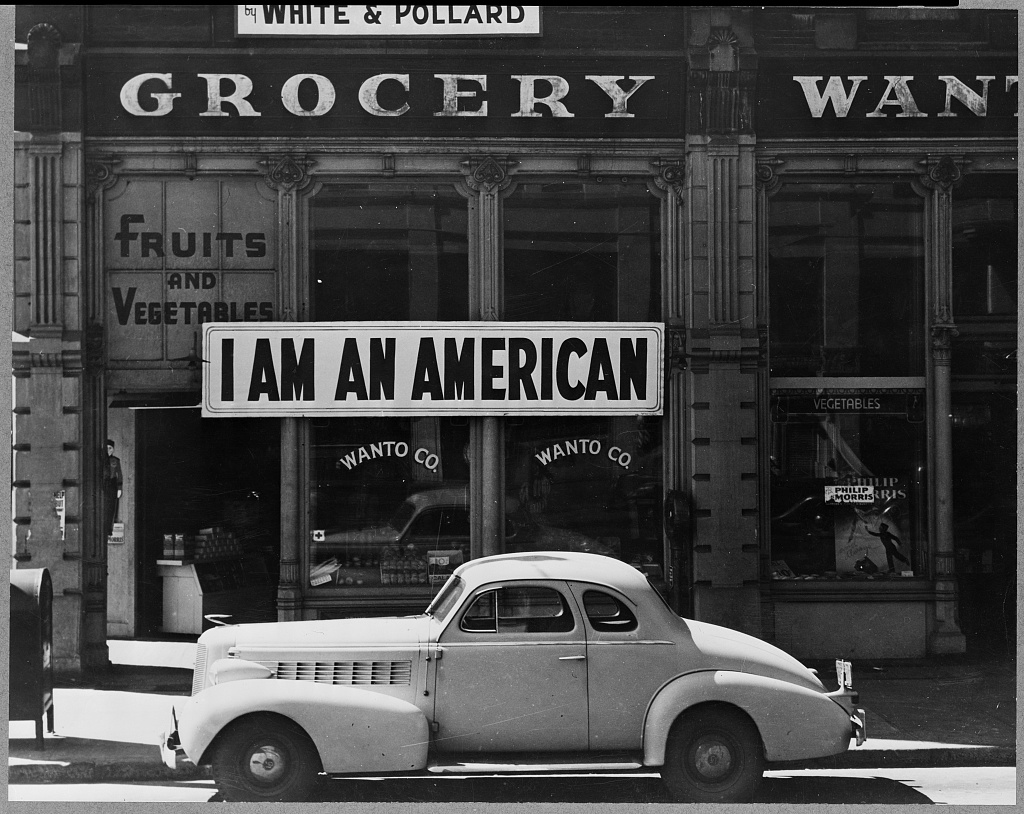
Dorothea Lange, Oakland, Calif., Mar. 1942. A large sign reading "I am an American" was placed in the window of the Wanto Co. grocery store, at [401 - 403 Eighth] and Franklin streets, on December 8, the day after Pearl Harbor. The store was closed following orders to persons of Japanese descent to evacuate from certain West Coast areas. The owner, a University of California graduate, will be housed with hundreds of evacuees in War Relocation Authority centers for the duration of the war

Settlers from other Asian countries began arriving after the Chinese Exclusion Act. Japanese immigrants began settling in Oakland in the 1890s mostly in West Oakland around Market Street. Later, hundreds were living in the section between Harrison and Oak streets south of 8th Street. They owned several stores in Chinatown. After the attack on Pearl Harbor in 1941, all Japanese Americans were sent to internment camps. The Masuda family had posted a large "I Am An American" sign outside their Oakland grocery store, Wanto Company, at 8th and Franklin streets which was photographed by Dorothea Lange. Many did not return to Oakland after the war ended. The Buddhist Church of Oakland is one of the few institutions remaining of Oakland's Japantown.

Filipinos immigrated to the area in the early 1900s. Oakland Chinatown was the center of commerce and community gathering for Filipinos in the East Bay during 1940–1960.

=== Earthquake alternative ===
The 1906 San Francisco earthquake and fire destroyed most of San Francisco's Chinatown and more than 4,000 Chinese survivors found refuge in Oakland. Even while San Francisco Chinatown was rebuilding, many stayed in Oakland, bringing the Chinatown population to about 2,500. Because of continuing immigration restrictions barring Chinese women and children, a bachelor society was created.

In the 1920s, Oakland Chinatown grew from 10th Street to the waterfront from Broadway to Harrison. Even in 1940, the Chinatown population grew only to about 3,000. With the United States involvement in World War II and the fact that China was an ally, the Chinese Exclusion Act was repealed in 1943, however the immigration quota was maintained at 105 immigrants per year.

=== Post-war growth ===
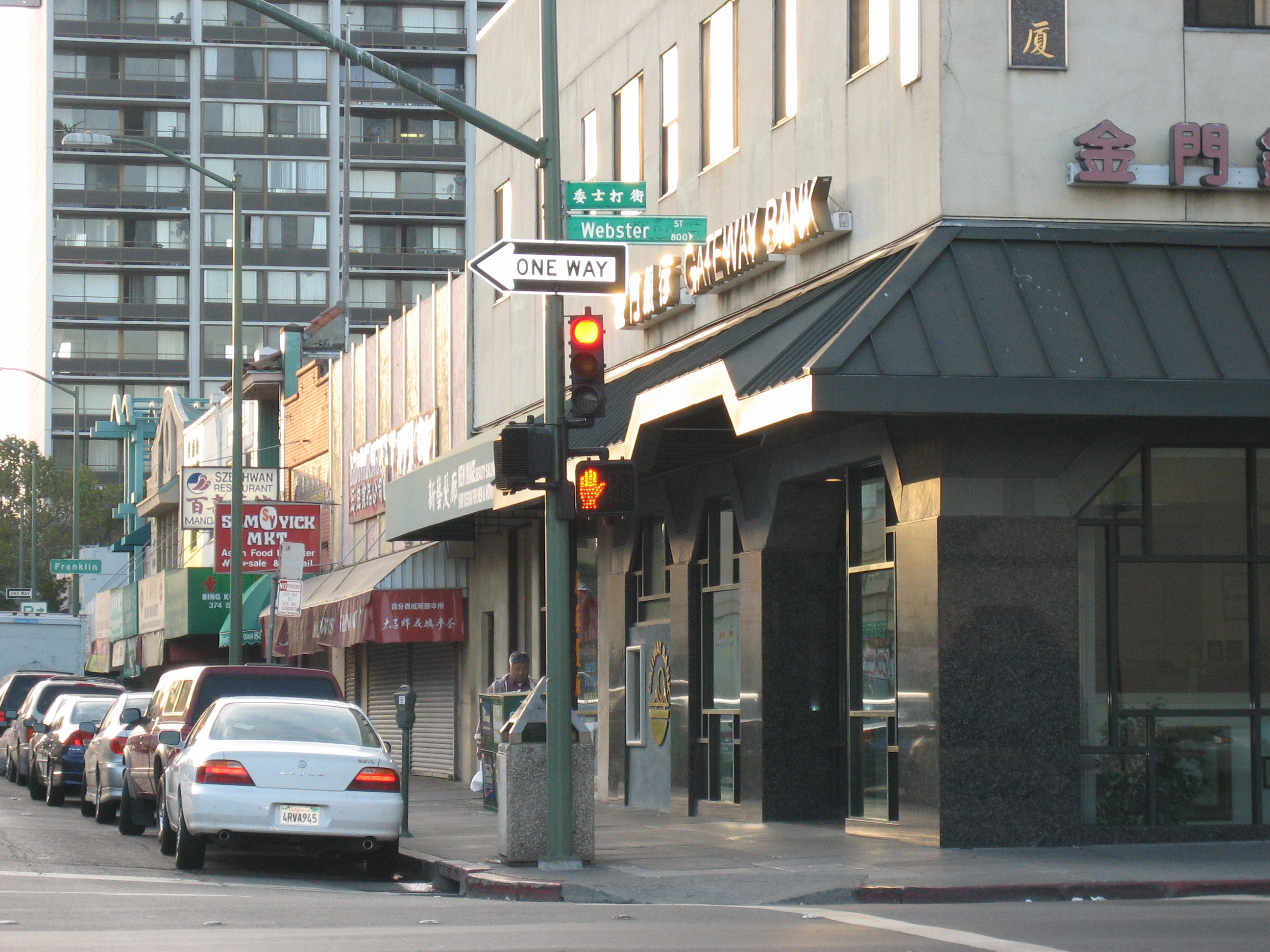
Chinese and English street signs in Chinatown.

In 1950, Chinatown had grown to a population of 5,500, but local housing was lost due to the construction of Interstate 880, which runs through 8 blocks between 5th and 6th streets and serves as a transportation artery for some of Chinatown's commercial activity, Laney College (8 blocks) and later in the late 1960s, the Bay Area Rapid Transit headquarters and Lake Merritt station (2 blocks) and Oakland Museum of California (4 blocks).

Oakland Chinatown was economically stagnant for many years, especially after multigenerational Chinatown residents began moving to the suburbs in the late 1960s.

Since the early 2000s, Chinatown has increased its revitalization efforts This includes new housing developments and community‑driven cultural events with the goal of preserving the neighborhood’s Asian American heritage.

=== Contemporary pan-Asian center ===
Chinatown saw much steady development during the 1980s and 1990s as Chinese American merchants relocated from San Francisco to Oakland, and due to increased immigration from mainland China, Hong Kong, Vietnam, Cambodia, and Thailand. During this time period, many ethnic Chinese Vietnamese and Chinese Cambodians began opening new small businesses, essentially replacing many of the older Taishanese-dominated businesses. Also, investors with Hong Kong backgrounds constructed the Pacific Renaissance Plaza in the early 1990s. Chinatown still retains the traditional aspects and characteristics of an older Chinatown. Oakland's Chinatown also includes a historic and still thriving fortune cookie factory. However, Oakland's Chinatown is now shrinking and faces an existential threat to it survival, due to macroeconomic ills afflicting Oakland as a whole, in addition to its aging infrastructure and residential inhabitants.

== People and culture ==
The residents of Oakland Chinatown include Chinese, Hispanic and Latino Americans, African Americans, Vietnamese, Korean, Filipino, Japanese, Cambodian, Laotian, Mien, Thai, Polynesian and others. Consequently, many languages and dialects can be heard, including Cantonese, Cebuano, English, Spanish, Chiu-Chow, Ilocano, Japanese, Khmer, Khmu, Korean, Lao, Malay, Mien, Tagalog, Taiwanese, Thai, Toishan, and Vietnamese.

Community organizations that are based in Chinatown, including local immigrant support groups, cultural advocacy coalitions, organizing yearly events to celebrate the neighborhood’s cultural diversity.

=== Annual cultural events and fairs ===
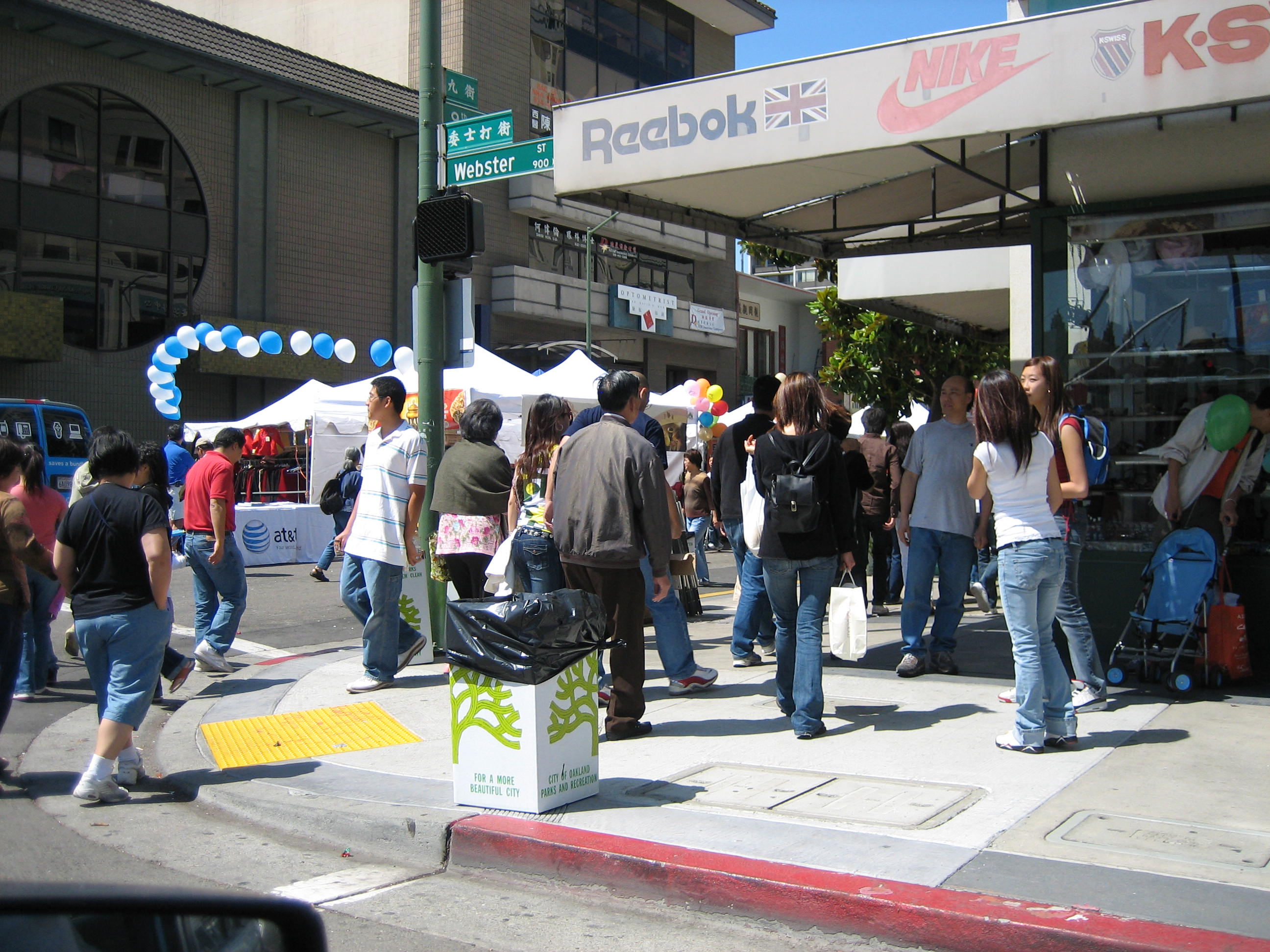
A crowded sidewalk during the 2006 Chinatown StreetFest.

- Chinese New Year (also known as Lunar New Year or Vietnamese Tết)
- Dragon boat races are held annually at Jack London Square or Treasure Island, California.
- The Oakland Chinatown StreetFest has been held on the 4th weekend of August annually since 1988.
- Mid-Autumn Festival (also known as Moon Festival or Vietnamese Tết Trung Thu)

=== Performing arts ===
Chinese opera was one of the first traditional Chinese art forms in Oakland. In 1907, a Chinese Theater at 9th and Franklin streets opened which could seat 500 people and had a company of 30 full-time actors from China. Today, three styles of Chinese opera clubs are active in Oakland: Cantonese opera, Beijing opera, and Kunqu.

=== Libraries ===
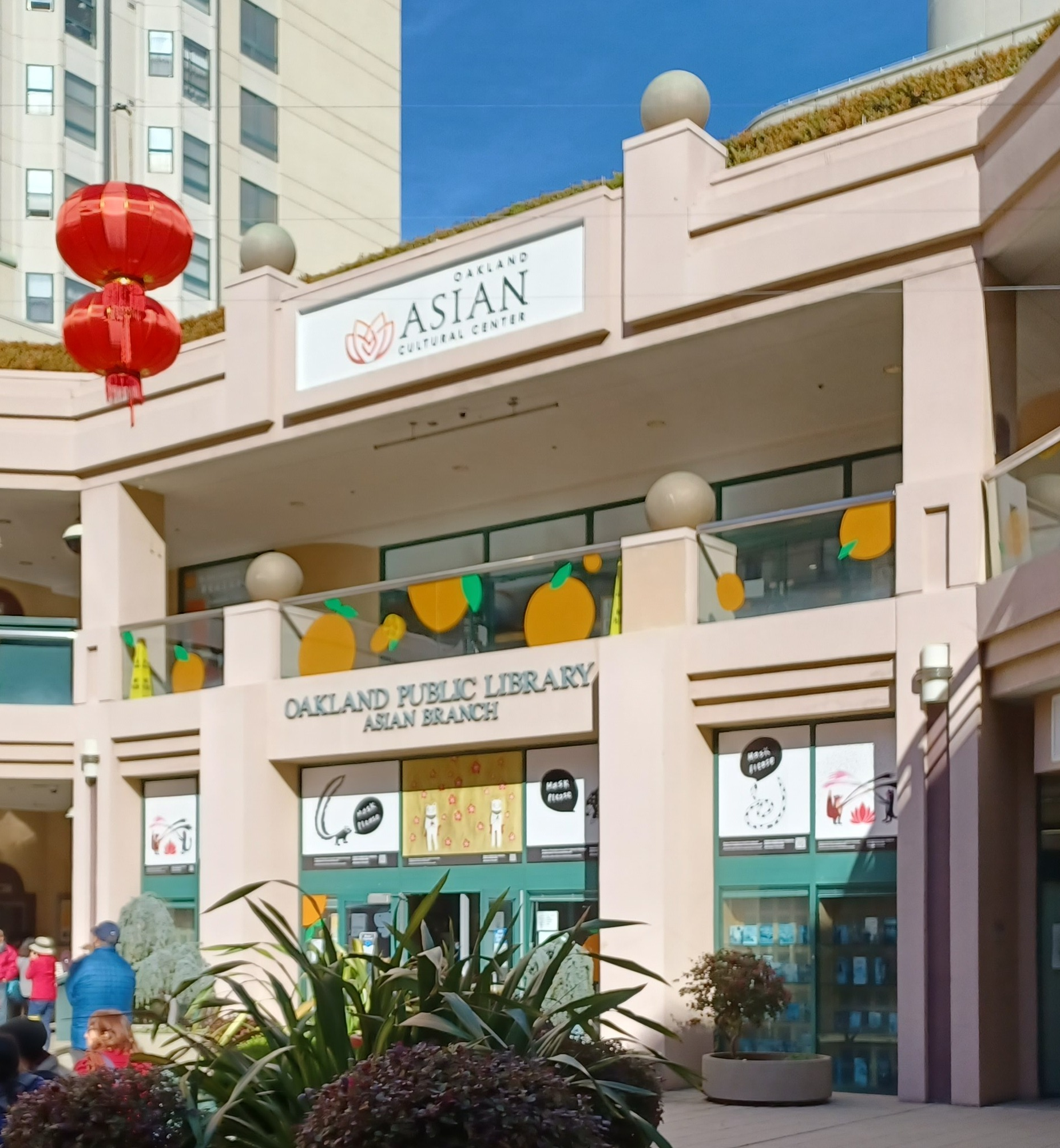
Asian Branch Library

The Asian Branch Library is one of many of Oakland Public Library's branches and is located in Chinatown's "Pacific Renaissance Plaza." The Asian Library is unique among public library branches in the United States as it houses eight Asian languages (Chinese, Japanese, Korean, Vietnamese, Thai, Cambodian, Tagalog and Laotian) in major reference titles and general subject titles, an Asian Studies collection, in addition to an English-language Asian American collection.

The Asian Community Library was founded in 1975 as part of a Federal Library Services Construction Act grant to create a model library serving the Asian community in Oakland with multilingual staff and collections. It shared space with the Park Boulevard Branch at 1934 Park Blvd which was 1.5 miles from Chinatown. To improve access to Asian patrons it operated the Asian Bookmobile in Chinatown and Berkeley. In 1978, it moved to the Main Library about 0.5 miles from Chinatown. In 1981, it moved to a storefront among Chinatown shops and food stores in the 15 story City Center Plaza condos building at 449 9th Street at Broadway becoming the Asian Branch Library. The current location in the Pacific Renaissance Plaza opened in 1995.

=== Notable natives and residents ===
- Amy Tan, author
- Ben Fong-Torres, journalist, author, radio personality
- Bruce Lee, martial artist, actor
- Dong Kingman (1911–2000), watercolorist, created paintings for Flower Drum Song and The World of Suzie Wong
- Dr. Charles Goodall Lee (1881–1973), dentist, first licensed Chinese dentist who financed the lodge building of the Chinese American Citizens Alliance in Oakland
- Frank Chin, writer
- Fred Korematsu resisted, and then challenged in court, the forced internment of Japanese Americans during World War II (See Korematsu v. United States for more information.)
- Lew Hing (1858–1934), tycoon, founded successful cannery building an empire in banking, shipping, and real estate
- March Fong Eu, politician
- Matt Fong, politician
- Maxine Hong Kingston, writer of The Woman Warrior and China Men
- Joe Shoong, founder of the National Dollar Stores and philanthropist
- Derrick Soo, homeless advocate; 2022 Oakland mayoral candidate
- Rodney Yee, yoga instructor
- Wendy Yoshimura, watercolor artist
- William Wong, journalist and author

== Government ==
=== Representatives ===
- United States Senate represented by Laphonza Butler and Alex Padilla
- United States House of Representatives District 13 represented by Barbara Lee
  - California State Assembly District 18 represented by Mia Bonta
  - California State Senate District 9 represented by Nancy Skinner
    - Alameda County District 3 (Chinatown, Jack London, Fruitvale, and San Antonio portions of Oakland, Alameda, San Leandro, San Lorenzo, Hayward Acres) represented by Lena Tam.
      - Oakland City Council District 2 (Grand Lake-Chinatown) represented by Charlene Wang.
      - Oakland Mayor Barbara Lee.

=== Police and fire ===
The Oakland Police Department's Administration Building is located at 455 Seventh St.

Chinatown is in Oakland Police Department's Beat 3X. The Community Services Section hosts the Asian Advisory Committee on Crime and the Asian Youth Services Committee.

The Chinatown Neighborhood Crime Prevention Council for beat 3x, a neighborhood community-policing board meets monthly. Meetings are conducted in Cantonese and are open to all.

Oakland Fire Department, Fire Station No. 12 is located at 822 Alice Street at 9th Street. Fire Engine 12 is assigned to this fire station. The citizens of Oakland and the Oakland Fire Department will remember the service and sacrifice of Oakland Engine Company No. 12. Hoseman Tracy Toomey who died in the line of duty on January 10, 1999 in a 2-story building collapse after responding to a 6-alarm fire on upper Broadway.

== Infrastructure ==
=== Transportation ===
Located at the crossroads of the 880 freeway, the tubes linking Alameda and Oakland, and downtown, Oakland Chinatown bears a significant burden imposed by automobile traffic that dates back to the 1950s. The traffic on I-880 exceeds 100,000 cars per day. Weekday and everyday commerce in the area creates thousands of peak period private automobile trips daily and resulting air pollution adversely affects the health of the neighborhood's elderly residents. Over 20,000 shoppers and tourists use its sidewalks every weekend.

The neighborhood is connected to I-880 at an off-ramp (at 6th and Oak) and a corresponding on-ramp (at 5th and Oak); it also is connected to I-980 at off-ramps (at 6th & Broadway and 5th & Jackson) and an on-ramp (at 6th and Jackson). Oakland's Public Works Agency reconfigured travel lanes on Jackson Street to separate traffic travelling south on Jackson from traffic merging into Jackson from the slip lane of eastbound 7th Street. This effectively eliminated any possibility of the lost art of the alternating "zipper" merge, initially through signs and later updated with flex posts added around 2014.

The volume of automobile traffic travelling away from the core of Chinatown on 7th Street towards these freeway connections remains heavy and unrelenting, resulting in numerous instances of drivers striking pedestrians. In fact, Chinatown has the highest concentration of automobiles colliding with pedestrians and bicycles in the City of Oakland; 30% of Chinatown's streets are on Oakland's High Injury Network, defined as the 6% of streets city-wide that see 63% of severe and fatal crashes.

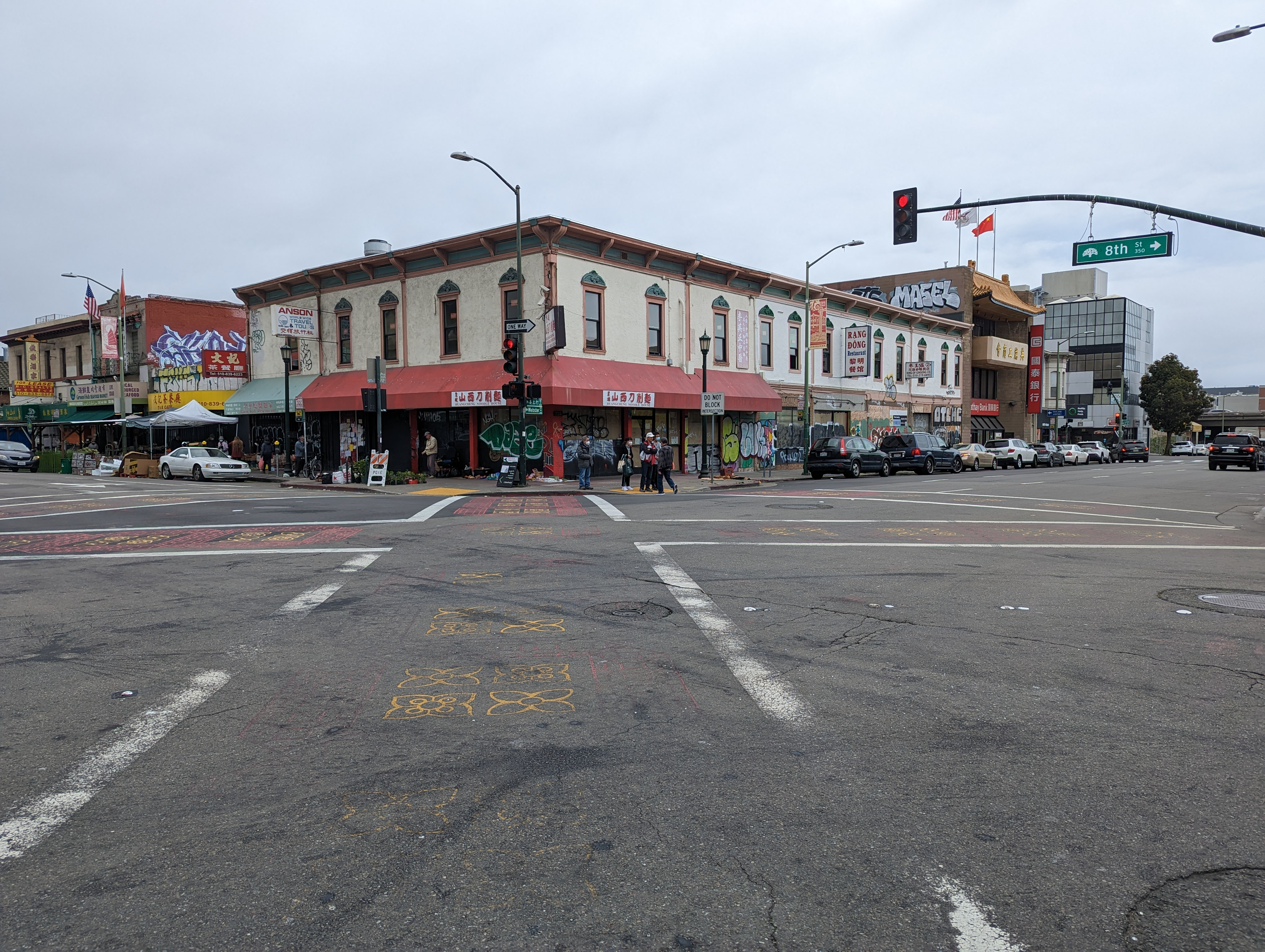
Scramble intersection at 8th and Webster

A safety campaign resulted in the first pedestrian scramble system in Alameda County, implemented in 2002 at the intersection of 8th and Webster to reduce pedestrian fatalities and injuries; it subsequently was expanded to four intersections (8th/9th and Webster/Franklin) in 2004. In addition, the I-880 Oakland Alameda Access Project, sponsored by the Alameda County Transportation Commission (CTC), is intended to improve connectivity between I-880/I-980 and Alameda, via the Posey and Webster Street Tubes. Currently, motorists must travel along busy Chinatown streets between the tubes and the freeway, and a more direct connection will reduce conflicts between cars and pedestrians. Caltrans and Alameda CTC propose to remove and reconfigure the freeway off-ramps in the area to reconfigure traffic flows.

Until recently, California Auto Insurance company actuarial models charged higher rates to residents in the Chinatown's zip code under a practice known as territorial rating, or zip code profiling. The insurance actuarial theory behind this market practice purports that drivers residing or "principally garaging" their cars in a certain area face a greater loss and accident ratio. This practice was outlawed by California voters in 1988 by Proposition 103 on the statewide ballot. The law made its way through the courts for 18 years before several insurance companies settled with California Insurance Commissioner John Garamendi in 2006 to put an end to the practice.

Chinatown residents are twice as likely to take transit as residents city-wide, and 38% of households do not have access to a private motor vehicle. Many visitors to the neighborhood also use nearby mass transit connections. Oakland Chinatown is served by several AC Transit bus lines which run on 7th, 8th, 11th, 12th, Broadway, and Franklin Streets, including Line 1T (Tempo) bus rapid transit service along 11th/12th, with Chinatown stops straddling Madison, Harrison, and Broadway. The neighborhood has two BART stations nearby: 12th Street Oakland City Center station on its northwest corner, and Lake Merritt station at its eastern edge.

=== Education ===
==== Public schools ====
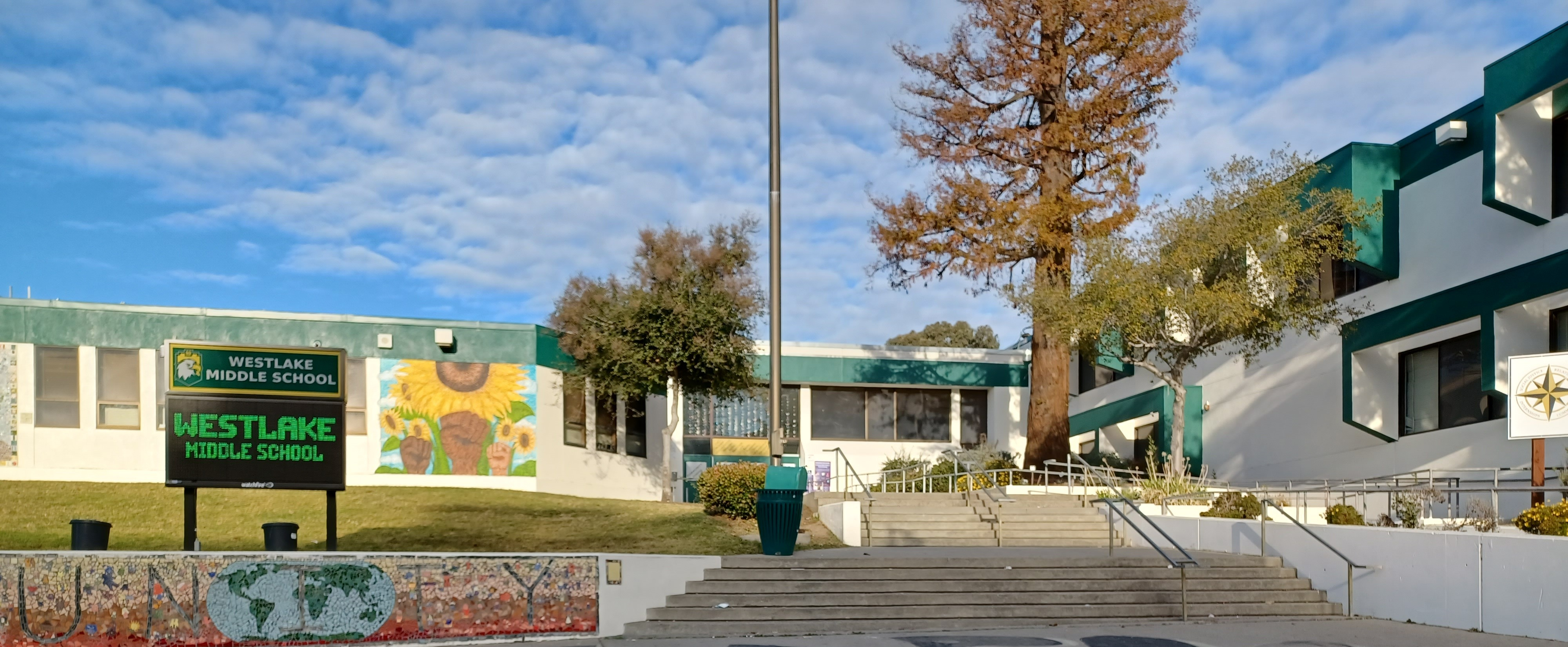
Westlake Middle School

Residents of Chinatown are zoned to schools in the Oakland Unified School District. Zoned schools include:Lincoln Elementary School (K-5), Westlake Middle School, and Oakland Technical High School.

American Indian Public Charter School II, a charter school campus of the American Indian Model Schools system, is located in Chinatown. It caters to students living in the Chinatown and Lake Merritt areas. In 2008 it shared a campus with Oakland Charter Academies (now Amethod Public Schools).

The Lighthouse Community Charter School was established in Oakland's Chinatown in the 2004 – 2005 school year with grades K-2 and 6–8 and later expanded to serve grades K – 12. In the 2009–2010 school year, the school relocated to a facility close to the Oakland airport.

Yu Ming Charter School, is a Mandarin immersion charter school. Formerly located at 321 10th Street, the school moved to 1086 Alcatraz Avenue in February 2013.

==== Colleges and universities ====
Laney College is a community college located at the south end of Chinatown. Course offerings include Asian and Asian American Studies, Chinese language, Japanese language, and Chinese Opera (Music Department). It is a part of the Peralta Community College District.

Cal State East Bay has the Oakland Professional Development and Conference Center at Broadway and 11th Street. Continuing education courses includes a certificate program in Teaching Chinese as a Heritage or Other Language.

==== Other education services ====
The Shoong Family Chinese Cultural Center on 9th Street at Harrison runs a Chinese school with after-school and weekend classes in Cantonese and Mandarin. The Center was established in 1953 by philanthropist Joe Shoong.

=== Healthcare ===
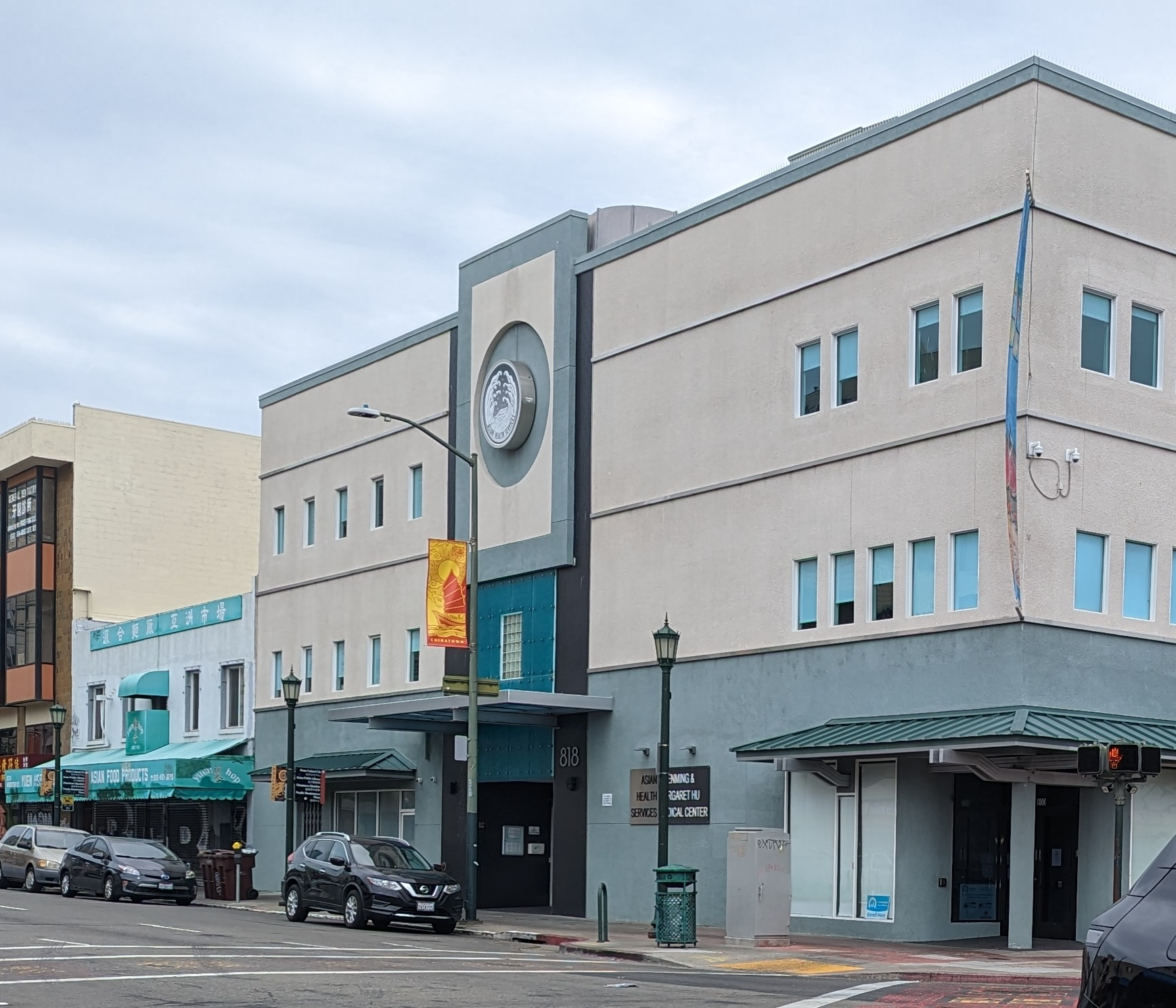
Chenming and Margaret Hu Medical Center

A source of healthcare for the surrounding community include Asian Health Services. Since 1974, they have provided the densely populated Asian community with health services including mental health, dental care, advocacy and opportunities to participate in community leadership. "To serve and advocate for the medically underserved, including the immigrant and refugee Asian community...", is an integral part of their mission statement.

There are several Asian Health Services buildings in Chinatown, centered on 8th and Webster, including:

- Chenming & Margaret Hu Medical Center (818 Webster)
- Rolland & Kathryn Lowe Medical Center (835 Webster)
- ARC Clinic (817 Harrison)
- Main Dental Clinic (345 9th)
- Mental Health (310 8th)

== See also ==
- History of Chinese Americans in San Francisco
- Jack London Square
- Lakeside Apartments District
- List of ethnic enclaves in North American cities
- Oakland City Center
- Old Oakland
