= Charles Goodall Lee =

Chinese-American dentist

Charles Goodall Lee (1881 – 1973) was an American dentist and the first licensed Chinese American dentist in California. Lee financed the construction of the Chinese American Citizens Alliance lodge in Oakland, California. He graduated from the School of Dentistry at the University of the Pacific.

Lee was born in 1881 in San Francisco, California, to Lee Tong Hay, a lay leader of the forming Chinese Methodist Church associated with Otis Gibson's missions that would become the Chinese Community United Methodist Church.

After the 1906 San Francisco earthquake, Lee relocated to San Jose, California, and then settling in Oakland becoming Oakland Chinatown's first dentist. His practice continued until his retirement in 1940. He was an active participant in civil affairs founding Oakland's Chinese American Citizens Alliance in 1912. Lee was also a lay leader of the Chinese Community Methodist Church of Oakland, a member of the Oakland Chinese Center, and a member of the Lee Family Benevolent Association.

He was married to Clara Elizabeth Chan, who was the first Chinese American woman to register to vote in the United States.

He is interred in Oakland.

== Activism ==
In 1912, Lee became one of six men who founded the Chinese American Citizens Alliance (C.A.C.A) Oakland Lodge (members including Chew Keung, Wong W. Kai, Jow Pong and Chancey Chan). The organization was formally named Native Sons of the Golden State, but after the earthquake of 1906 some members moved across the Bay to Oakland where there was a growing number of Chinese Americans. All of the founding men took the opportunity to purchase a building for the organization by each placing a deposit down for the headquarters. Complications arose after purchasing the building when the previous tenants required the members to pay “remodeling fees” before they were able to move in. So, all the members proceeded to pay for these repair fees with their own money, as well still coming together to buy the building. Lee contributed the largest payment for the purchasing of the building as well as the repair fees. As a member of the Oakland Lodge, Lee fought for the civil rights, equal economical and political opportunities, and the general welfare of Chinese Americans.

== Lee Benevolent Association ==
Lee and his wife, Elizabeth, were also members of the Lee Family Benevolent Association.

== Chinese Community Methodist Church ==
Lee became a lay leader in the church after he established his dental practice in the early 1900s.
