= Otis Gibson =

American pioneer Methodist missionary and pastor (1826-1889)

The Reverend Otis Gibson
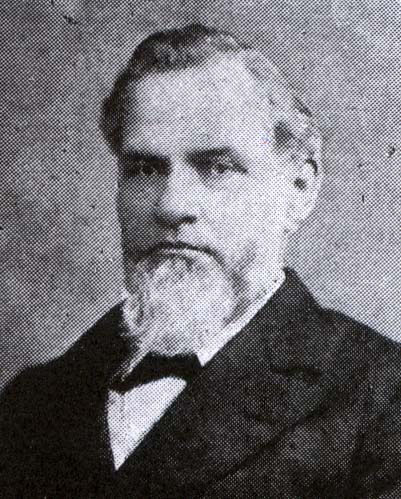
- Born: December 8, 1826; Moira, New York
- Died: January 25, 1889 (aged 62); San Francisco, California
- Spouse: Eliza Chamberlain
- Children: 3

Otis Gibson (simplified Chinese: 基顺; traditional Chinese: 基順; Pinyin: Jīshùn; Foochow Romanized: Gĭ-sông; December 8, 1826 – January 25, 1889) was a Methodist pastor, best known for his missionary work to the Chinese in Fuzhou, China and in San Francisco, California.

== Life ==
=== Early life ===
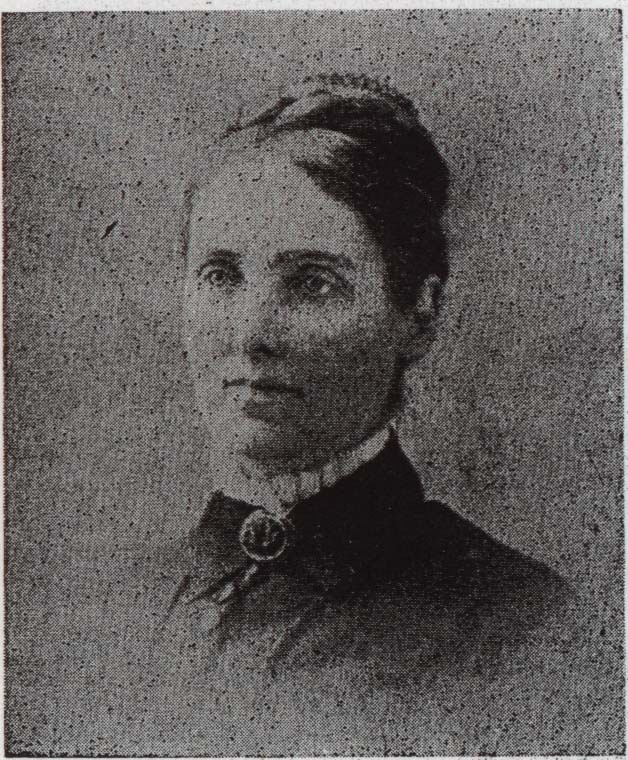
Eliza Gibson (1830–1916)

Born on a farm in Moira, New York, Otis Gibson had five brothers and one sister. He was converted at the age of 13 after the sudden death of his brother. When he was 19, he joined the Methodist Episcopal Church. In the early 1850s he attended Dickinson College. Later he became a teacher and went to a Quaker settlement in Maryland to teach, where he met his wife-to-be Eliza Chamberlain.

Shortly before he graduated from college, Otis Gibson decided to go into the ministry and was appointed as a missionary to Fuzhou. He graduated in June 1854 with a D.D. and was licensed to preach on 4 November the same year. A few months before he and Eliza were sent to China, they got married in a Methodist Camp Meeting.

=== Missionary work in China ===
Otis Gibson's ordination was given in 1854, but his scheduled sail had to be postponed till spring the next year because the recording secretary forgot to record the recommendation. On April 3, 1855 Gibson and wife set sail from New York Harbor on a clipper ship bound for Shanghai. On that day Gibson wrote, "Believing that God ordered our course, we feel content and satisfied that all is for the best." Finally they reached Fuzhou on August 13, 1855, following Gibson's teacher Erastus Wentworth with whom he got acquainted at Dickinson College.

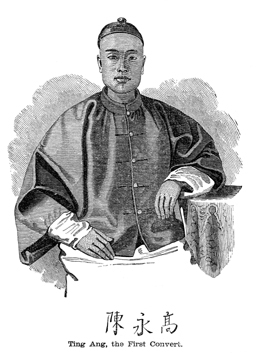
Ting Ang, the first Methodist convert in China

In 1856, Otis Gibson and his Methodist co-laborers established two churches in the city, namely, Church of the True God and Church of Heavenly Peace, which were the first two Methodist churches built in East Asia. On December 26, 1856, Gibson purchased a place in the South bank of River Min and established there in 1859 a commodious wooden Western-style boarding school for laymen and ministers. In the 1860s Gibson also helped in the translation work of the Bible and other Christian books into the local Fuzhou dialect.

On June 14, 1857, Otis Gibson and Robert S. Maclay baptized their first convert, a native tradesman named Ting Ang (陈安). Some weeks later he and Maclay made an unannounced visit to Ting Ang's house and found no sign of idols.

During his tenure in China, Gibson also started the Methodist mission in Yanping (part of Nanping) in 1864. There Gibson succeeded in renting a small house for use as a chapel, but he was faced with strong opposition. Soon afterwards, he went back with Eliza to the United States, and his work in Yanping was continued by Nathan Sites and other Methodist missionaries.

=== Life back in America ===
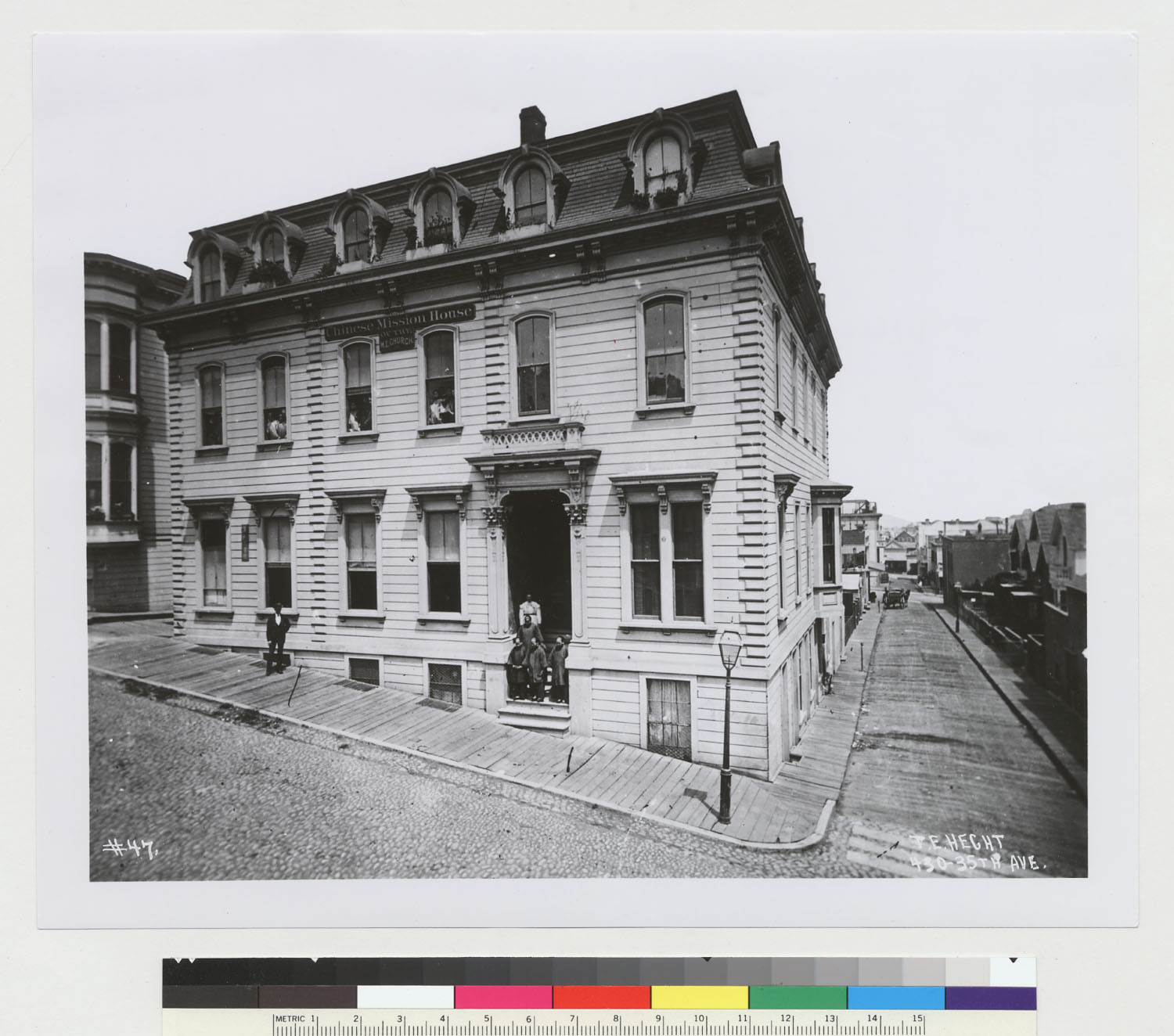
Chinese Mission House (1880s), 916 Washington Street in San Francisco's Chinatown. Established 1870 by Rev. Otis T. Gibson as the "Chinese Mission Institute".

Due to his wife Eliza's failing health, Otis Gibson left China with her in 1865 and returned to Moira, New York as a pastor. In 1868 he was assigned to San Francisco, California as superintendent of the Methodist Church's "Chinese Domestic Mission" designed to minister to the swelling number of Chinese immigrants in area of the California Conference. There he learned the Cantonese dialect and opened many missions and churches, including San Francisco, Oakland, Stockton, Salinas, and in the gold fields in the foothills of California, and he also wrote a Chinese-English Dictionary and translated the New Testament into Cantonese. Gibson and his wife had instituted on August 10, 1870 the Women's Missionary Society of the Pacific Coast, enlisting area Methodist women to organize the rescue and protection of exploited Chinese women of the slave trade. By the end of 1870, Rev. Gibson had erected the building of the "Chinese Mission Institute" on Washington Street in San Francisco's Chinatown. In October 1871, Gibson baptized his first convert in America, a young Chinese prostitute named Jin Ho.

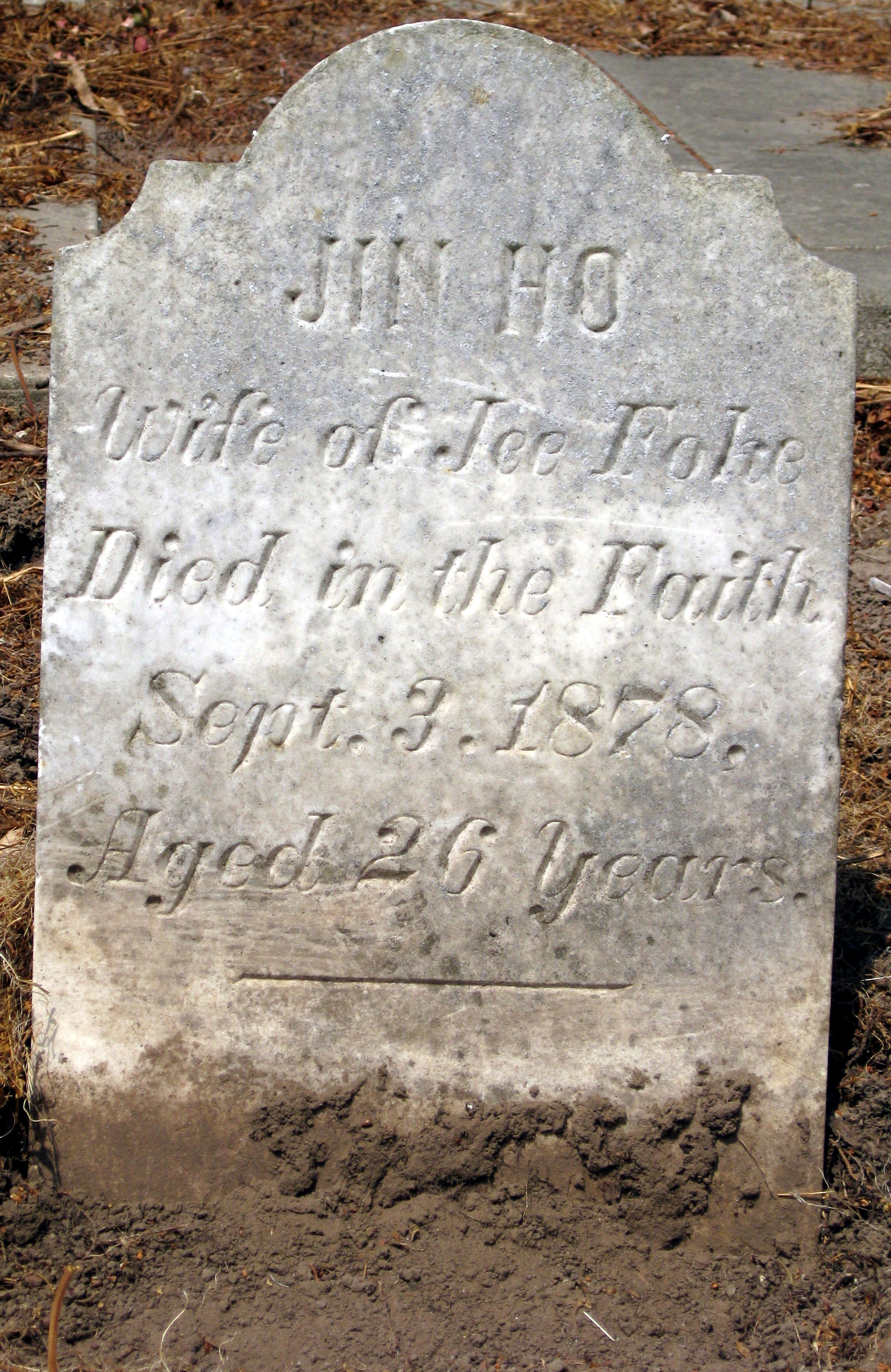
Jin Ho's tombstone in the Chinese Christian Cemetery of San Francisco

In his later life, Otis Gibson made untiring and courageous efforts in behalf of the poor and the wronged of the Chinese on the Pacific Coast. In his landmark work The Chinese in America (唐人在金山, ISBN 0-405-11272-6) which was published in 1877, Gibson concluded his polemic against the anti-Chinese arguments with a noble restatement of the American ideal:

The doors of our country are open equally... We have room for all. Ours is the "land of the free, and the home of the brave." The oppressed and down-trodden from all nations may alike find shelter here, and under the benign influences of our free institutions, and of our exalted faith, with the blessing of Almighty God, these different nationalities and varying civilizations shall, in time, blend into one harmonious whole, illustrating to a wondering world the common Fatherhood of God, and the universal brotherhood of man.

Otis Gibson was strongly anti-Catholic.

While attending a preachers meeting in 1884 Gibson was stricken with paralysis. He died in San Francisco after a long illness on January 25, 1889, at the home of his son. His funeral service was attended by Chinese, Japanese, and American friends, and he was buried at the Odd Fellows cemetery.

=== Family life ===
Otis Gibson and Eliza had two sons while in China. One died in infancy. The other son, William F. Gibson, became an attorney; represented in 1885 a Chinese couple in San Francisco who filed a landmark lawsuit against the school superintendent for barring their American-born daughter from attending public school; and died in 1902 at age 46. Only daughter was Myra Alice Gibson.

== Legacy ==
Otis Gibson started in 1868 the first Methodist ministry to the Chinese in America with a mission in San Francisco. The great 1906 earthquake and fire destroyed Gibson's Washington Street building that housed the Chinese Mission, along with most of San Francisco Chinatown. In 1911, after five years of displacement and fund raising, the Chinese Methodist Church was rebuilt on the corner of Washington and Stockton Streets.

Otis Gibson was also the first pastor to the Japanese on the Pacific coast. When the first Japanese church in America was dedicated in San Francisco in 1894, he was memorialized in the west window stain glass of the Japanese Church on Pine Street.

== See also ==
- Women's Missionary Society of the Pacific Coast
- Charles Goodall Lee
- William Speer (minister)
