= Women's Missionary Society of the Pacific Coast =

Methodist agency for women in San Francisco Chinatown

Coordinates: 37°47′42″N 122°24′32″W

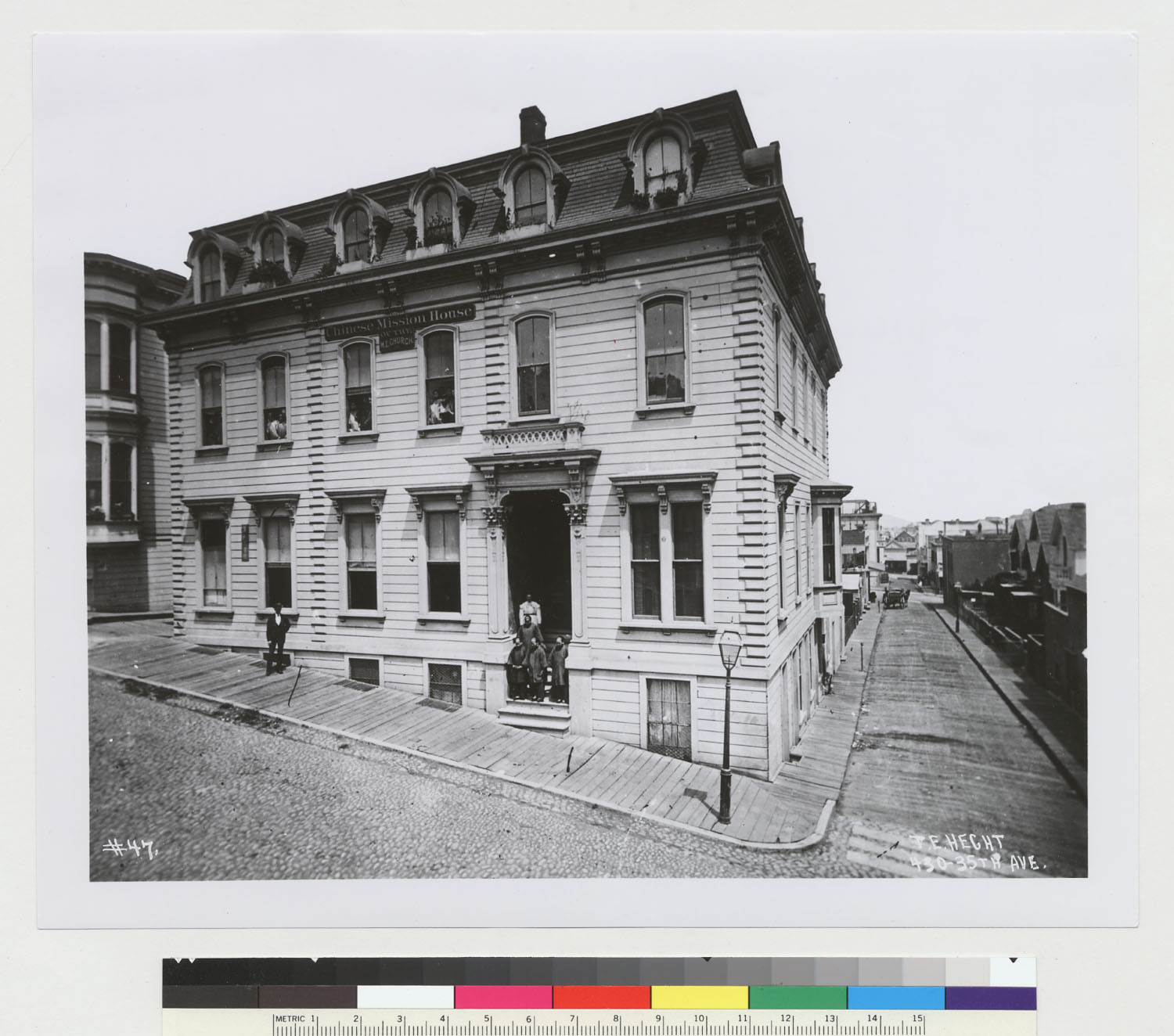
Chinese Mission House (1880s), 916 Washington Street. Established 1870 as the "Chinese Mission Institute" or "Oriental Home for Women and Girls" by Methodist Rev. Otis T. Gibson.

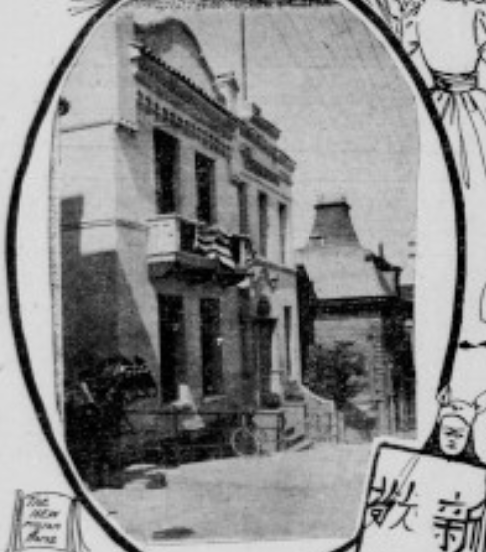
Oriental Home and School for Women and Girls, 912 Washington St, San Francisco Chinatown; dedicated by the Methodist Women's Home Missionary Society, 1901

The Women's Missionary Society of the Pacific Coast of the Methodist Episcopal Church was founded on October 29, 1870 by Methodist Rev. Otis T. Gibson, with eleven women he recruited in August 1870, for the purpose of working among the slave girls in Chinatown, San Francisco, California. By the end of 1870, Rev. Gibson had erected the building of the "Chinese Mission Institute". In October 1871, the first woman, Jin Ho, was rescued from the bay where she had attempted suicide. She then worked in a Christian family and in two years married a Christian Chinese. In 1873 a school was opened with Miss L. S. Templeton as teacher. The school mainly taught English and other necessary skills to Chinese and Japanese women and girls who had been rescued from slavery or prostitution in San Francisco Chinatown.

The "Oriental Home and School", as the home was sometimes called, was run by the Women's Missionary Society of the Pacific Coast. In 1893, after formal recognition of its work by the Women's Home Missionary Society, it was incorporated into the larger Women's Home Missionary Society. Together they worked to rescue and educate young women. By 1901, about 500 women and girls had been helped. That same year, a two-story concrete building with 22 rooms, the "Oriental Home for Women and Girls" at 912 Washington Street in San Francisco's Chinatown, was dedicated by the Women's Home Missionary Society. Unfortunately, this building, along with most of San Francisco Chinatown, was destroyed by the 1906 earthquake and fire.

"This work [among slave girls] ought to have the endorsement of every right-thinking person, whether black, white, brown or yellow." -- Ho Yow, the Imperial Consul General to the United States, at the 1901 dedication.

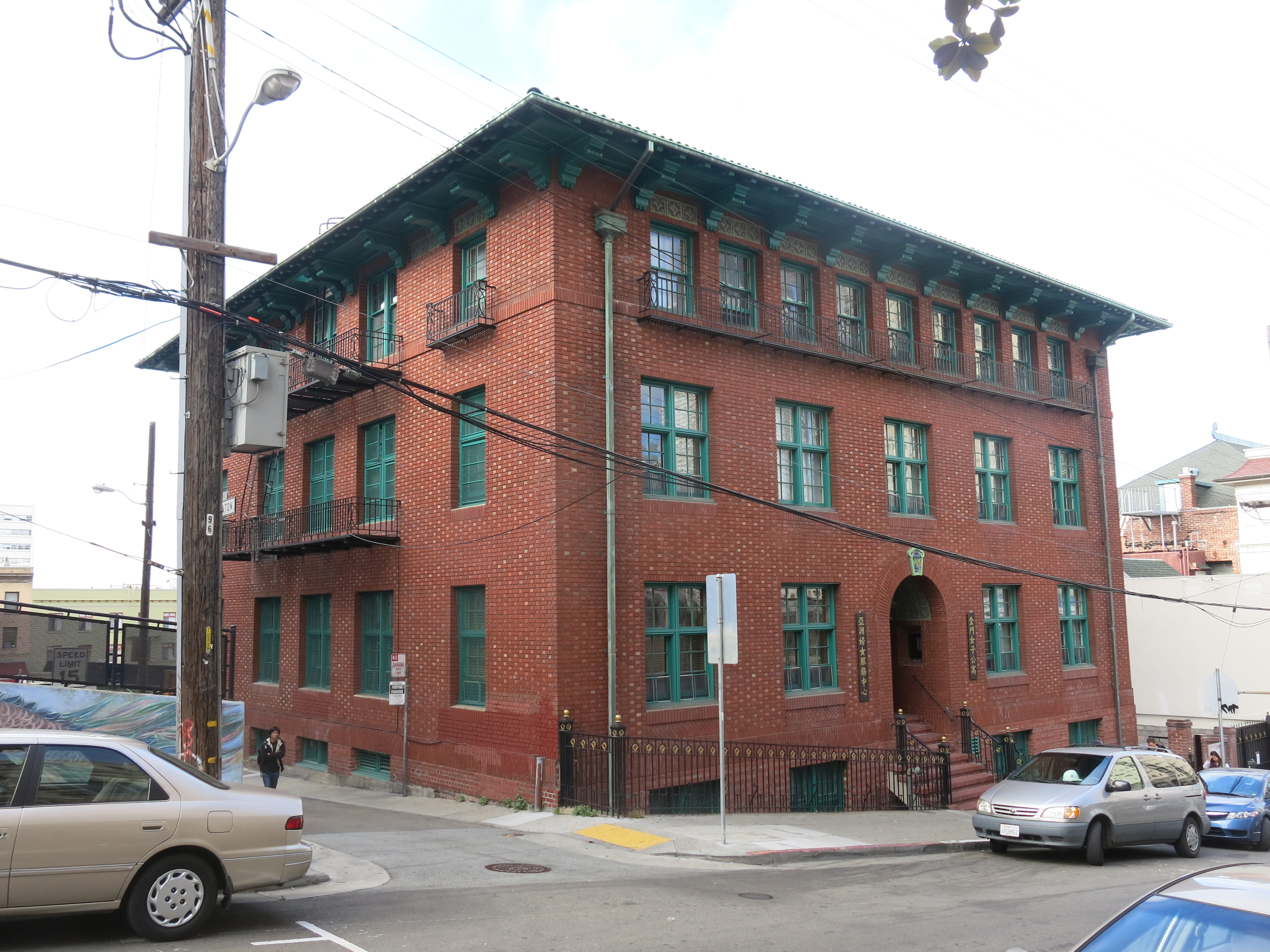
Gum Moon Women's Residence (2013), 940 Washington St., San Francisco Chinatown, designed by Julia Morgan; dedicated by the Methodist Women's Home Missionary Society, 1912

After the great quake and fire, Julia Morgan designed the replacement residence, a new three-story brick building with accommodations for 60 to 70 girls -- orphaned, rescued or abandoned. It was built at 940 Washington Street in San Francisco Chinatown and was dedicated by the Women's Home Missionary Society in 1912. Meanwhile, the Chinese Methodist Church was rebuilt in 1911 on the corner of Washington and Stockton Streets at 920 Washington Street. Later in the 1940s, the three-story brick building at 940 Washington Street, designed by Julia Morgan for the "Oriental Home", was renamed the Gum Moon Women's Residence.

== See also ==
- List of works by Julia Morgan
