= List of Nevada suffragists =

This is a list of Nevada suffragists, suffrage groups and others associated with the cause of women's suffrage in Nevada.

== Groups ==
- Churchill County Equal Suffrage League.
- Douglas County Equal Suffrage League.
- Esmerelda County Equal Suffrage League.
- Eureka County Equal Suffrage League.
- Humboldt County Equal Suffrage League.
- Lucy Stone Non-Partisan Equal Suffrage League, formed in Austin, Nevada in 1894.
- The Men's League of Nevada, created in 1914.
- Nevada Equal Franchise Society (NEFS).
- Nevada Equal Suffrage Association, formed in 1895.
- Nevada Federation of Women's Clubs.
- Non-Militant Suffrage Association, formed in 1911.
- Ormsby County Equal Suffrage League.
- Sparks Equal Suffrage League.
- State Equal Suffrage Association.
- Storey County Equal Suffrage League.
- Washoe County Equal Suffrage League.
- Women's Christian Temperance Union (WCTU).

== Suffragists ==
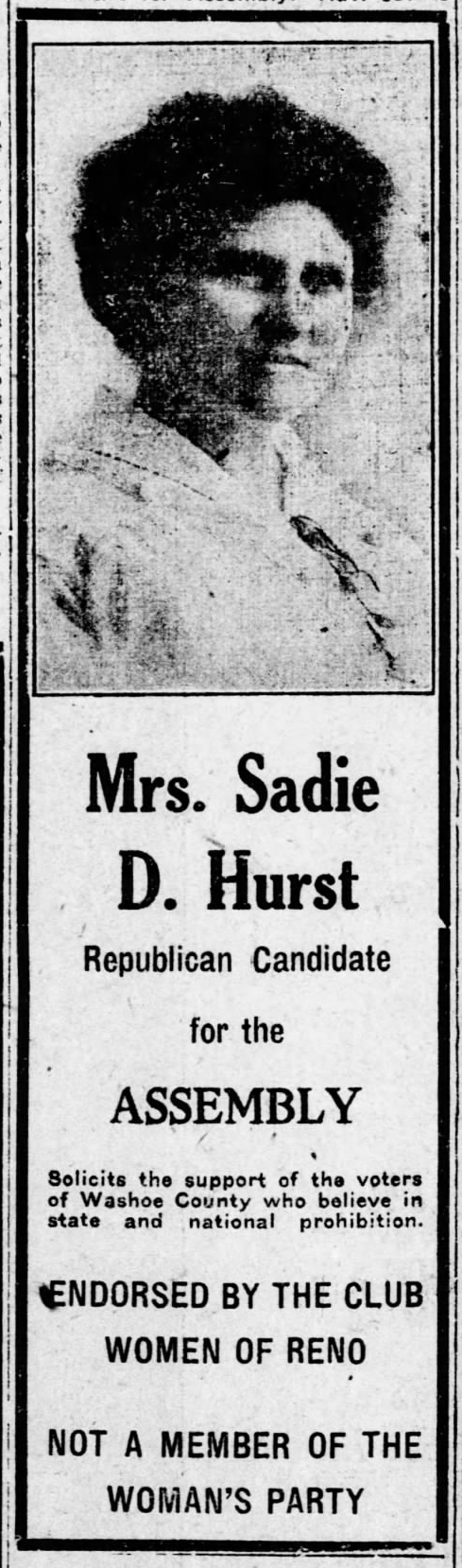
Sadie D. Hurst for Nevada Assembly ad, November 4, 1918

- Mary Babcock.
- Hellen Ann Lovelock Bonnifield (Winnemucca).
- Mae Caine
- Hanna K. Clapp.
- Felice Cohn (Carson City).
- Eliza Cook (Douglas County).
- Mary Stoddard Doten.
- Bessie R. Lucas Eichelberger (Reno and Washoe County).
- Minnie Flannigan.
- Maud Gassoway.
- John I. Ginn (Elko).
- Laura DeForce Gordon (Virginia City).
- Florence Humphrey (Washoe).
- Sadie D. Hurst (Washoe).
- Alexandrine La Tourette.
- Sarah Emeline Mack (Reno).
- Anne Henrietta Martin (Reno).
- Mila Tupper Maynard (Reno).
- Helena Suzanne Bidwell Norton (Reno).
- Elda Ann Williams Simpson Orr (Reno).
- Fannie Brown Patrick (Reno)
- Delphine Anderson Squires (Las Vegas).
- Fannie Weller (Austin).
- Frances Slaven Williamson (Austin and Reno).
- Bird Wilson (Goldfield).
- Jeanne Wier.

=== Politicians who supported women's suffrage ===
- McKaskia Stearns Bonnifield (Humboldt County).
- Oscar Grey.
- Curtis J. Hillyer (Storey County).

== Publications ==
- The Nevada Citizen, published by Frances Slaven Williamson and Mary Laura Williamson.

== Suffragists who campaigned in Nevada ==
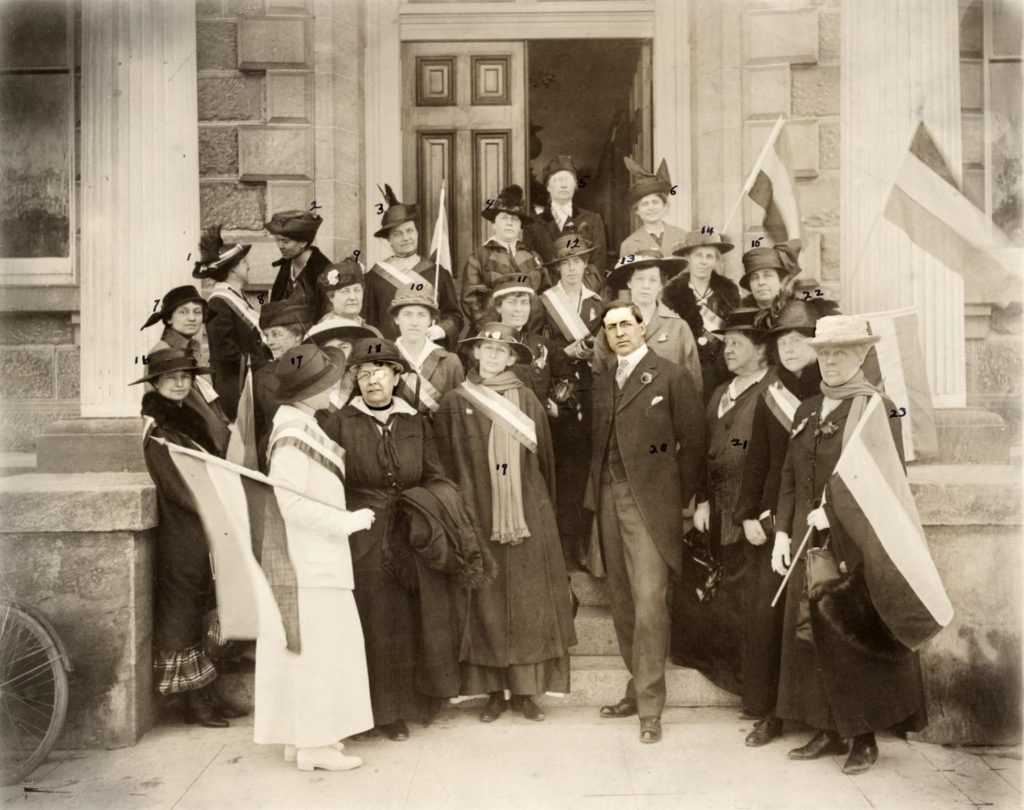
Suffrage Special women in Carson City meeting with the governor, April 27, 1916

- Jane Addams.
- Susan B. Anthony.
- Bessie Beatty.
- Harriot Stanton Blatch.
- Lucy Burns.
- Laura Gregg Cannon.
- Carrie Chapman Catt.
- Anne Constable.
- Grace Cotterill.
- Minnie Fisher Cunningham.
- Emma Smith DeVoe.
- Sara Bard Field.
- Margaret A. Foley.
- Antoinette Funk.
- Charlotte Perkins Gilman.
- Florence Bayard Hilles.
- Rosalie Jones.
- Caroline Katzenstein.
- Annie Kenney.
- Harriet Burton Laidlaw.
- James Lees Laidlaw.
- Gail Laughlin.
- Maud Leonard McCreery.
- Alice Park.
- Valeria H. Parker.
- Ella Riegel.
- Mary E. Ringrose.
- Elizabeth Selden Rogers.
- Marjorie Shuler.
- Anna Howard Shaw.
- Mary Sperry.
- Elizabeth Cady Stanton.
- Emily A. Pitts Stevens.
- Eleanor Stewart.
- Helen Todd.
- Mabel Vernon.
- Charlotte Anita Whitney.
- Maud Younger.

== Anti-suffragists ==
People

- Emma Adams.
- Anna Fitch.
- George Wingfield.

Groups

- Nevada Association of Women Opposed to Equal Suffrage (NAWOWS).

Anti-suffragists who campaigned in Nevada

- Minnie Bronson.

== See also ==
- Timeline of women's suffrage in Nevada
- Women's suffrage in Nevada
- Women's suffrage in states of the United States
- Women's suffrage in the United States
