= Mae Caine =

- Born: March 15, 1872; Wells, Nevada
- Died: August 24, 1955 (aged 83); Elko County, Nevada
- Other names: Mary E. Griffin, Mrs. E.E. Caine
- Occupations: Suffragist, city government official, and women's rights activist
- Spouse: Edwin E. Caine (m. 1898)
- Parent(s): James J. Griffin and Maria Hanafin Griffin

Mae Caine (March 15, 1872 – August 24, 1955) was a 20th-century American suffragist and women's rights activist, civic leader, and government official in Nevada. President of the Suffrage Society in Elko County, she was also a vice president of the Nevada Equal Franchise Society, and a delegate from Nevada to the 45th convention of the National American Woman Suffrage Association in Washington, D.C.

== Formative years and family ==
Born as Mary E. Griffin in Wells, Nevada on March 15, 1872, Mae Caine was a daughter of James J. Griffin and Maria Hanafin Griffin. On August 30, 1898, she wed Edwin E. Caine in Ogden, Utah. They had three children, only one of whom—Paul Caine—survived to adulthood. Her husband, who was employed as a principal at a local school during the early years of their union, subsequently became a lawyer and an unsuccessful candidate for the U.S. Congress. She was widowed by him in 1922.

== Suffrage work and political career ==
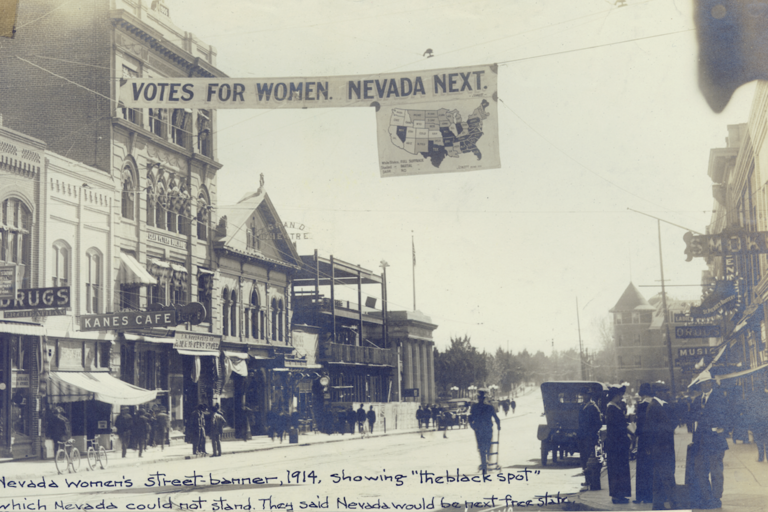
Nevada Equal Franchise Society banner, Reno, Nevada, c. 1914.

Elected president of her local suffrage society in Elko County, Nevada on May 17, 1912, Mae Caine was also active at the national and state levels of the women's suffrage movement in the United States. Appointed as a Nevada delegate to the National American Woman Suffrage Association Convention, which was held in Washington, D.C. from November 29 to December 5, 1913, she was also appointed and elected to leadership positions with the Nevada Equal Franchise Society—first as her county's representative—and then, in 1913 and 1914, as vice president. As her national profile grew and her schedule became more hectic, she resigned from her leadership role at the county level in 1914. When Nevada Equal Franchise Society leaders launched the Nevada Women's Civic League in February 1915, she was elected as vice president of that new organization. Among the issues that she and her fellow civic league members worked on in 1915 were resolutions “urging the passage of legislation relating to the eight-hour law for women; raising the age of consent to 18 years; a teachers’ pension bill; a community property law for the better protection of the widow or wife; deploring the terrible suffering in the European war; favoring a national suffrage amendment,” as well as “protests against signing of assembly bill No. 11—the divorce measure.”

A member of the Nevada Federation of Women's Clubs, she also subsequently became a member of the Elko Twentieth Century Club—an organization she remained involved with for more than three decades. Among her accomplishments, she helped to create a public library in Elko and became its first librarian in 1926.

In 1927, she was appointed as the county clerk for Elko County, Nevada, a position she held until 1950.

== Death and interment ==
Mae E. Caine died in Elko County on August 24, 1955, at the age of 83, and was interred at that county's Burns Memorial Garden Catholic Cemetery.

== See also ==
- List of Nevada suffragists
- Timeline of women's suffrage in Nevada
- Women's suffrage in Nevada
