= Women's suffrage in Nevada =

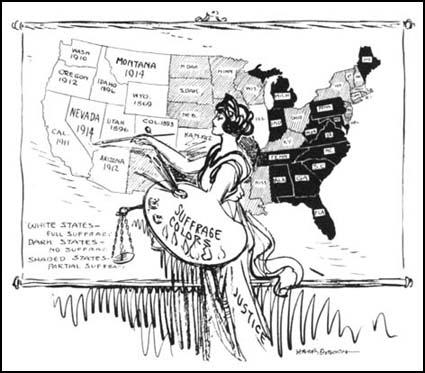
"Two More Bright Spots on the Map" by Harry Osborn, November 14, 1914

Women's suffrage began in Nevada in the late 1860s. Lecturer and suffragist Laura de Force Gordon started giving women's suffrage speeches in the state starting in 1867. In 1869, Assemblyman Curtis J. Hillyer introduced a women's suffrage resolution in the Nevada Legislature. He also spoke out on women's rights. Hillyer's resolution passed, but like all proposed amendments to the state constitution, must pass one more time and then go out to a voter referendum. In 1870, Nevada held its first women's suffrage convention in Battle Mountain Station. In the late 1880s, women gained the right to run for school offices and the next year several women are elected to office. A few suffrage associations were formed in the mid-1890s, with a state group operating a few women's suffrage conventions. However, after 1899, most suffrage work slowed down or stopped altogether. In 1911, the Nevada Equal Franchise Society (NEFS) was formed. Attorney Felice Cohn wrote a women's suffrage resolution that was accepted and passed the Nevada Legislature. The resolution passed again in 1913 and will go out to the voters on November 3, 1914. Suffragists in the state organized heavily for the 1914 vote. Anne Henrietta Martin brought in suffragists and trade unionists from other states to help campaign. Martin and Mabel Vernon traveled around the state in a rented Ford Model T, covering thousands of miles. Suffragists in Nevada visited mining towns and even went down into mines to talk to voters. On November 3, the voters of Nevada voted overwhelmingly for women's suffrage. Even though Nevada women won the vote, they did not stop campaigning for women's suffrage. Nevada suffragists aided other states' campaigns and worked towards securing a federal suffrage amendment. On February 7, 1920, Nevada became the 28th state to ratify the Nineteenth Amendment.

== Early efforts ==
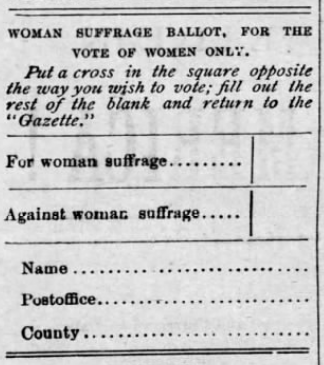
Newspaper poll for women's suffrage, Reno Gazette-Journal, January 7, 1895

Laura de Force Gordon, a lecturer and suffragist, came to Nevada in 1867. She had large audiences for her appearances in Gold Hill and Virginia City. Gordon left for California after a few weeks but returned to speak throughout Nevada in 1868. In these later talks, she focused more on women's suffrage. Gordon's speeches were well covered by the press.

On February 16, 1869, Assemblyman Curtis J. Hillyer introduced a bill for equal women's suffrage in the Nevada Assembly. In addition to introducing this bill, Hillyer's speech about women deserving equal rights became famous and was printed in full and discussed in the press. Hillyer's equal suffrage amendment bill for women passed the Nevada Legislature that year. To become a state constitutional amendment, the bill would have to pass again in two years and then go out for a voter referendum.

The first women's suffrage convention in Nevada was held on July 4, 1870, at Battle Mountain Station. Gordon was at the convention along with Emily Pitts Stevens from California. Senator M. S. Bonnifield of Humboldt County and journalist, John I. Ginn, served as chair and secretary for the event. Gorden spoke at the convention, and gave a very stirring speech. The participants created a state suffrage group with Gordon as president. Gordon and Stevens campaigned in Carson, Elko, Virginia City and in mining towns throughout Humboldt County.

Hilyer's bill was considered for the second time in early 1871. Gordon was given the Assembly Chamber in the Nevada Capitol to speak for women's suffrage and she had "her audience spellbound." Unfortunately, the bill lost by a narrow margin in the Assembly in February "after a bitter struggle." Assemblyman Oscar Grey put forward an unsuccessful women's suffrage resolution in January 1873. In 1881, a Nevada Legislature joint legislative committee recommended amending the state constitution in favor of women's suffrage, but it doesn't gain full support.

In 1883, Hannah K. Clapp was among a group of women to successfully lobby the Nevada Senate to pass a women's suffrage bill. This bill did not pass the Assembly. In 1885, the legislature passed another equal suffrage resolution and like the 1869 bill, it had to be approved again in two years. In 1887, the suffrage resolution failed to pass. Positive legislation for suffragists came in the form of a resolution in 1889 that allowed women to run for school offices. The next year, several women won school trustee positions and two women, Susan Miller of Humboldt County and Josephine Taylor of Elko County, were elected as superintendents. The next legislation that expanded the rights of women happened in 1893 with the passage of a law that allowed women to work as attorneys and counselors in law. Laura May Tilden helped pass the law and became the first woman attorney in Nevada.

On November 30, 1894, the Lucy Stone Non-Partisan Equal Suffrage League was formed in Austin, Nevada with Fannie Weller as president. Frances Slaven Williamson was also involved with creating the non-partisan suffrage group. Williamson started to get her writing about women's suffrage published in newspapers around the state. The group helped lobby for another suffrage resolution in the Nevada Legislature which passed in 1895. The Lucy Stone group dissolved by late April 1895.

On May 17, 1895 Susan B. Anthony and Anna Howard Shaw visited Reno and spoke at McKissick's Opera House. Anthony and Howard suggested to the large group that a state suffrage group be formed. Emma Smith DeVoe was sent to Nevada from the National American Woman Suffrage Association (NAWSA) to help canvass the state. A state convention was held in Reno on October 29 and 30. At the convention, the State Equal Suffrage Association was formed with Williamson as president. Williamson spoke in every town in Nevada over the next year and helped organize suffrage clubs. She and her daughter, Mary Laura Williamson, also published a newspaper that promoted women's rights issues. The paper, The Nevada Citizen, was distributed throughout Nevada and also outside the state. The paper ran for two years and was funded and managed solely by the two women.

In 1897, the suffrage bill that the Lucy Stone Non-Partisan Equal Suffrage League fought for did not pass a second time. Williamson continued to canvas Nevada counties, finding a significant part of the population was in support of women's suffrage. On October 30, 1897, the third state suffrage convention was held in Carson City with 300 delegates attending. The fourth convention was held two years later, in 1899. That year, the Nevada Legislature again fails to approve an equal suffrage bill and removed the right of women to run as school superintendents. Women were only allowed to run as school trustees. The state suffrage group ceased activity around 1899. Any suffrage work that continued was carried on by the Nevada Women's Christian Temperance Union (WCTU) and other groups.

== Working for the vote ==
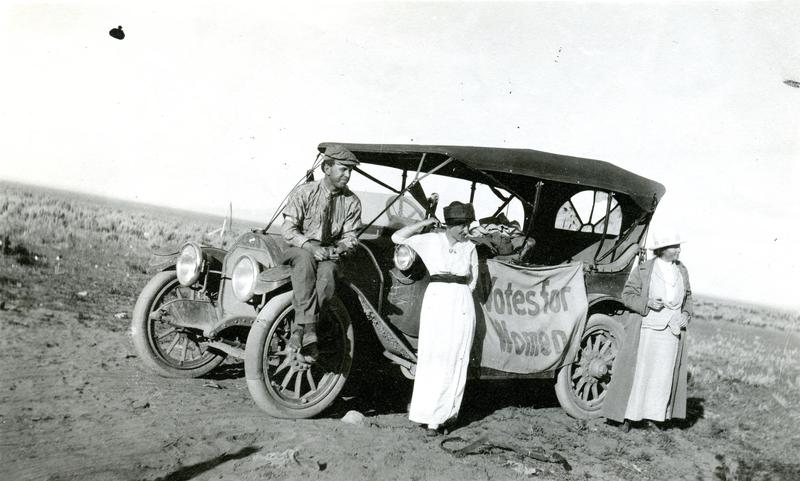
Anne Martin and Mabel Vernon campaigning for women's suffrage in Nevada, 1914.

Katherine Duer Mackay wrote to Jeanne Elizabeth Wier of the University of Nevada in November 1909 about setting up a branch of the Equal Franchise Society in Nevada. Wier visited Mackay in New York to plan a society. Wier also secured the support of several prominent people in Reno to support a group. On February 4, 1911, a large group met to form the Nevada Equal Franchise Society (NEFS) with Margaret Stanislawsky as president. After formation, the group set up a committee to lobby the legislature.

In 1911, the Nevada Legislature went on to approve more women's rights legislation. Attorney from Carson City, Felice Cohn, wrote the women's suffrage bill that passed in March 1911. Cohn also started the Non-Militant Suffrage Association which helped campaign for women's suffrage in Nevada. Members of the NEFS also worked hard to help influence the passage of Cohn's suffrage bill. The passage of this bill received both local and national attention. A six-foot banner reading "Nevada, Votes for Women" was sent from New York by Mrs. Arthur Hodges to commemorate the moment. This banner would show up in processions in Nevada, London, and in New York City. Mrs. Hodges also supported the rent for the headquarters of NEFS which was set up in Reno inside the Cheney Building.

In 1912, Anne Henrietta Martin became the president of NEFS. The group affiliated itself with NAWSA and the International Woman Suffrage Alliance (IWSA). Martin also secured more funds for the suffrage fight from attendees at the National Suffrage Convention in Philadelphia. Attorney Bird Wilson, from Goldfield wrote, published, and distributed a pamphlet called "Women Under Nevada Laws." Around 20,000 of these pamphlets were printed up and they were able to educate women with a "sense of their rights and wrongs." NEFS organized throughout Nevada counties, setting up local chapters. On member, Mrs. H. C. Taylor drove "many miles from her ranch to attend every meeting." The organization of the state allowed suffrage literature and advocacy to penetrate into all areas of the state. By October 1912, several county-level Democratic Party groups in Nevada had endorsed women's suffrage. Suffragists obtained further endorsements from the Progressive and Socialist parties. Individual Republicans gave their support, but not as a group. Labor unions were also supportive of women's suffrage in the state.

In 1913, the women's suffrage bill authored by Cohn was passed by the Nevada Legislature and would go out to a voter referendum in 1914. In October 1913 the Nevada Federation of Women's Clubs (NFWC) officially endorsed women's suffrage. Ida Husted Harper wrote that the press was important in reaching potential voters in the predominantly rural and scattered state of Nevada. Several large newspapers in Nevada were actively supportive of women's suffrage. Martin developed a press network and wrote a weekly column that was even printed in papers who did not support suffrage. The editor of the San Francisco Bulletin gave reporter Bessie Beatty time off and expenses paid so she could do publicity work in Nevada.

Martin and Mabel Vernon traveled more than 3,000 miles around the state, driving on unimproved roads campaigning. Martin rented a Ford Model T, which she sometimes used as her speaking platform. The car was able to travel an average of 15 miles a day on the dusty roads and the women sometimes slept in the car. Other times, they took very long trips, making 100 miles in one day to reach seventy voters. The suffragists called their work "prospecting for votes" and did, in fact, go down into mines by "tunnel, ladder or in buckets lowered by a windlass" to talk to voters where they worked. Vernon used the experience of the grueling trip she and Martin took to reach voters. People in Nevada had made similar journeys themselves and respected the "courage" of the suffragists to do the same.

Martin also helped the suffrage cause by raising money for the suffrage campaign and paid for her own travel expenses. She also helped bring in many seasoned suffragists and trade unionists to help her campaign, since the suffragists in Nevada had less experience in this area. One of these women, Margaret Foley, a trade unionist and suffragist, visited eight mines in Nevada, "attended fifty dances, made one thousand speeches, and wore out three pairs of shoes." Anna Howard Shaw arrived in Reno to speak on women's suffrage on October 4, 1914. Along with Shaw, many other suffragists from NAWSA came to speak and organize in Nevada before the election.

On November 3, 1914, the voters approved women's suffrage for Nevada with 10,936 to 7,257 votes. This was the largest proportionate vote for women's suffrage at the time.

== After suffrage ==
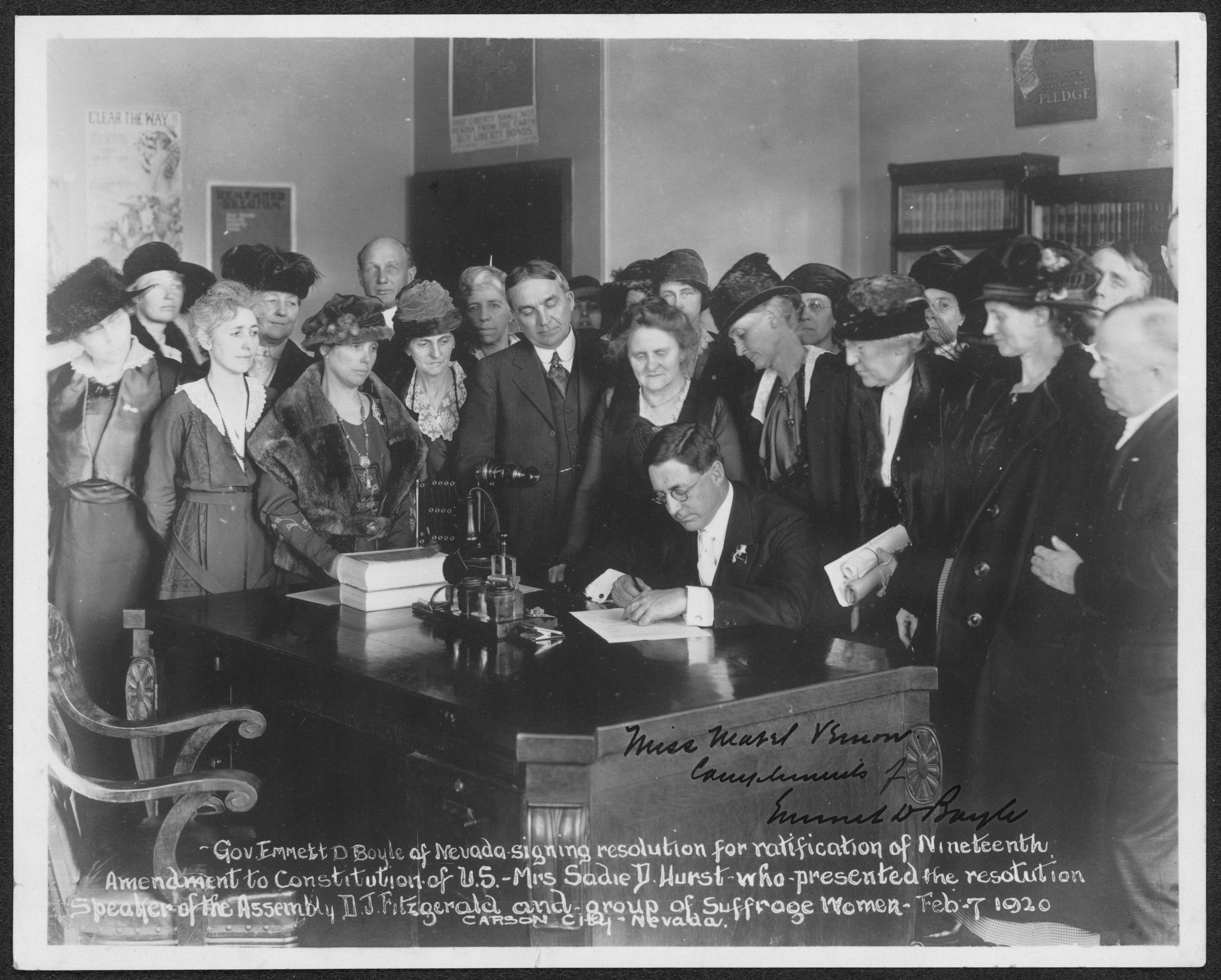
Governor Emmet D. Boyle signs the ratification for the 19th Amendment presented to him by Sadie Hurst on February 7, 1920.

After Nevada women gained the right to vote, they continued to organize. The Washoe County Equal Franchise Society voted to form the Woman Citizens' Club after women gained the right to vote in Nevada. NEFS dissolved and formed the Nevada Women's Civic League. Other suffragists went on to campaign outside Nevada for women's suffrage in other states. The plan was to raise a "veritable suffrage cyclone."

In 1916, women from the Congressional Union (CU) toured the United States with the Suffrage Special. The women of the CU wanted to recruit women who could already vote in their states to help them support efforts towards a national suffrage amendment. The Suffrage Special arrived in Reno on April 26, 1916. The next day, they stopped in Carson City where they were met by Governor Emmet D. Boyle and later had a car tour of the city. The women were not won over by the idea of a new group, especially because of the threat of World War I. Anne Henrietta Martin was involved in part of the Suffrage Special trip. Also in 1916, Nevada women voted in their first county and state elections.

In 1918, Reno suffragist, Sadie D. Hurst, was endorsed by the Woman Citizens' Club in her run for Nevada Assembly. Hurst became the first woman elected to the Assembly. On January 22, 1919, Hurst pressed for a resolution to the United States Congress to share that Nevada was in favor of a federal suffrage amendment on women's suffrage. Hurst's resolution passed easily and was presented to Congress. In November 1919, a women voters conference was held in Reno with Carrie Chapman Catt speaking. The Nevada League of Women Voters was formed on the last day of the convention.

A special session of the Nevada Legislature was convened to consider the Nineteenth Amendment on February 7, 1920. Hurst introduced the resolution to ratify the amendment in the Assembly. At the same time, the Senate had already passed a resolution in favor of ratification. At this point, the resolution was reported out for final passage. Hurst again presided, and gave a speech, thanking the men of Nevada for their support of the women in the state. The resolution passed with only one dissenting vote. Nevada was the 28th state to ratify the Nineteenth Amendment.

== Anti-suffrage in Nevada ==
Anna Fitch, wife of Congressman Thomas Fitch, wrote an open letter that was published on the front page of the Territorial Enterprise in 1869. Fitch believed that giving women the vote would harm women because it would take away their feminine qualities to become involved in politics.

In November, the Nevada Association of Women Opposed to Equal Suffrage (NAWOWS) was formed in Reno in 1914. The president was Emma Adams. Also in 1914, as the referendum for women's suffrage came up for the vote, Republican and investor George Wingfield announced he would leave Nevada if the referendum passed. While Wingfield was wealthy and influential, he was also hated because he had helped break up the Goldfield Labor Union in 1907. Wingfield's political pressure did have an effect on politicians and institutions alike. Democrats became pro-suffrage in the state in order to counter Wingfield. Other politicians developed what was termed "Wingfield cold feet" when they were hesitant to support suffrage.

== See also ==
- List of Nevada suffragists
- Timeline of women's suffrage in Nevada
- Women's suffrage in states of the United States
- Women's suffrage in the United States
