= Timeline of women's suffrage in Nevada =

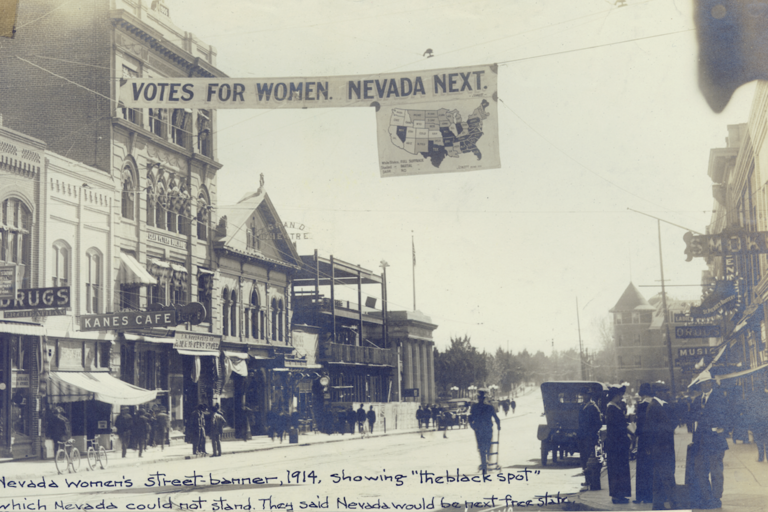
"Votes for Women. Nevada Next" c. 1914

This is a timeline of women's suffrage in Nevada. In 1869, Curtis J. Hillyer introduced a women's suffrage resolution in the Nevada Legislature which passed, though it would wait for another legislative session to approve a second time. The first women's suffrage convention took place in 1870 in Battle Mountain Station. Several women's suffrage resolutions are voted on, or approved, but none complete the criteria to become amendments to the Constitution of Nevada. In the 1880s, women gain the right to run for school offices and several women run and win. Some Nevada women's suffrage groups work throughout the 1890s and hold more conventions. However, most suffrage work slows down or stops around 1899. The Nevada Equal Franchise Society (NEFS) was created in 1911. That same year, Attorney Felice Cohn writes a women's suffrage resolution that is accepted and passed by the Nevada Legislature. Anne Henrietta Martin becomes president of NEFS in 1912. The next year, Cohn's resolution passes a second time and will go out as a voter referendum the next year. On November 3, 1914 Nevada voters approve women's suffrage. Women in Nevada continue to be involved in suffrage campaigning. On February 7, 1920 Nevada ratifies the Nineteenth Amendment.

== 19th century ==
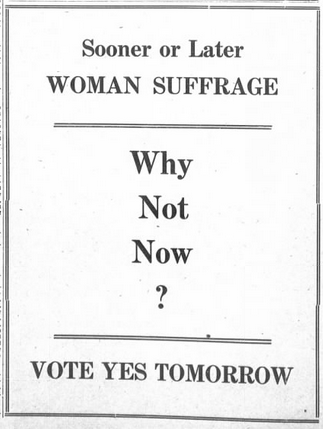
Women's suffrage ad in the Daily Independent of Elko, Nevada, November 2, 1914

=== 1860s ===
1869

- Curtis J. Hillyer introduces an equal suffrage bill in the Nevada Legislature. The bill passes to amend the state constitution, but it needs to pass a second vote in two years.

=== 1870s ===
1870

- July 4: First women's suffrage convention in Nevada is held in Battle Mountain Station.

1871

- The equal suffrage amendment introduced by Hillyer doesn't pass the required second vote.

1873

- Another equal suffrage resolution is unsuccessfully proposed by Assemblyman Oscar Grey.

=== 1880s ===
1881

- A joint legislative committee in the Nevada Legislature recommends amending the state constitution in favor of women's suffrage, but it fails to gain support.

1883

- Hannah K. Clapp leads the fight to see the Nevada Senate pass a women's suffrage bill, but the bill does not pass the Assembly.

1885

- A women's suffrage resolution passes in the Nevada Legislature and waits to be approved again in two years.

1887

- The women's suffrage resolution fails to pass. However, a resolution for women to run for school offices is passed and waits to be approved again in two years.

1889

- The School office resolution passes and women may run.

=== 1890s ===
1890

- Several women are elected to school trustee positions and two women, Susan Miller and Josephine Taylor are elected as school superintendents.

1894

- November 30: The Lucy Stone Non-Partisan Equal Suffrage League is formed in Austin, Nevada.

1895

- February: An equal suffrage bill passes the Nevada Legislature and waits to be approved a second time in two years.
- May 17: Susan B. Anthony and Anna Howard Shaw stop in Nevada on their way to California.
- October 29–30: State suffrage convention held in Reno. The State Equal Suffrage Association is formed.

1896

- September 24: Second state suffrage convention is held in Reno.

1897

- The equal suffrage bill does not pass a second time.
- October 30: Third state suffrage convention is held in Carson City.

1898

- Women's suffrage petitions are sent throughout Nevada.

1899

- The fourth state suffrage convention is held.
- The State Suffrage Association ceases to function.

== 20th century ==
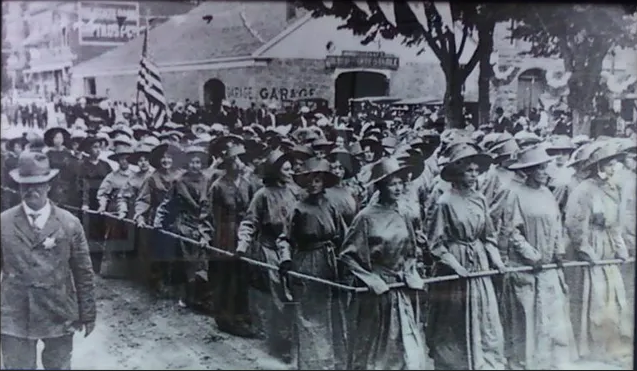
Nevada suffragists marching

=== 1900s ===
1907

- Women are declared to be unable to serve as Deputy State Superintendents of Public Instructions by the Attorney General.
- County school superintendents are abolished.

1909

- The Nevada Legislature approved a resolution to allow women to be elected or appointed school superintendents and notaries public.

=== 1910s ===
1911

- February 4 : The Nevada Equal Franchise Society (NEFS) is organized.
- Attorney Felice Cohn writes a bill for women's suffrage that passes the Nevada Legislature.
- The 1909 school superintendent and notary bill is passed a second time, now it will go out as a voter referendum.
- Cohn creates the Non-Militant Suffrage Association.

1912

- Anne Henrietta Martin becomes president of NEFS.
- During the 1912 election, suffragists position themselves at the polls and remind voters to vote for candidates who endorse women's suffrage.
- The voters approve the school superintendent and notary amendment.
- NEFS canvasses to find out which politicians support women's suffrage and then campaign for them.

1913

- The 1911 women's suffrage resolution written by Cohn passes a second time and will go out as a referendum.
- October 30: The Nevada Federation of Women's Clubs (NFWC) officially endorses women's suffrage.

1914

- A Nevada Men's League is created with help from James Lees Laidlaw.
- November: The Nevada Association of Women Opposed to Equal Suffrage (NAWOWS) is formed in Reno.
- November 3: Cohn's suffrage amendment wins with a vote of 10,936 to 7,257.
- The Washoe County Equal Franchise Society dissolves and forms the Woman Citizens' Club.

1915

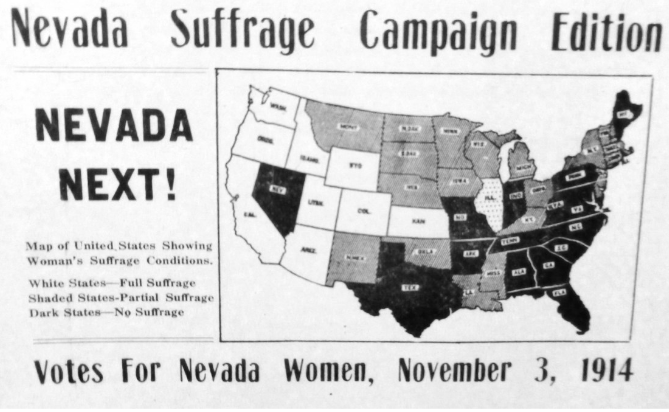
Nevada Next! Votes for Nevada Women, November 3, 1914

- February: At the state suffrage convention in Reno, NEFS is dissolved and the Nevada Woman's Civic League is formed.

1916

- April 26: The Suffrage Special stops in Reno.
- April 27: Suffrage Special delegates meet with Governor Emmet D. Boyle in Carson City and attempt to interest women in a new women's party.
- Martin accompanies the Suffrage Special for part of its journey.
- Nevada women are able to vote for the first time in county and state elections.

1918

- August: The Woman Citizens' Club endorses suffragist Sadie D. Hurst for Nevada Assembly.
- November: Hurst wins and becomes the first woman to hold office in the Assembly.

1919

- January: Hurst proposes a resolution to the United States Congress that would show Nevada's support for a federal suffrage amendment. It passes.
- November: A conference is held in Reno with Carrie Chapman Catt speaking. The Nevada League of Women Voters is formed on the last day of the convention.

=== 1920s ===
1920

- February 7: A special session is called in the Nevada Legislature to speedily ratify the Nineteenth Amendment. Hurst presides over the proceedings and it is passed.

1924

- The Indian Citizenship Act is passed giving Native American women greater voting rights.

=== 1930s ===
1939

- March: A bill sponsored by Luella Kirkbride Drumm to eliminate the state requirement that married women in Nevada “use the designation ‘Mrs.’” when “[registering] to vote under their own first names" is approved by the Nevada Assembly.

== See also ==
- List of Nevada suffragists
- Women's suffrage in Nevada
- Women's suffrage in states of the United States
- Women's suffrage in the United States
