= Delphine Anderson Squires =

Journalist and suffragist

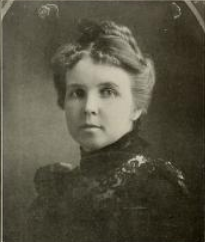
- Delphine Anderson Squires in 1912
- Born: January 8, 1868; Portage City, Wisconsin
- Died: November 21, 1961 (aged 93); Las Vegas
- Occupation(s): Journalist, suffragist
- Known for: Women's suffrage in Nevada
- Spouse: Charles Pember Squires

Delphine Anderson Squires (January 8, 1868 – November 21, 1961) was a journalist, suffragist, and women's advocate in Nevada. She both participated in and founded numerous women's clubs, including the Mesquite Club, a civic service organization still active in Las Vegas today.

== Early life ==
Delphine Anderson was born on January 8, 1968, in Portage City, Wisconsin. Her original career plan was to become a music teacher and she was awarded a contract with Seattle Public Schools; after the Great Seattle Fire of 1889, she reconsidered, moving to Redlands, California with her newly married husband Charles Pember Squires. In 1905, they relocated to Las Vegas.

== Career and advocacy ==
Squires wrote for the Las Vegas Age, the first newspaper in Las Vegas, published by her husband Charles. She used her platform as a writer to "forge a path of liberation" for women's voting rights. She also joined multiple women's rights organizations. In 1907, she established a branch of the Congress of Mothers (a forerunner of the National Parent Teacher Association). In 1911, Squires co-founded the Mesquite Club, which was formed to "cover a broad area of endeavors of social, civic, and philanthropic importance". She also served as the club's second president, from 1912 to 1914.

In 1914, Squires served as the Nevada state representative for the General Federation of Women's Clubs, attending the Twelfth Biennial Convention held in Chicago. She also spoke at a suffrage meeting held in New York City sponsored by the Equal Suffrage League and the New York Woman Suffrage Party. In the same year, Squires was elected to serve as the vice-president of the Nevada Equal Franchise Society. In 1915, she was elected as president of the Nevada Federation of Women's Clubs. She was noted for her presidential address where she cited the 2 million members of the federation "with its influence and an ability to vote, how women could begin to change society".

Squires was a founding member of the Las Vegas Library and served as chair of the board for several years.

== Death and legacy ==
Squires died at her home in Las Vegas on November 21, 1961.

Squires is remembered for following a 'diplomatic approach' to securing a woman's right to vote, departing from the more radical ways of activists Anne Martin and Bird Wilson. Despite this difference, her accomplishments were considered "integral" in bringing women's suffrage to Nevada. The efforts of Squires and the Mesquite Club in fighting for the Nineteenth Amendment is commemorated by a historical marker in downtown Las Vegas. She is also remembered for both her philanthropic lifestyle as well as her neighborliness, and was considered a "trailblazer" for hospitality in early Las Vegas.

== See also ==
- List of suffragists and suffragettes
- Women's suffrage in Nevada
