= Luella Kirkbride Drumm =

American politician

- Born: Mary Luella Kirkbride; June 17, 1872; Vermont, Illinois
- Died: February 11, 1962 (aged 89); Sparks, Nevada
- Occupation: The only female member of the Nevada Assembly in 1939
- Spouse(s): Andrew Dellard Drumm, Sr.
- Parent(s): Andrew Briner Kirkbride and Ellen Alice Randolph

Luella Kirkbride Drumm (June 17, 1872 – February 11, 1962) was a 20th-century American politician and Democrat who was elected to the Nevada State Legislature in 1939. The representative for Churchill County, she was the only woman to serve in the Nevada Assembly that year. During her tenure, she chaired the Agriculture, Engrossment, Federal Relations, and Fish and Game committees, and advocated for legislation that improved the rights of women.

One of her first accomplishments was to successfully sponsor a bill which eliminated the state requirement that married women in Nevada “use the designation ‘Mrs.’” when “[registering] to vote under their own first names.”

== Formative years and family ==
Born in Vermont, Illinois, on June 17, 1872, Luella Kirkbride Drumm was a daughter of Andrew Briner Kirkbride (1833—1877) and Ellen Alice Randolph. On April 3, 1895, she wed Andrew Dellard Drumm (1872—1939) in Wilmington, Nebraska. They had three children: Andrew D. Drumm, Jr., Gertrude Drumm, who later wed David H. Smith, and Marguerite Drumm. After initially settling in Colorado where her husband was employed as an irrigation specialist, they subsequently relocated to Santa Cruz, California, and then to Goldfield, Nevada, before making their final move in 1906 to a farm in Fallon, Nevada, where her husband established a thriving business in contracting. She was married to Andrew Drumm, Sr. for more than four decades, until his death on March 2, 1939.

== Political career and other civic activities ==
Initially elected to the Nevada State Legislature as a Democrat in 1939, she represented Churchill County. The only woman to serve in the Nevada Assembly that year, she successfully sponsored a bill that eliminated the state requirement that married women in Nevada “use the designation ‘Mrs.’” when “[registering] to vote under their own first names.” In July 1940, she announced that she would run for reelection, but she was ultimately defeated by her male Republican opponent. During her tenure, she chaired the Agriculture, Engrossment, Federal Relations, and Fish and Game committees. In the late 1940s, she was appointed by Governor Vail Pittman to serve as a delegate to a United Nations conference in San Francisco, California.

In addition, she was an active member of the following civic and social organizations:

- Artemisia Club
- Federation of Women’s Clubs
- Daughters of the American Revolution
- VFW Auxiliary

Preceded in death by her husband in 1939, she continued to reside in Fallon into the 1950s.

== Death and interment ==
During her final years, Luella Drumm was a resident of the Good Luck Nursing Home in Sparks, Nevada. She died there on February 11, 1962 at the age of 89. Following funeral services and cremation, she was interred at the Churchill County Cemetery in Fallon.

== See also ==
- Timeline of women's suffrage in Nevada
- Women's suffrage in Nevada
