= California Equal Suffrage Association =

US political organization

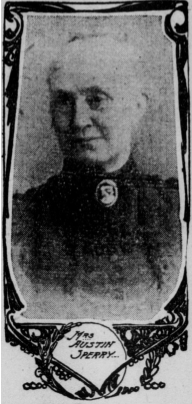
Mary Simpson Sperry

The California Equal Suffrage Association (CESA) was a political organization in the state of California with the intended goal of passing women's suffrage.

== Founding ==
In 1870 the California State Woman Suffrage Society or California Woman Suffrage Association was founded by Laura de Force Gordon. The California Woman Suffrage Association changed its name from California Woman Suffrage Association to California Equal Suffrage Association in 1896 to appeal to male sympathisers.

The California Equal Suffrage Association (CESA) was headquartered in northern California and was founded by suffragist Elizabeth Lowe Watson. It was incorporated in 1904. The original name of the organization was The California Woman's Suffrage Association. Part of the reason for rebranding the organization was to reach out to men for support of the suffrage cause. The CESA would actively seek out the support of men. Activists affiliated with this organization lobbied for women's suffrage from automobiles and produced goods for purchase such as playing cards and postcards.

== Political work ==
Suffragist Gail Laughlin traveled the state in November 1904 campaigning on behalf of suffrage and spreading the word about this organization. Historian Gayle Gullett noted that the Los Angeles Times referred to the attendees as "several hundred assertive-appearing women." In 1905 the organization distributed pamphlets promoting the suffrage cause in the California Senate chamber. In September of that year they held their state convention. Attendees included Caroline Severance, Mary Sperry, Anna Bidwell and Ellen Clark Sargent.

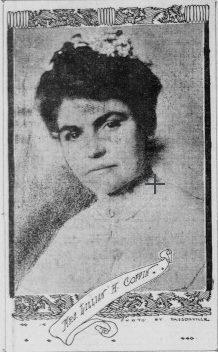
Lillian Harris Coffin

Caroline Severance was designated an honorary president of this organization in 1905. Suffragist Lillian Harris Coffin created a central committee for the CESA in 1906. Berkeley attorney Mary McHenry Keith also served as president of the CESA.

== Prominent members ==
- Lillian Harris Coffin
- Mary Gamage
- Minora Kibbe
- Gail Laughlin
- Alice Park
- Ellen Clark Sargent
- Caroline Severance

=== Presidents of the CESA ===
- Mary Sperry President of the CESA in 1900-1907
- Elizabeth Lowe Watson, President of the CESA in 1910-1912
- Mary McHenry Keith, President of the CESA in 1912-1920

== See also ==
- Minnie Sharkey Abrams
