= Bishop Whitaker's School for Girls =

Coordinates: 39.5329°N 119.8241°W

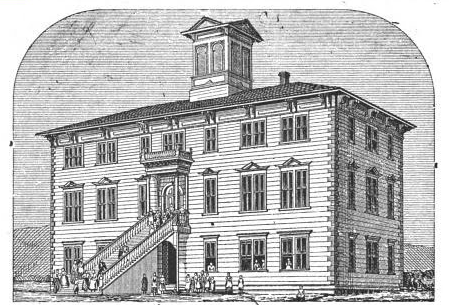

Information
- Established: 1876
- Founder: Ozi William Whitaker
- Closed: 1894
- Gender: Girls

Bishop Whitaker's School for Girls was a secondary school (taking both day and boarding students) sited on a hill overlooking the Truckee River in Reno, Nevada. Founded by Episcopal bishop Ozi William Whitaker, it operated from 1876 to 1894.

== Creation ==
The school was founded with an initial offer in 1875 of $10,000 by New York socialite, heiress and philanthropist Catharine Lorillard Wolfe, on the condition that Bishop Whitaker find matching funds elsewhere. By mid-1876, funds had been raised and a half-block of land had been donated by the Central Pacific Railroad. The school opened October 12, 1876, on a site on the edge of town ("the walk from the depot to the school was nearly half the way through sagebrush, and north and west was an unbroken waste of sage as far as the eye could see") with fifty pupils and five teachers under the leadership of principal Kate A. Sill.

== Operation ==
By 1879, the school was housed in a building of three stories which included a gymnasium, classrooms, music rooms, and space for 40 boarders on the third floor. Academic classwork was offered through the twelfth grade, including art, music, foreign languages, and domestic science.

In 1886 Bishop Whitaker moved to Pennsylvania. On March 31, 1886, the University of Nevada moved from Elko to a site near Whitaker's. While the University required a basic entrance exam, students from Nevada high schools were not required to take that exam; and the University did not charge tuition. (The tuition at Whitaker's ran as high as $65 per month.)

== Shutdown and legacy ==
In 1894, Whitaker's School shut down. The old building was leased to the university and used as a dormitory until the 1896 completion of Lincoln Hall. The Washoe County School District used parts of the building to house various classes during periods of construction. The building was converted into a hospital; later, the City of Reno purchased it. The old building finally was demolished; there is now a park called Whitaker Park, where the school once stood.

Its best-known alumna was suffragist and historian Anne Henrietta Martin, the first woman to run for the United States Senate.
