= Mary McHenry Keith =

American lawyer (1855–1947)

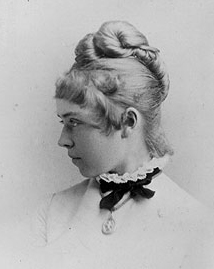
- Born: Mary McHenry; November 20, 1855; San Francisco, California, US
- Died: October 13, 1947 (aged 91); Berkeley, California, US
- Education: University of California, Hastings Law School
- Occupations: Lawyer, Activist, Suffragist
- Known for: first woman graduate of the Hastings School of the Law
- Spouse: William Keith (m. 1883; died in 1911)

Mary McHenry Keith (1855–1947) was an American lawyer and social justice advocate who was especially known for her work in the woman suffrage and animal rights movements. As the widow of the artist William Keith, she also was celebrated for her work cataloguing, preserving, and sharing his collected works.

== Early life ==
Mary McHenry was born in San Francisco, California on November 20, 1855, to John McHenry and Ellen Josephine Metcalfe McHenry. John McHenry was a Judge and Louisiana Supreme Court Justice who moved to California in 1850 and continued to work as a judge in San Francisco. Mary had three siblings.

Mary McHenry attended San Francisco's Girl's High School before pursuing a college degree. Mary's father was not supportive of women's work outside the home, but did not interfere with her attending college. McHenry completed her Bachelor of Arts degree in 1879 at the University of California, Berkeley.

As of result of the activist work of Clara Shortridge Foltz and Laura de Force Gordon, the newly formed University of California College of the Law, San Francisco began admitting female students just as McHenry completed her undergraduate degree. Behind her father's back, Mary enrolled in law school, and in 1882 she became the first female graduate from Hastings. She worked for a short time as a lawyer, specializing in probate cases. Upon her marriage to prominent landscape artist William Keith in 1883, Mary stopped practicing law and focused her attention on activist causes, most especially women's and animal rights issues. William Keith died in 1911, and Mary did not remarry.

== Women's activism ==
=== Early efforts ===
As a college student, Mary McHenry is reported to have been part of the dress reform movement, drawing attention to the ways in which a woman's clothing restricted her abilities to comfortably and effectively engage in the full range of activities available to her male classmates. The issue of coeducation is one that Keith addressed as president of the Association of Collegiate Alumnae before turning to suffrage causes in 1891. Her desire to support women's full development and her belief that women had a duty to participate in society were foundational to her participation in women's activist organizations.

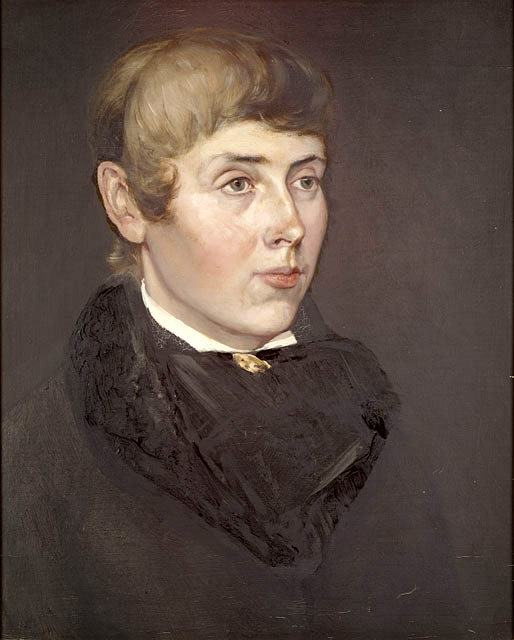
Portrait of Mary McHenry Keith painted by husband William Keith 1883

After marrying and giving up her law practice, Mary McHenry Keith was able to devote more time to activism including promoting woman suffrage and opposing white slavery and prostitution. By the early 1890s she was a prominent lecturer and member of the Berkeley Political Equality Club, serving as its President beginning in 1902. With a membership of over 200, the Berkeley Political Equality Club was one of the largest suffrage organizations in California and throughout the West Coast of the US.

=== Suffrage activism, 1895-1901 ===
Keith was an organizer of the 1895 meeting of the Woman's Congress, held in Berkeley, at which Californians strategized how to advocate for woman suffrage in the state and to connect their work to national suffrage efforts. Susan B. Anthony is reported to have visited with the Keiths at their home while attending the Congress. Soon afterward, Keith and Anthony began a regular correspondence about suffrage and other women's rights issues that would continue until Anthony's death in 1906.

Mary is reported to have first met Elizabeth Cady Stanton in 1871, but developed a friendship with Stanton when in 1895 Stanton and Anna Howard Shaw were visiting California's state suffrage convention in San Francisco and various other suffrage events in the state. As she did with Anthony, Keith engaged in regular correspondence with Stanton throughout the suffrage campaigns. The Keiths and their friends naturalist and artist John Muir, educator John Swett and his wife Mary Louise Swett, became a network of well-connected Californians with whom Stanton developed friendships during her visits to California, often staying with the Keiths in Berkeley. Mary Louise Swett promoted suffrage through her leadership roles in the Martinez Equal Suffrage Club, while Mary Keith gained prominence in Berkeley-based organizations.

Although the 1896 suffrage campaign in California was unsuccessful, Keith continued to work through the Berkeley Political Equality Club to recruit more suffrage supporters through lectures and lobbying of state politicians. In 1901 Carrie Chapman Catt, then President of the National American Suffrage Association, encouraged local organizations to expand their efforts, and this further motivated Keith to revive and expand the membership of the Berkeley Political Equality Club. Keith is credited with inspiring women to join women's organizations and social groups for personal and societal improvement, and helping to sway them to the cause of woman suffrage. As a component of this work, Keith intentionally sought the support of influential women and men who could lend their voices and finances to the cause. Correspondence between Keith and Susan B. Anthony in 1900 reflects Keith's efforts to recruit philanthropist Phoebe Apperson Hearst (then widow of George Hearst and mother of William Randolph Hearst) to the cause. Her work proved successful, as Hearst was a strong advocate for suffrage in advance of the 1911 state vote.

=== Suffrage activism, 1902-1910 ===
Keith supported suffrage for a variety of reasons including personal empowerment and social reform, identifying its value to the common good as well as the individual. Even so, recognizing some of the opposition to overly-independent women, Keith and other leaders in the suffrage movement primarily emphasized altruistic purposes over individual benefits when engaged in public speaking. On October 25, 1902, Keith presented an address at the California State Suffrage Association convention in San Francisco at which she revisited the issue of coeducation, indicating that coeducation was at risk if women did not have the vote. Concerns about coeducation and women's increasing enrollments in high schools and colleges were issues Keith discussed with both Elizabeth Cady Stanton and Susan B. Anthony, as prominent male university and government leaders were lamenting the impacts on men and society of women's expanded educational participation.

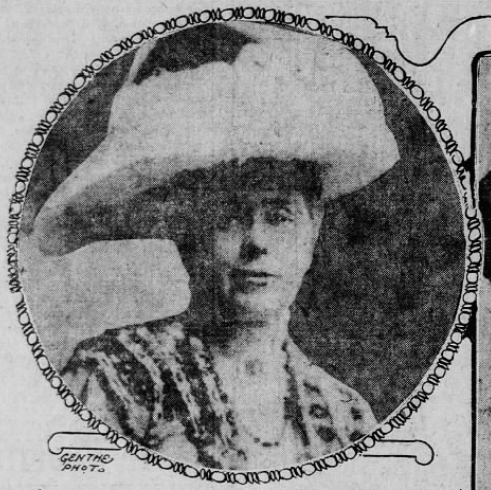
Mary McHenry Keith, 1910

In one of the few texts that specifically names Keith as supporting a particular political ideology, Johnson indicates that Keith “held socialist convictions, probably based on her strong sympathies for the underprivileged.” A 1902 Berkeley Gazette article on Keith provides a sense of the activist and woman:

"Mrs. Keith is a dainty little blue-eyed, rosy woman, whose gray hair is a good many years in advance of her face and still further ahead of her heart. Somehow she doesn't suggest suffrage in the least... You can't, when chatting with her in her artistic little parlor, imagine her presiding over a meeting of 'long-haired men and short-haired women'... The fact is, she is not at all fierce on the subject of her theories, but she has the knack for coaxing people over to her way of thinking. The most determined anti-suffrage women give in to her... her husband gives in to her."

In 1908 as the city of Berkeley was preparing to build its new City Hall, on behalf of the Berkeley Political Equality Club, Keith called for the city to place a letter in the building's cornerstone that drew attention to the disenfranchisement of women at the time of the building's establishment. The proposal was not supported, but the text of the letter was preserved and reads in part,

We ... hereby commit the cause of Equal Suffrage for man and woman to the judgment of future generations, in the confidence that in after years whoever shall read these lines will wonder that so late as the year 1908 the women of California were political serfs; they were taxed without representation, governed without their consent, and classed under the law with idiots, insane persons, criminals, minors and other defective classes ... We, about to die, greet you, the inheritors of a better age, men and women of the future Berkeley, equal before the law, enfranchised citizens; co-operating in all public service.

Keith's prominence as not only a local, but national, figure in the suffrage movement is demonstrated by her inclusion in the program of the 60th Anniversary Celebration of the Seneca Falls Convention, held October 15–21, 1908 in Buffalo, NY. In addition to some of the original convention attendees, the anniversary celebration included Mary Keith, Jane Addams, Alice Stone Blackwell, Harriet May Mills, Cary Thomas, Dorothy Dix, and Rev Antoinette Brown. Although she often got to speak to audiences who were supportive of woman suffrage, she was also concerned by the number of people, especially women, who remained uncommitted or indifferent to the cause and needed to be slowly and cautiously convinced of its necessity.

As a leader of the Berkeley Political Equality Club, Keith supported the organization by hosting the headquarters in her home. Keith was also an active member of, and financial contributor to, the prominent state and national suffrage organizations, including the National Equal Suffrage Association, National Women's Party, Club Women's Franchise League of California, the College Equal Suffrage League, the California Equal Suffrage Association (elected as second vice president in 1909), and the Berkeley Women's City Club. She promoted the cause of suffrage at these and other women's organizations within and outside the state. Keith may have contributed as much as $15,000 to local, state and national suffrage work.

=== The 1911 campaign and beyond ===
Keith was prominent in the 1911 California woman suffrage campaign. In the final year of the campaign, Keith rented a house to serve as the headquarters for the newly-formed Equal Suffrage League that coordinated efforts of suffrage clubs throughout the state. In addition to public speeches, Keith drew upon a variety of media to advocate for woman suffrage. On September 1, 1911, Keith and Mrs. Elizabeth Watson are reported as being the first women to use the new "wireless telephone" technology of radio to broadcast a pro-suffrage message to listeners up to 450 miles away from the National Wireless Telephone and Telegraph Company offices in San Francisco. Keith also had a weekly column in the Oakland Inquirer.

On October 10, 1911, voters in California again considered the issue of woman suffrage. While the state's major cities voted against suffrage, voters in smaller towns and more rural areas were more likely to support suffrage. Keith's Berkeley Political Equality Club is recognized as a strong force in the approval of California's 1911 vote for woman suffrage, because although Alameda County overall was anti-suffrage, Berkeley residents voted 2,417 to 1,761 in favor of fully enfranchising women in the state.

Although suffrage had already been achieved in California, in 1912 Keith was elected as president of the State Equal Suffrage Association in order to provide support to efforts in other states.

== Additional contributions ==
Keith was an advocate for animal rights, seeing them as sentient beings with souls. She saw connections between women's and animals rights, and her thoughts on animal rights are reported to have had a strong influence on John Muir. Her advocacy for animal rights led to her service to the Humane Society, the California Audubon Society, as an officer for the Society for the Prevention of Cruelty to Animals (SPCA) and as a trustee of the Latham Foundation for the Promotion of Humane Education.

Mary Keith was a donor to the Metropolitan Museum of Art. After William Keith's death in 1911, she helped to catalogue, preserve and exhibit his paintings.

== Resources ==
The Keith-McHenry-Pond Family Papers, 1841-1961 are located at the Bancroft Library, University of California, Berkeley. See also Brother Cornelius, Keith, Old Master of California, volumes 1 and 2.
