= William O'Hara Martin =

American politician

William O'Hara Martin (September 9, 1845 – September 14, 1901) was an American merchant and banker from Nevada who spent four years as a Republican member of the Nevada State Senate from Ormsby County (1877–1881) before moving to Reno.

He and wife Louise Stadtmuller Martin had seven children, of whom suffragist Anne Henrietta Martin was the second.
