= Elizabeth Lowe Watson =

American lecturer

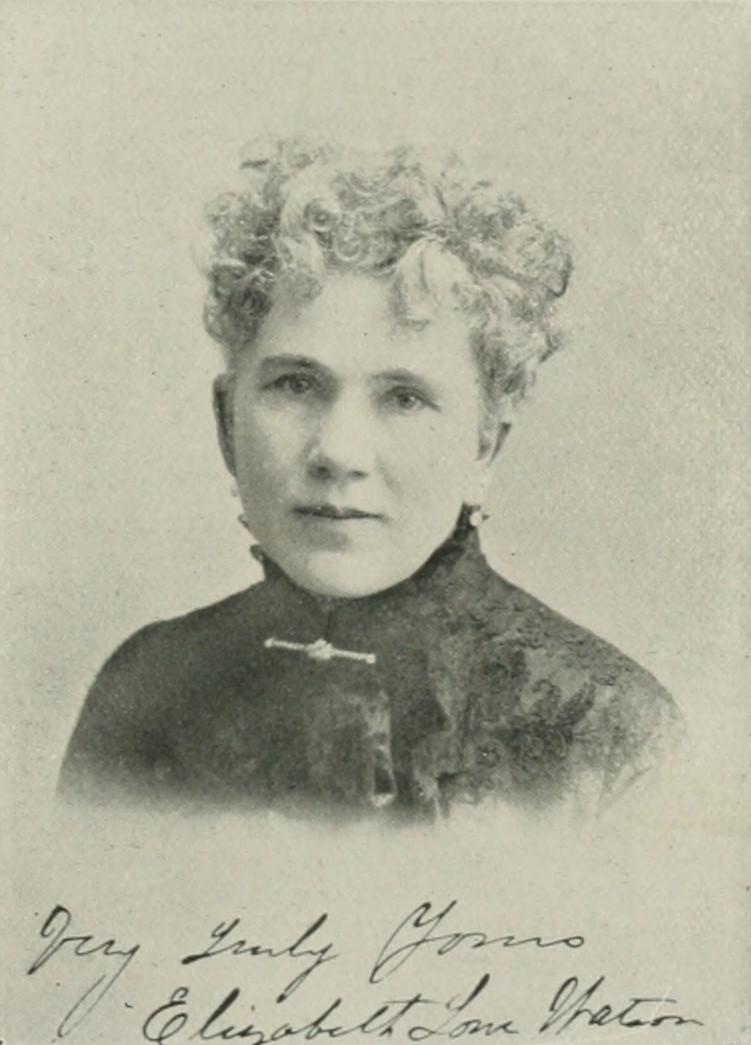
Elizabeth Lowe Watson, "A Woman of the Century"

Elizabeth Lowe Watson (October 6, 1842 – October 7, 1927) was an American lecturer on moral, social, religious reforms, and advancement of women. She served as president of the California Equal Suffrage Association and directed the work which won the ballot for women of the state. She was also active in the cause of temperance and peace work. Watson owned and managed a fruit farm in Cupertino, California.

== Biography ==
Elizabeth Low was born in Solon, Ohio, October 6, 1842. Her maiden name was Low, which was changed to Lowe by the younger members of the family. Her parents were Abraham and Lucretia (Daniels) Low. Her father was of Teutonic descent, born in New York City, and her grandfather, of the Knickerbocker type, had large landed possessions in "Old Manhattan Town." Her mother was of Scotch ancestry. Her grandmother, Mary Daniels, was an intelligent woman, with a poetic, religious temperament. Watson was the ninth child in a family of thirteen.

Her parents soon moved to Leon, New York where Elizabeth received a common school education and early became an inspirational speaker on liberal religious lines, anti-slavery, temperance, peace, and women's rights.

At fourteen, her public ministry began, attracting great crowds of people to hear her discussion upon religion and social ethics. She then, as in later years, often answered all kinds of questions from the audiences, and usually the subject of her lecture was chosen by a committee.

In 1861, she married Jonathan Watson, one of the oil barons of Titusville, Pennsylvania. They established a home in Rochester, New York, which soon became a center of intellectual, spiritual, and reform activities. In addition to caring for his five step-children, Watson had four children of her own. Two of them died young of diphtheria The eldest, Will Watson, died at age 25. Only a daughter, Lucretia, survived.

For some years after her marriage, she discontinued her public work, except to officiate at funerals. Her lectures in Chicago and other Eastern areas were successful. Her work was principally devoted to spirituality, as well as moral, social and religious reform, including the advancement of woman.

=== California ===
In 1878, after some financial troubles, she left her husband and moved to California, making a country home at the "Sunny Brae" fruit farm in what is now Cupertino, Santa Clara County, California. It brought an annual income of between US$4,000-US$5,000. Mrs. Watson superintended the business.

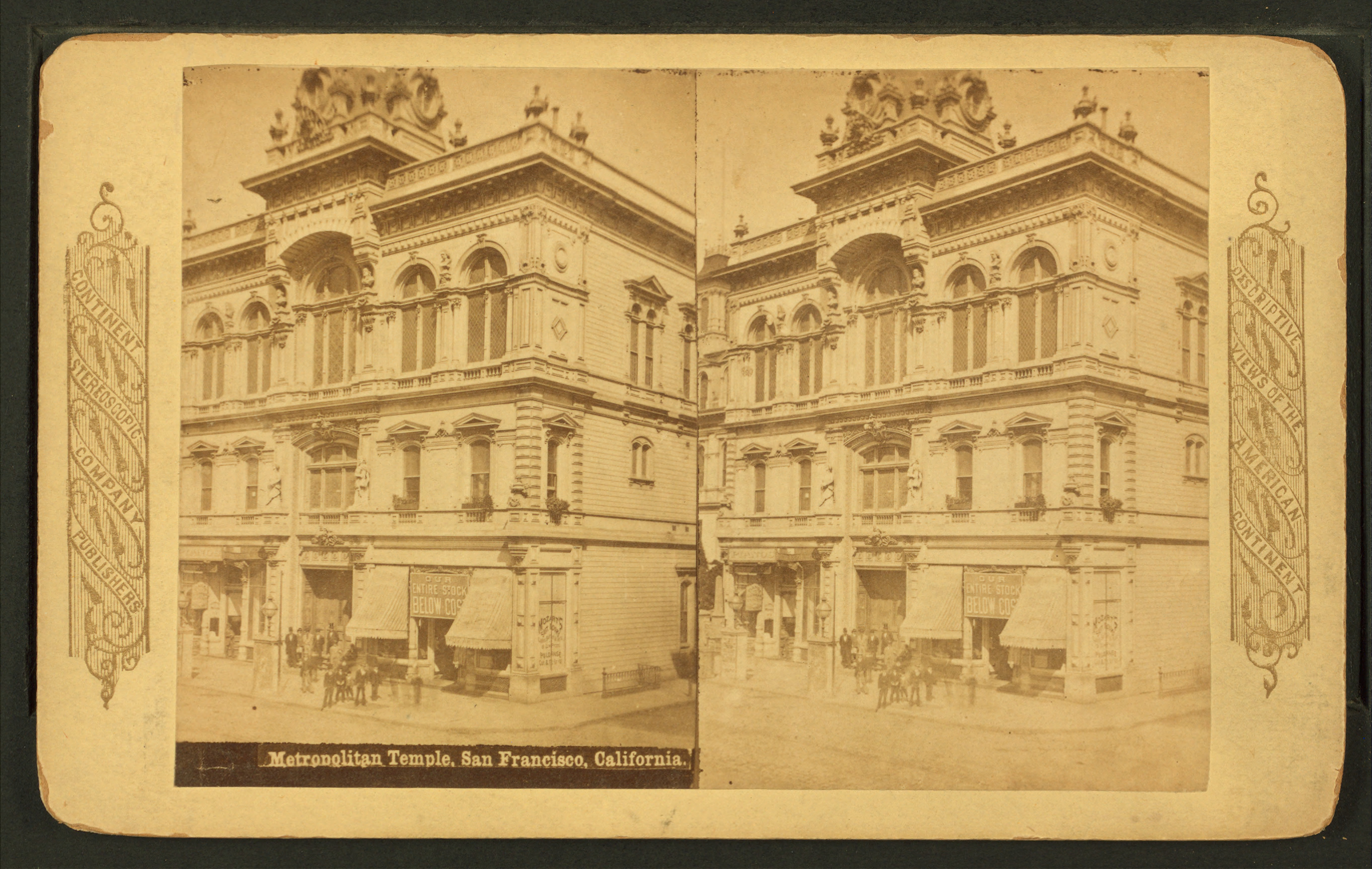
Metropolitan Temple, San Francisco

In 1882, she filled a four months' lecture engagement in Australia. Mr. Watson died in 1892. From the 1890s, for seven or eight years, she lectured nearly every Sunday in San Francisco at the Metropolitan Temple, out of which grew the Religio Philosophical Society, with Watson as it pastor. The Temple had a seating capacity of 1,500 and was often filled to the doors with an audience composed of people of all denominations.

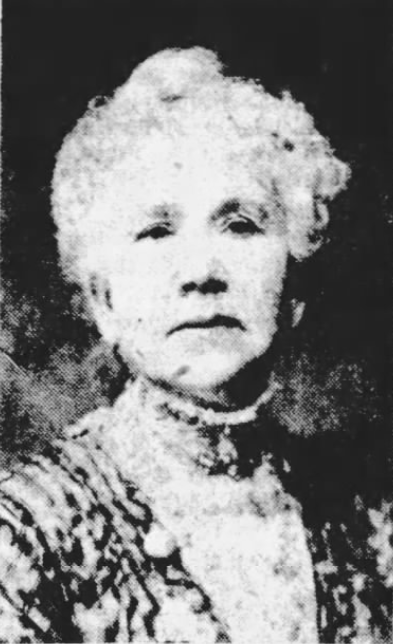
Elizabeth Lowe Watson, 1911

Though in later years, Watson removed to Saratoga, California, she continued to own Sunny Brae where, for the last 30 years of her life, she conducted religious services on the last Sunday of each June. She also established a lending library, the "Sunny Brae Free Library".

For more than 30 years, Watson was a life member of the American Peace Society. In 1906, she published Song and sermons, which included some of her poems and sermons. She served as President of the California Equal Suffrage Association in 1910–1912, directing the work which won the ballot for women of the state.

She died in Santa Clara County, October 7, 1927, after an illness of two months, survived by two brothers, Eugene and Alvin.
