= Minora Kibbe =

Minora Ellis Kibbe
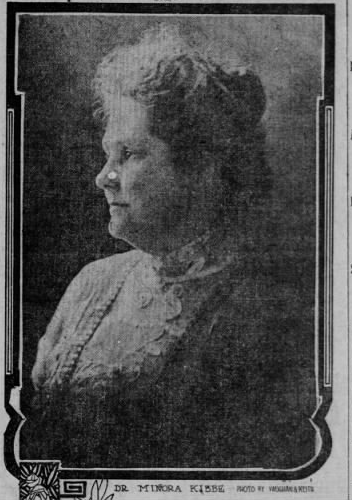
- Known for: Social Reform, Suffragist, Candidate for California Assembly

Minora Ellis Kibbe (née Minora Ellis) was a social reformer and suffragist from California. She ran for a seat on the San Francisco area school board in 1908, and for California's 36th State Assembly district in 1918.

== Education ==
Kibbe studied medicine for many years, eventually completing a doctor of medicine degree at Johns Hopkins University.

== Candidacy for office ==
Kibbe ran for a seat in the California Assembly in 1918. This part of an organized effort by women's rights activists in California to have a woman run for a seat in the Assembly from every district throughout the state.

== Medical career ==
Kibbe was a practising physician.

== Political activism ==
Kibbe was a noted California suffragist who frequently lectured on the topic of women's suffrage. In 1904 Kibbe served as the president of the Forty-First District Political Equality Club. She also served on the executive board of the California Equal Suffrage Association. Kibbe attended a number of gatherings where she heard Susan B. Anthony speak including one in San Francisco in 1905. At that gathering she organized with numerous other suffragists including Mary Sperry. In August 1911 she gave a talk in Oakland about the suffrage amendment on the California ballot that year. California suffragist Selina Solomons praised her activism in her book "How We Won the Vote in California."

== Personal life ==
Kibbe was born in Unionville, Nevada. She was married to George Kibbe, and had a son named George Ellis Kibbe. She lived in Oakland.

== See also ==
- List of California suffragists
- National American Women's Suffrage Association
- Women's suffrage in California
