= Mary Simpson Sperry =

American women's rights activist (1833–1921)

Mary Elizabeth Simpson Sperry (died April 1921), was a leading California suffragist. She served as president of the California Woman Suffrage Association from 1900 to 1907.

== Suffrage work ==
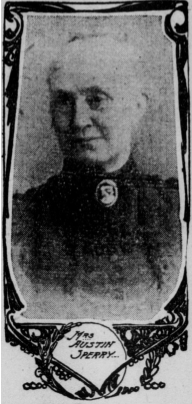
Mary Sperry in the San Francisco Call, November 1903

Mary Sperry was one of the leading suffragists in the state of California, specifically San Francisco, and was personally supported by noted suffragist Susan B. Anthony. Mary Sperry also worked alongside Carrie Chapman Catt and Anna Shaw. According to suffrage scholar Rebecca Mead, Anthony believed Sperry "links the old people to the new" and endorsed Sperry as leader of the California Woman Suffrage Association which as affiliated with the National American Woman Suffrage Association. Her work as treasurer was recognized in the History of Woman Suffrage published by Anthony and Elizabeth Cady Stanton. In volume VI of that publication it was noted that Sperry participated in a major suffrage conference in San Francisco in 1902.

Sperry also corresponded about the suffrage movement with philanthropist Phoebe Hearst. In a letter dated September 30, 1911, Sperry wrote to Hearst saying, ""I wish to acknowledge the pleasure it gave me at our recent Club meeting, when you told me that you favored 'Votes for Women.' Perhaps you do not realize how much it means to me, who have worked for it so long, to know that women like you are on our side."

== 1896 campaign for women's suffrage ==
Mary Sperry was actively involved in the failed 1896 campaign for women's suffrage in California. While serving as treasurer to the state suffrage association, for seven years, Sperry wrote opinion articles advocating for the passage of what was known as Amendment 6. Much of her work was organized from Market Street in San Francisco. National suffragist Anna Howard Shaw was quoted on this failed campaign as saying "it was not a Waterloo; it was Bunker Hill." The Susan B. Anthony Club was formed in Mary Sperry's home shortly after the campaign failed; she served as the club's president for many years.

== California Equal Suffrage Association ==
The California Equal Suffrage Association was incorporated in 1904. Sperry was involved in this organization from the beginning and worked with many other California suffragists including Gail Laughlin, Ellen C. Sargent, Alice L. Park and Minora Kibbe. In October 1907, Mary Sperry gave an address at the California Equal Suffrage Association's annual conference in Oakland; she explained that the suffrage movement was a "progressive movement, and must go on to equality". On October 3, 1908, Sperry was unanimously re-elected as the organization's president for a seventh year in a row.

== 1911 campaign in California ==
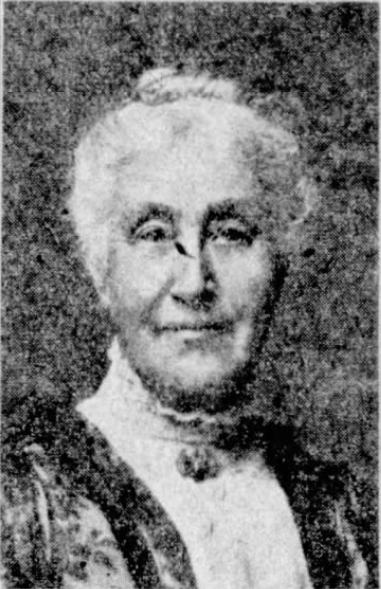
Mary Simpson Sperry

Sperry was politically active in the 1911 campaign for women's suffrage in California. That year she served as president of the Susan B. Anthony Club. In the early 1900s, Sperry served as president of the California Woman Suffrage Association where she organized hundreds of suffragists. In this organization, she worked alongside noted suffragists such as Gail Laughlin and Sperry's daughter Mary Austin Sperry. Sperry served as president of this organization from 1902 to 1909, succeeding Mary Wood Swift. The Stockton Record published Sperry's successful re-election in 1903. In 1905, Mary Sperry presided over a major suffrage convention on Sutter Street in San Francisco. Suffragist Minora Kibbe also attended this convention. She resigned on October 2, 1909 while attending a suffrage convention in Stockton, California.

Sperry personally saw women vote in Denver in 1908 and would share stories of these women voters with suffragists in California.

== Political activism ==
Sperry lobbied for suffrage through a variety of different organizations including the Century Club, the Susan B. Anthony Club and the California Club. Sperry's work in the California Club involved recruiting women into the cause of working for suffrage. She played a pivotal role in securing women's suffrage in the state of California and was photographed voting in the 1912 California election.

== Personal life ==
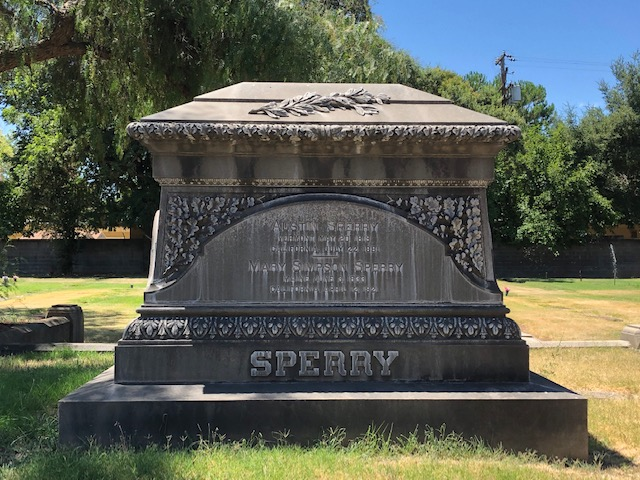
Gravesite of suffragist Mary Sperry

Mary Elizabeth Simpson was born in Brunswick, Maine on June 3, 1833. Mary Simpson Sperry moved to California after she married Austin Sperry, founder of the Sperry Flour Company, in 1862; together they had four children. Following her husband's death in 1881, she became the company's senior partner with Simpson Enterprises in 1884. The last 33 years of her life were spent in San Francisco. Her personal wealth helped fund the suffrage cause in California. The Sperry family were a prominent family in the city of Stockton, California. When her daughter Mary A. Sperry died, Mary Simpson Sperry contested her will as Dr. Sperry had lived for many years with suffragist Gail Laughlin.

Mary Sperry died April 1921.
