= Laura de Force Gordon =

American activist and lawyer

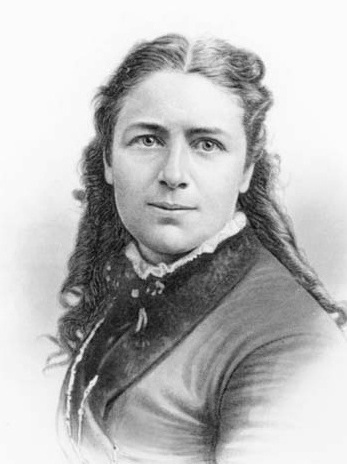
- Born: Laura de Force; August 17, 1838; North East, Pennsylvania, U.S.
- Died: April 5, 1907 (aged 68); Lodi, California, U.S.
- Occupations: Lawyer and women's-rights advocate
- Known for: Second female lawyer in California; first female publisher of a U.S. daily newspaper

Laura de Force Gordon (née Laura de Force; August 17, 1838 – April 5, 1907) was a California lawyer, newspaper publisher, and a prominent suffragette. She was the first woman to run a daily newspaper in the United States (the Stockton Daily Leader, 1874), and the second female lawyer admitted to practice in California.

As an activist, Gordon was a key proponent of the Woman Lawyer's Bill, which allowed women to practice law in California. She also pushed for the inclusion of a section in the California Constitution that prohibited the state from barring women from practicing any profession.

== Early life ==
Laura de Force Gordon (née Laura de Force) was born in North East, Pennsylvania, on August 17, 1838, to Abram de Force and Catherine Doolittle Allen. The family had nine children. Her father struggled with rheumatism, but the children (including at least two daughters) received education in the public schools.

After the death of one of the children, the family turned to Spiritualism in 1855. Gordon toured the Northeast of the United States giving public speeches, starting as young as 15, including a speech in Boston at age 18. During one such event, she met a Scottish physician named Charles H. Gordon, and married him in 1862. They moved west gradually, first to New Orleans (where he was posted during the Civil War), then to Nevada, and finally settling in California in 1870.

Before 1878, she divorced her husband on grounds of adultery. She later referred to herself frequently as a widow, rather than a divorcée, since widowhood was "a more acceptable explanation ... for ... lack of male protection".

== Journalism ==
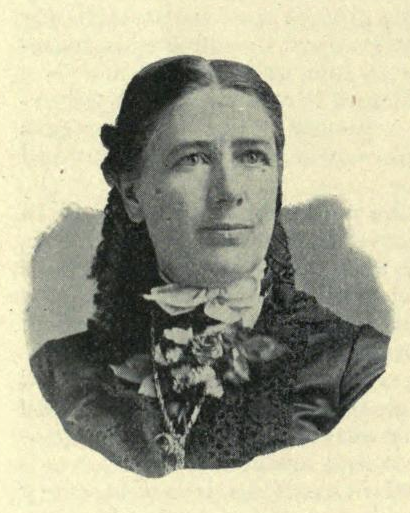
Portrait from the official publication of her speech at the Columbian Exposition in 1892.

In 1873, Gordon became an editor and reporter for the Stockton Narrow Gauge. In 1874, she bought the Stockton Weekly Leader and converted into a daily newspaper, (Note: The newspaper was renamed as the Stockton Daily Leader.) becoming the first female publisher of a paper in the United States. Between 1876 and 1878, she published the Oakland Daily Democrat. During that period, she also served as a correspondent for The Sacramento Bee and other papers, with a press desk on the floor of the state Assembly. She also served as an organizer of the Pacific Coast Press Association.

== Suffrage activism ==
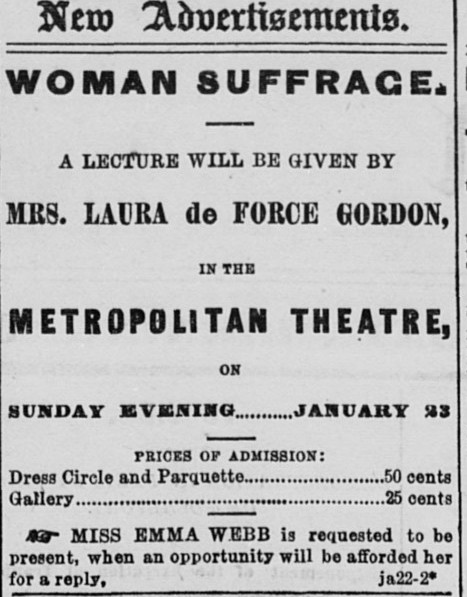
Advertisement in the San Francisco Daily Alta for a talk on suffrage given by Gordon in 1870.

In the late 1860s, Gordon's speaking career turned from Spiritualism to women's rights, perhaps influenced by Spiritualism's emphasis on egalitarianism and equality between the sexes. Gordon's February 19, 1868 speech in San Francisco, titled "The Elective Franchise: Who Shall Vote", was the first in California on the suffrage movement. It attracted a healthy crowd, some of whom went on to become leaders in California's suffrage movement.

In 1870, she helped found the California Women's Suffrage Society, and gave more than 100 speeches on suffrage. Gordon also worked for suffrage in Nevada, speaking throughout the state in the late 1860s and in front of the state legislature in 1871. One paper writing about her speaking at this time described her speaking as "like a stream of liquid fire".

Gordon also traveled outside of the Southwest, representing California at the 1872 National Woman Suffrage Association in New York City. At the 1872 Liberal Republican convention, alongside Susan B. Anthony, she asked the party to seat her as a representative from California (to "laughter") and submitted a pro-suffrage resolution.

After beginning her legal career in 1879, she continued her suffrage activism. She was elected president of the California State Suffrage Association from 1884–1894, and a paid speaker on behalf of the movement in the 1888 presidential election. In 1892, she spoke at the Columbian Exposition in Chicago.

Gordon was considered part of the "radical" branch of women's suffrage activists, in part because of her divorce and association with Spiritualism. Her correspondents included Henry George and Susan B. Anthony.

== Legal activism and career ==
As a result of her suffrage and publishing work, Gordon was well known in California political circles, and even received 200 votes for State Senate in 1871. This positioned her, along with fellow suffragette Clara Shortridge Foltz, to manage the lobbying campaign for the Woman Lawyer's Bill, which granted women the right to practice law in California in January 1878. Gordon used her position as a journalist covering the debate to stay in touch with lawmakers and lobby the governor for the final signature.

Later in 1878, Gordon was nominated as a delegate to the California Constitutional Convention, but was defeated. Despite not being elected as a delegate, during the convention, in February 1879, Gordon and Foltz successfully pushed for the inclusion of Article XX, Section 18, of the Constitution. This clause prohibited state law from barring women from entering any "lawful business, avocation, or profession".

At around the same time, in January 1879, Gordon and Foltz were briefly admitted to the recently opened Hastings College of the Law, and paid the $10 tuition. However, on the third day of classes, they were asked to leave, in part because the school's Dean felt their "rustling skirts" bothered the male students. In February, the women filed and argued a case that persuaded the state's Supreme Court to overturn that decision. (Note: The case was known as Foltz v. Hoge, et al., 54 Cal. 28 (1879).) However, because of work, activism, and family obligations, neither Gordon nor Foltz were able to graduate, and so the first female graduate of Hastings was Mary McHenry Keith.

At that time, law school graduation was not necessary for bar admission, so Gordon studied on her own. On December 6, 1879, she was admitted to the State Bar of California, becoming the second female attorney in the state (after Foltz). In 1880 she established her own firm in San Francisco, where she specialized in general and criminal law. Her work included successful defenses in several murder cases. She was also the first woman in California to argue a case to a jury. This work attracted national attention, particularly in the case of George Wheeler, where Gordon assisted the defense and Foltz the prosecution, leading New York's National Police Gazette to write that it was a case where "two females will be allowed to wag their tongues to their heart's content".

On February 3, 1883, Gordon became the second woman to be admitted to the bar of the United States Supreme Court, after Belva Lockwood.

== Later life and death ==
Gordon retired from the legal profession in 1901, and spent her last years on her farm in Lodi, California. Her health deteriorated in 1906 after the premature death of her grandchild. She caught pneumonia in March 1907, and died in Lodi on April 5, 1907.

== Modern speculation about sexual orientation ==
In May 1879, Gordon left a copy of her pamphlet The Great Geysers of California and How to Reach Them in a time capsule buried in San Francisco's Washington Square park. Gordon wrote inside the flyleaf:

If this little book should see the light after its 100 years of entombment, I would like its readers to know that the author was a lover of her own sex and devoted the best years of her life in striving for the political equality and social and moral elevation of women.

Gordon's inscription was read aloud in public after the time capsule was opened in April 1979. Armistead Maupin, who was present when the time capsule was opened, speculated that the quotation's use of "lover of her own sex" could have been a "coming out" for Gordon, but also acknowledged the phrase could have been an "idiosyncrasy of 19th century speech". The quotation was later used in Randy Shilts' biography of gay San Francisco politician Harvey Milk, "Mayor of Castro Street".

== See also ==
- List of first women lawyers and judges in California
