= Equal Franchise Society =

American women's suffrage organization

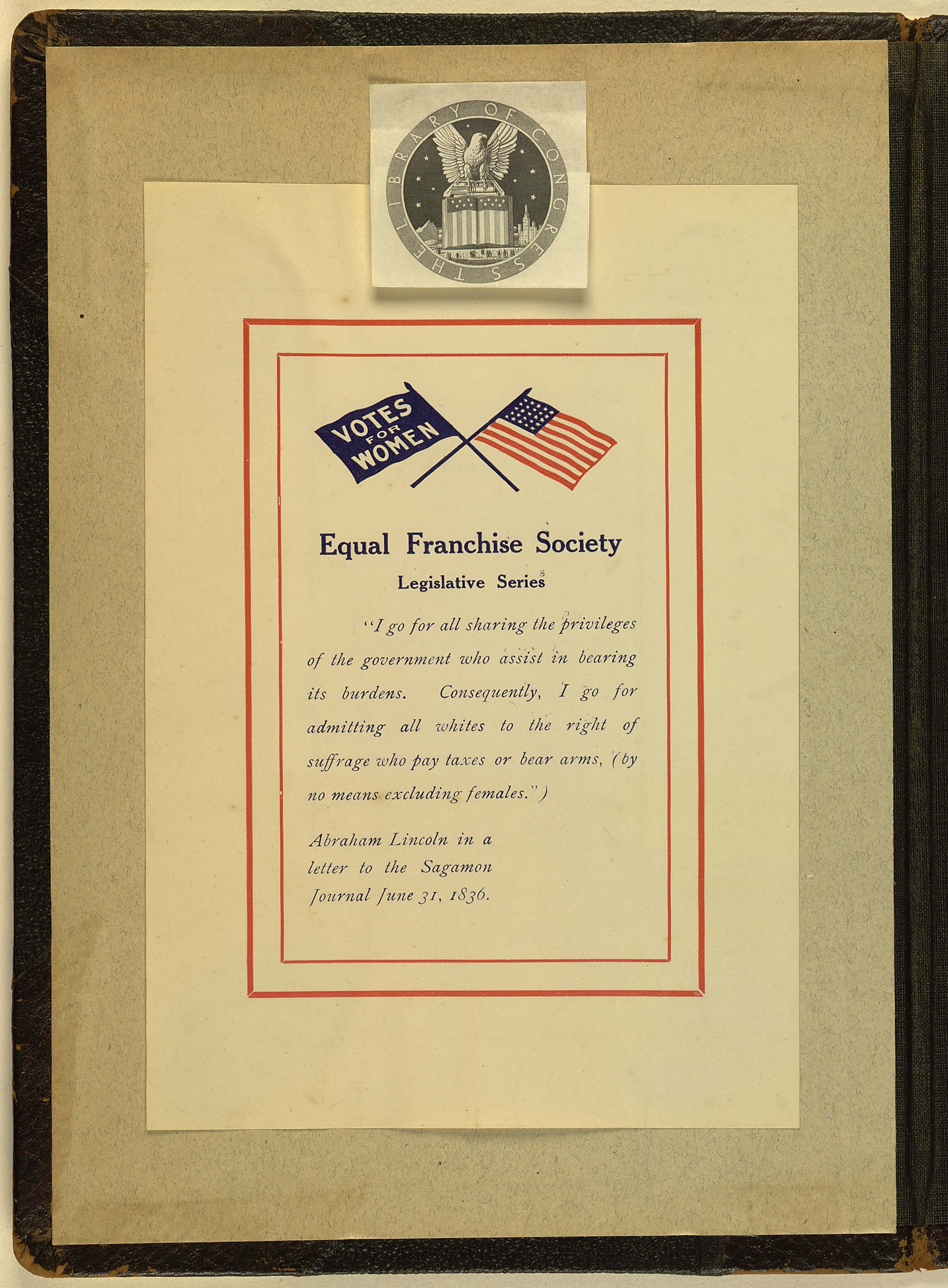
Equal Franchise Society Legislative Series

The Equal Franchise Society (EFS) was a state-by-state organization that advocated women's suffrage in the United States. Created and joined by women of wealth, it was a conduit through which the energies of upper-class women could be channeled into political activism conducted within a socially comfortable milieu. The New York branch of the Society, for example, often held suffrage rallies at which members spoke in the street outside the Colony Club, to which many of them belonged. After the public rally, Club members would eat luncheon inside their Club. The EFS also invited anti-suffragists to meet with them for the purposes of debate.

== History ==
Katherine Duer Mackay founded the Equal Franchise Society (EFS) in New York City in 1908 and also served as its president. The first meeting was held at her house on December 21, where the Constitution for the group was adopted and officers were elected. Mackey later leased offices for the group's meetings in the Madison Square Building. Mackay had a vision of the EFS uniting woman's suffrage groups into a "single body." Her vision of EFS also included the equality of men and women both in civic and political sectors and a prohibition against militant tactics. She also hoped that both wealthy and working-class women could work together towards suffrage through the EFS. The EFS decided in 1909 to push for the right to vote in the city of New York first, before they fought for the right to vote across the country.

Mackay quit as the president of EFS in 1911, stating that she did not have enough time to devote to the project.

The Nevada chapter of the EFS was formed by Jeanne Wier in 1910.

== See also ==
- Women's suffrage organizations and publications
- List of suffragists and suffragettes
- Timeline of women's suffrage
- Women's suffrage in the United States
