= Gail Laughlin =

American politician

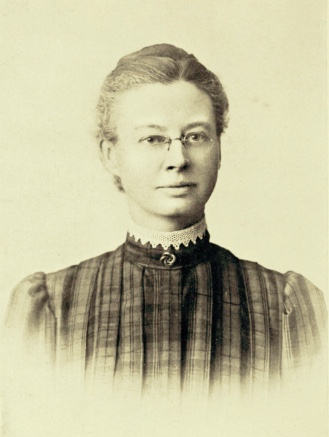
- Gail Laughlin, Representative Women of Colorado, 1914
- Born: May 7, 1868 Robbinston, Maine, United States
- Died: March 13, 1952 (aged 83) Portland, Maine, United States
- Occupation: Lawyer, suffragist
- Education: Wellesley College, Cornell Law School
- Partner: Dr. Mary A. Sperry

Abbie "Gail" Hill Laughlin (May 7, 1868 – March 13, 1952) was an American lawyer, suffragist, an expert for the United States Industrial Commission, and a member of the Maine State Senate. She was the first woman from Maine to practice law. She was the National Vice Chair of the women's suffrage movement and the President of the National Federation of Business and Professional Women's Clubs. She was posthumously inducted into the Maine Women's Hall of Fame in 1991.

== Early years ==
Gail Laughlin was born in Robbinston, Maine, to Robert Laughlin and Elizabeth (Stuart) Laughlin. She was one of nine children. Her mother was from St. Stephen, New Brunswick, and her father was from Belfast, Ireland. Her father died aged 56 in 1876, leaving her mother and six siblings behind, as two died in infancy. The family returned to Laughlin's mother's hometown of St. Stephen for financial support from extended family. In 1880, the family relocated to Portland, Maine, where Laughlin's eldest brother was working as a clerk. With the financial support of her brothers, Gail Laughlin was able to attend Portland High School.

== Education ==
Laughlin graduated from Portland High School in 1886 with honors. She received the Brown Medal award for earning the highest grades of all the girls in her graduating class. She was awarded a partial scholarship to Colby College, but could not afford to attend. She entered the workforce and began saving for Wellesley College, her dream school.

Laughlin's first job was working at a china imports office as a bookkeeper where she made four dollars a week. After saving enough money, she began to attend Wellesley College. There, she started and was president of the Agora Society that focused on expanding students knowledge on politics. Before graduation, she gave a speech to members of the Agora Society on the Wilson tariff bill that was published on the front cover of the American Economist by the Home Market Bulletin. She received fifty dollars for the publication that would go towards furthering her education. In 1894, Laughlin received a Bachelor of Arts degree from Wellesley. After her graduation, she was offered a job working as an editorial writer for the American Economist. This job allowed her to save money and pursue her dreams of working in law and politics.

After working at the American Economist for two years, Gail saved enough money to apply to Cornell Law School. During her interview with the school she was told that she would only be accepted if there were open seats that men could not occupy. She and three other females were accepted to Cornell Law School in 1896 with their 123 male classmates. Two years later, in 1898, she graduated from Cornell Law School with an LL.B. Gail Laughlin passed the New York bar exam in 1899 and opened her first law office in 1900.

== Career ==
Laughlin was the first woman from Maine to practice law. Her office in New York did not thrive with the challenges she had hoped to face. She was offered and accepted a job by Colonel Albert Clark, the man responsible for publishing her speech in the American Economist, to inspect the working conditions of domestic servants with the United States Industrial Commission. It was her job to inspect, observe, and report on the working conditions of those employed in domestic service in an attempt to improve the working conditions of employees. After two years of research she published a twenty-eight-page report for the United States Industrial Commission outlining the injustices that women of multiple demographics faced in domestic service. Laughlin learned that women were being paid less than men for equal work and faced many unreasonable demands.

Her work with the Industrial Commission inspired her to devote some of her life the Women's suffrage movement. She spent the next four years of her life (1902–1906) campaigning for the National American Woman Suffrage Association. Laughlin traveled the west promoting the vote and equal rights for women. In California, Laughlin worked as a suffrage organizer working alongside Mary Simpson Sperry who was the president of the California Women's Suffrage Association. Sperry's daughter, Dr. Mary Austin Sperry, became Laughlin's romantic partner. In 1907, Laughlin and Sperry moved to Denver, Colorado, where Laughlin opened her second law office. She served on eleven city and state boards in Denver. Laughlin and Sperry moved back to California in 1914.

Laughlin opened her third law office in 1914 in San Francisco, California. There she served on the Republican state central committee, became a member of the National Woman's Party, was a judge in the police courts, was one of the founders of the National League for Women's Service, and drafted and passed a law allowing women to be on juries in California.

In 1919, Laughlin traveled to St. Louis, Missouri, to attend the first convention of the National Federation of Business and Professional Women's Clubs of which she was a co-founder. The purpose of this meeting was to unite women and focus on the inequalities women face in the workforce. At the convention Laughlin gave the opening speech. She was a unifying symbol for the suffrage movement. She was elected as the president of National Federation of Business and Professional Women's Clubs at the end of the convention.

Laughlin grew homesick for her native New England. She returned to Portland, Maine, in 1924. She began practicing law with her brother Frederick.

In 1927, Laughlin was working to pass the Equal Rights Amendment. The bill was downed, but not out and she needed to draw some major attention to it. She and 200 others traveled to the Rapid City, South Dakota, to corner President Coolidge and get a massive amount of media attention. The goal was to get the bill into the next session, but President Coolidge announced he wouldn't be running for a second term and did not provide any support.

Laughlin wanted to have more of an impact on Maine and the impact landed on her desk. The Women's Literacy Union drafted a petition with 1,000 signatures on it for Laughlin to run for the Maine Legislature. In 1929, she was elected to the Maine Legislature and served three terms During her time with the Maine Legislature, she submitted many bills and passed a few laws all surrounding the well-being of women. She worked successfully to raise the minimum marriage age of girls from thirteen to sixteen and passed an act preventing the wrongful commitment of women into mental institutions. She continued to work on increasing wages for women, decreasing the demanding hours women worked, allowing to women to work at night and after marriage, and for women to be included on juries. Laughlin moved up to the state senate in 1935 and served until 1941. After the Senate, Laughlin became the first women recorder of court decisions, where she worked until 1945.

== Later life ==
Laughlin continued to work as a lawyer until 1948, when she suffered a minor stroke at 78. In 1952, she suffered a second stroke and died at the age of 83. She was posthumously inducted into the Maine Women's Hall of Fame in 1991.

== Personal life ==
Dr. Mary Austin Sperry and Laughlin were life partners from 1903 until 1919 when Dr. Sperry died. Sperry requested in her will that Laughlin serve as her executor and care for her remains, resulting in a contentious probate challenge by the Sperry family. Sperry's ashes are buried with Laughlin in Maine.
