= Bessie Beatty =

American journalist (1886–1947)

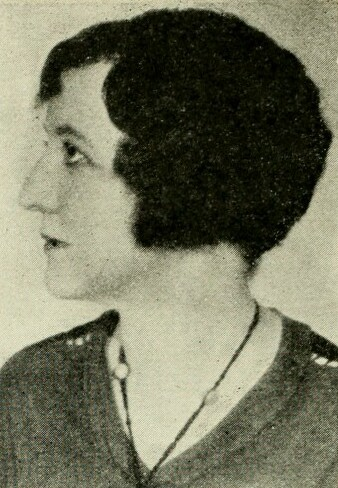
- Bessie Beatty in The Film Year Book of 1927
- Born: Elizabeth Mary Beatty; January 27 1886
- Died: April 6 1947 (aged 61)
- Education: Occidental College
- Occupations: Journalist; editor; playwright; radio host

Elizabeth Mary "Bessie" Beatty (January 27, 1886 – April 6, 1947) was an American journalist, editor, playwright, and radio host.

== Early life and education ==
Elizabeth Mary "Bessie" Beatty was born and raised in Los Angeles, one of four children of Thomas and Jane Boxwell Beatty, both immigrants from Ireland. As a child in Long Beach, she staged a children's show to raise money for the Red Cross, casting her siblings in some of the roles. She attended Occidental College, but did not graduate.

== Career ==
Her first job in journalism was with the Los Angeles Herald, while she was still in college. She had a regular column at the San Francisco Bulletin from 1907 to 1917, called "On the Margin." While on assignment covering a miners' strike in Nevada, she wrote and published Who's Who in Nevada, a biographical dictionary. Beatty accompanied fellow journalists Rheta Childe Dorr, Albert Rhys Williams, Louise Bryant and John Reed on a trip to Russia in 1917. There she interviewed Leon Trotsky, and members of the Women's Battalion, whose courage and strength impressed her. Her book about that trip, The Red Heart of Russia, was published in 1918. "I had been alive at a great moment, and knew it was great," she wrote of her time in Russia.

Beatty worked as a freelance journalist for much of her career. She was editor of McCall's Magazine from 1918 to 1921. She was American Secretary of the International P. E. N. Club. In 1932 a play she co-wrote with novelist Jack Black, Jamboree, was produced briefly on Broadway. From 1940 until her death, she hosted a popular radio show in New York City; her on-air persona was once referred to as "Mrs. Know-it-all" in Time magazine. During World War II she used her show to sell over $300,000 in war bonds, and was recognized by the Women's International Exposition of Arts and Industries with their annual radio award in 1943.

As an activist, she was a member of the feminist group Heterodoxy. She wrote "A Political Primer for the New Voter" (1912), a pamphlet designed for California women newly exercising the right of suffrage. In 1919 she gave testimony at a Senate hearing on "Bolshevik Propaganda."

== Personal life ==
Beatty married actor William Sauter in 1926. The lived in Los Angeles, and later in New York City. Their wire-haired terriers, Biddy and Terry, were frequently mentioned on Miss Beatty's radio program, and even received fan mail. Beatty died suddenly by heart attack in April 1947, age 61. There was a tribute program aired the day after her death.
