= Sadie Hurst =

American politician

Sadie D. Hurst
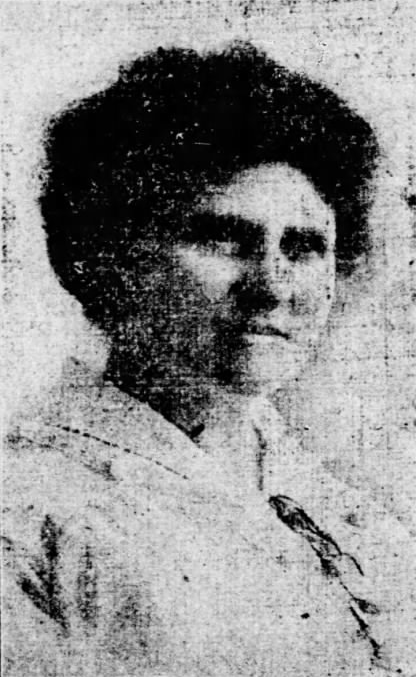

Member of the Nevada Assembly
- In office January 1919 – 1920

Personal details
- Born: Sadie Dotson; July 27, 1857 Iowa, U.S.
- Died: January 17, 1952 (aged 94) Pasadena, California, U.S.
- Spouse: Horton Hurst
- Children: 2

Sadie Dotson Hurst (July 27, 1857 – January 17, 1952) was an American politician who served as a member of the Nevada Assembly, the first woman elected to the Nevada Legislature.

== Early life ==
Sadie Dotson was born in Iowa in 1857. Horton and her family relocated to Reno, Nevada in the early-1900s.

== Career ==
Endorsed by the Nevada State Journal, she was the first woman elected to the Nevada Legislature (R-Washoe). When the legislature met in special session on February 7, 1919 to ratify the Federal Suffrage Amendment, it was Hurst who presented the resolution. She had a further distinction of being the first woman to preside over a state Legislature during the ratification of the Federal Suffrage Amendment. At the time, she was not only Nevada's first assemblywoman but also its only one, having been picked by the Women Citizens' Club of Reno, to bring women into the legislature. She also was the member of the Nevada Legislature who presented the bill to raise the age of consent for girls from 16 to 18, a bill which passed both houses and was signed by the Governor.

Hurst lost her 1920 bid for re-election, and eventually moved to California with her sons, where they established a manufacturing plant in Escondido.

== Personal life ==
While still in Iowa, Hurst had two children with her husband, Horton Hurst. Hurst died in Pasadena, California in 1952.

== See also ==
- Jeannette Rankin
