= Jeanne Wier =

Jeanne Elizabeth Wier
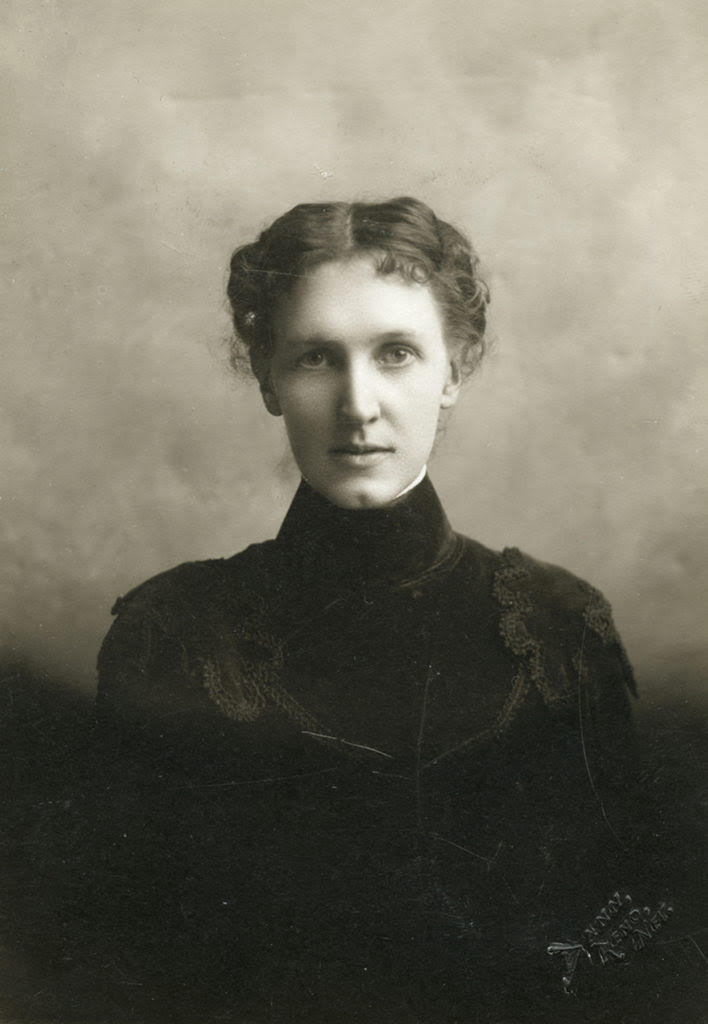
- Born: April 8, 1870; Grinnell, Iowa, U.S.
- Died: April , 1950; Reno, Nevada, U.S.
- Known for: Historian

Jeanne Elizabeth Wier (April 8, 1870 – April 1950) was a teacher, historian, and founder of the Nevada Historical Society.

== Early life ==
Jeanne Wier was born in Grinnell, Iowa on April 8, 1870 to parents Adolphus William Wier and Elizabeth Greenside Rood Wier. She graduated as class valedictorian from Clear Lake High School, in Clear Lake, Iowa in 1886. She entered the didactics program at the Iowa State Normal School in Cedar Falls, and graduated with a bachelor's degree in 1893. In the 1890s, Wier’s family left Iowa and moved to Heppner, Oregon, where she was an assistant principal of the high school from 1893 to 1895. In that year Wier began her studies at Stanford University, where she majored in history, studying under Professor George Elliott Howard. In 1897 she began field work for her thesis in northern Nevada studying the Washoe Indians.

== Nevada State University ==
In 1899, Anne Henrietta Martin, who had been teaching in the history department of Nevada State University, requested a leave of absence from the board of regents. In her request she requested Jeanne Wier to serve as her replacement. Wier, still a few credits short of graduation, arrived in Nevada in September, 1899 where she was appointed acting assistant professor of history in charge of the Department of History. The timing of Wier’s arrival was marked by a period of growth and expansion for the university, under the leadership of President Joseph Edward Stubbs. When Martin returned from her leave of absence in 1901, Wier was offered a permanent position in the history department, while Martin taught only a small selection of classes. In September 1901, Wier also completed her thesis and received her master's degree from Stanford. In November, the board of regents approved her appointment as assistant professor of history in charge of the Department of History and Political Science with an annual salary of $1200. Wier remained the only faculty member in the department until 1913. While teaching in the history department, Wier supervised Effie Mona Mack's Masters thesis in history. During her early tenure at the university, Wier became move active in the Reno community. She gave lectures to the 20th Century Club, although there was no indication that she was a member. Wier received an honorary doctorate in 1924 from the university, in recognition of her twenty-five years of service to the University of Nevada.

== Nevada Historical Society ==
At the May 31, 1904 meeting of the Social Science section of the Nevada Academy of Sciences, the Nevada Historical Society was officially founded. Newspaper publisher Robert Fulton was elected president of the society, and Wier was elected executive secretary. Other committee members were university faculty and included Professors James E. Church, G.H. True, and President Stubbs. Wier would hold the title of executive secretary, or “secretary and curator” from that meeting until her death in 1950. Although the leadership of the historical society was largely made up of University faculty, and was closely associated with it, it was never classed as an affiliated organization. The first activity of the society was to solicit support and membership across the state. Wier wrote to prominent individuals and early pioneer families, soliciting their support in the historical society. From 1904 until 1907, when the historical society became a state agency, Wier sought individual memberships as the primary means of financial support for the new society. Even after becoming officially supported by the state of Nevada, the society had no permanent home until 1911, when the state appropriated $5000 towards the construction of a building, completed in 1913. Prior to this, Wier stored all of the society’s materials in her own home. In addition to letters of solicitation, Wier went out on collecting trips across the state to procure “early newspapers, manuscripts, photographs, maps, books, Indian materials, and artifacts from earlier settlement and mining periods.” An early important collection Wier managed to acquire in a 1908 trip were the papers of William Morris Stewart, one of Nevada's first senators. In her first biennial report of the historical society in 1908, Weir explained the importance of such trips. “No permanent success can be achieved by this organization until there is at least one person in each community who has a sympathetic knowledge of the work which we plan to do. Correspondence has failed to accomplish this end. But many a person who had been irresponsive to letters became interested and even enthusiastic when visited in person.” In the 1920s the societies first building was already inadequate for the storage and access of its historical collections. Wier asked the legislature for additional appropriations without success. In 1933, Wier received assistance from the Works Progress Administration to have needed repairs done to the building. Following World War 2, the legislature increased its funding for the historical society. But it would not be until after Wier’s death in 1950, that the Nevada Historical Society received a new building in 1960.

== Works ==
- Nevada State Historical Society. First bulletin, by Jeanne Elizabeth Wier, secretary 1908
- The work of the Western state historical society as illustrated by Nevada. Paper read at the annual meeting of the Pacific Coast Branch of the American Historical Association, University of California, November 19, 1910
- Nevada State Historical Society. The celebration of Nevada's semicentennial of statehood [program of event held in Reno, Oct. 29 – Nov. 1, 1914] Program prepared for publication by Jeanne Elizabeth Wier
- “Experiences of a western state historical society during the last quarter century” Reprint from the Proceedings of the Pacific Coast Branch of the American Historical Association, 1927

== Sources ==
- Chung, Su Kim. (2015). "We Seek to Be Patient": Jeanne Wier and the Nevada Historical Society, 1904–1950. UCLA: Information Studies 045A. Retrieved from: http://escholarship.org/uc/item/51d75576
- Chung, Su Kim. “‘Flies Millions Thick’: A Diary of Jeanne Wier’s Collecting Trip to Southern Nevada, July–August 1908.” Nevada Historical Society Quarterly. 26, nos. 3-4. (Fall/Winter 2013).
- Doten, Samuel B. (1924) An illustrated history of the University of Nevada Carson City : The University of Nevada; printed at the State Printing Office
- Earl. Phillip I. 1985. “Nevada Historical Society” Encyclopedia of Library and Information Science Volume 39 Supplement 4
- Hulse, James W. (1974) The University of Nevada: a centennial history. Reno : University of Nevada Press.
