= Anne Henrietta Martin =

American writer, suffragist, and pacifist (1875–1951)

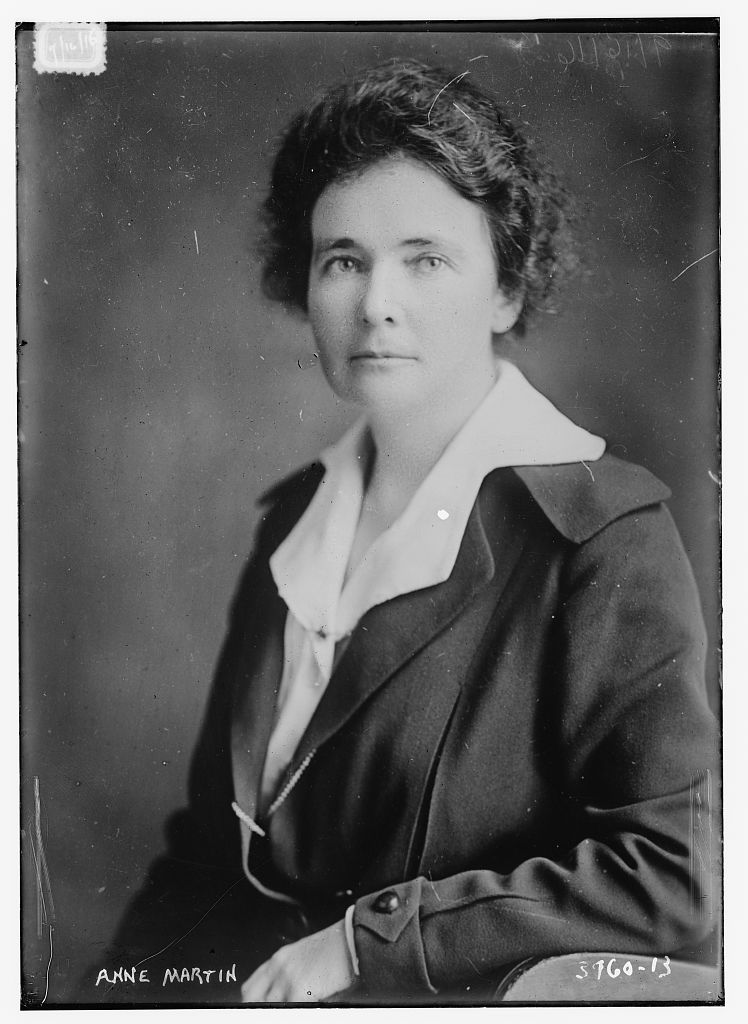
- Martin in 1916
- Born: September 30, 1875; Empire City, Nevada, US
- Died: April 15, 1951 (aged 75); Carmel, California, US
- Other name: Little Governor Anne
- Education: Bishop Whitaker's School for Girls: University of Nevada (BA); Stanford University (BA, MA)
- Occupations: Suffragist, pacifist, author
- Parent(s): William O'Hara Martin and Louise Stadtmuller Martin
- Writing career
- Pen name: Anne O'Hara

Anne Henrietta Martin (September 30, 1875 – April 15, 1951) (pseudonym, Anne O'Hara; nickname, Little Governor Anne) was an American suffragist, pacifist, and author from the state of Nevada. Her main achievement was taking charge of the state legislation that gave women of Nevada the right to vote. She was the first head of the department of history of the University of Nevada (1897–1901) and was active in the suffrage movement in England in 1909–1911, working with Emmeline Pankhurst. She was president of the Nevada equal franchise society in 1912, and the first national chairman of the National Woman's Party in 1916. She was the first woman to run for the United States Senate; She lost twice, in 1918 and 1920.

== Early years ==
Martin was the daughter of William O'Hara Martin, of Irish descent, who served as a Nevada State Senator, and her mother, Louise Stadtmuller Martin, was Bavarian. She attended Bishop Whitaker's School for Girls in Reno. Anne attended the University of Nevada (1891–1894), where she earned a degree in history. She earned a second B.A. in 1896 and an M.A. in history in 1897 from Stanford University.

== Career ==
In 1897, Martin established the University of Nevada's department of history. After two years in the department, she left to study at Columbia University, Chase's Art School, University of London, and University of Leipzig; but returned to the department in 1901–1903. During her leave from the university, Martin recommended the Board of Regents replace her with Jeanne Wier, a friend of hers from Stanford who was just finishing her degree.

Martin returned from Europe in 1901 to attend her father's funeral. Her father's death gave her a revelation, "suddenly made a feminist of me! . . . I found that I stood alone in my family against a man-controlled world." Martin traveled in Europe and Asia and experienced the women's revolution in England between 1909 and 1911, she became a Fabian Socialist, and wrote short stories and political articles, occasionally under the pen name of Anne O'Hara. Martin was arrested in 1910 over an issue of trying to enfranchise British women. Her friend from Stanford, Lou Henry Hoover, sent her husband Herbert Hoover to pay Martin's bail, but Frederick Pethick-Lawrence had already taken care of that.

After returning to Nevada in the fall of 1911, she became president of the Nevada Equal Franchise Society in February 1912 and organized a campaign over sparsely populated deserts that convinced male voters to enfranchise women on November 3, 1914. This success led to her representation of the national movement as a speaker and executive committee member of the National American Woman Suffrage Association and the Congressional Union. Martin helped organize voting women in the West in 1916 to challenge Democrats. She was one of the Silent Sentinels, National Woman's Party women who picketed for suffrage in front of the White House on July 14, 1917; as a result, she was sentenced to Occoquan Workhouse, but was pardoned less than a week later by President Woodrow Wilson.

In 1918, representing Nevada, Martin was the first American woman to run for the US Senate. Martin's campaigns focused on illuminating how women could act as a positive influence in the political world. Her platforms focused on providing better working conditions for men and women and nationalization of railroads and public utilities alienated women suffragists. Between her 1918 and 1920 campaigns, Martin wrote a series of articles and essays and in these essays Martin urges women to form autonomous political organizations.

Martin moved to Carmel, California, in 1921, and recuperated from a heart attack in 1930. In 1945, she received an honorary Doctorate of Laws from the University of Nevada. She also wrote two articles for the Encyclopædia Britannica, one on Josephine Butler in the 1944 edition, and one on white slavery for the 1948 edition.

== Death ==
Anne Henrietta Martin died in Carmel, California, in 1951.

== See also ==
- List of suffragists and suffragettes
- Timeline of women's suffrage
- Women's suffrage organizations
